= Temple of Jupiter Invictus =

Temple in ancient Rome

The Temple of Jupiter Invictus (Latin: Aedes Iovis Invicti, lit. 'Temple of Jupiter the Unconquered'), sometimes known as the Temple of Jupiter Victor (Latin: Aedes Iovis Victoris, lit. 'Temple of Jupiter the Conqueror'), was a temple on the Palatine Hill of ancient Rome.

The date of the temple's construction is uncertain, but it came to eclipse an earlier temple of Jupiter Victor on the Quirinal Hill, with which it is sometimes confused. It was credited as the sight of several divine portents during the imperial period, and may have been the shrine briefly dedicated to the Syrian god Elagabal by the emperor Elagabalus in the third century CE. Since the 1950s, the temple has been considered completely lost.

== History ==
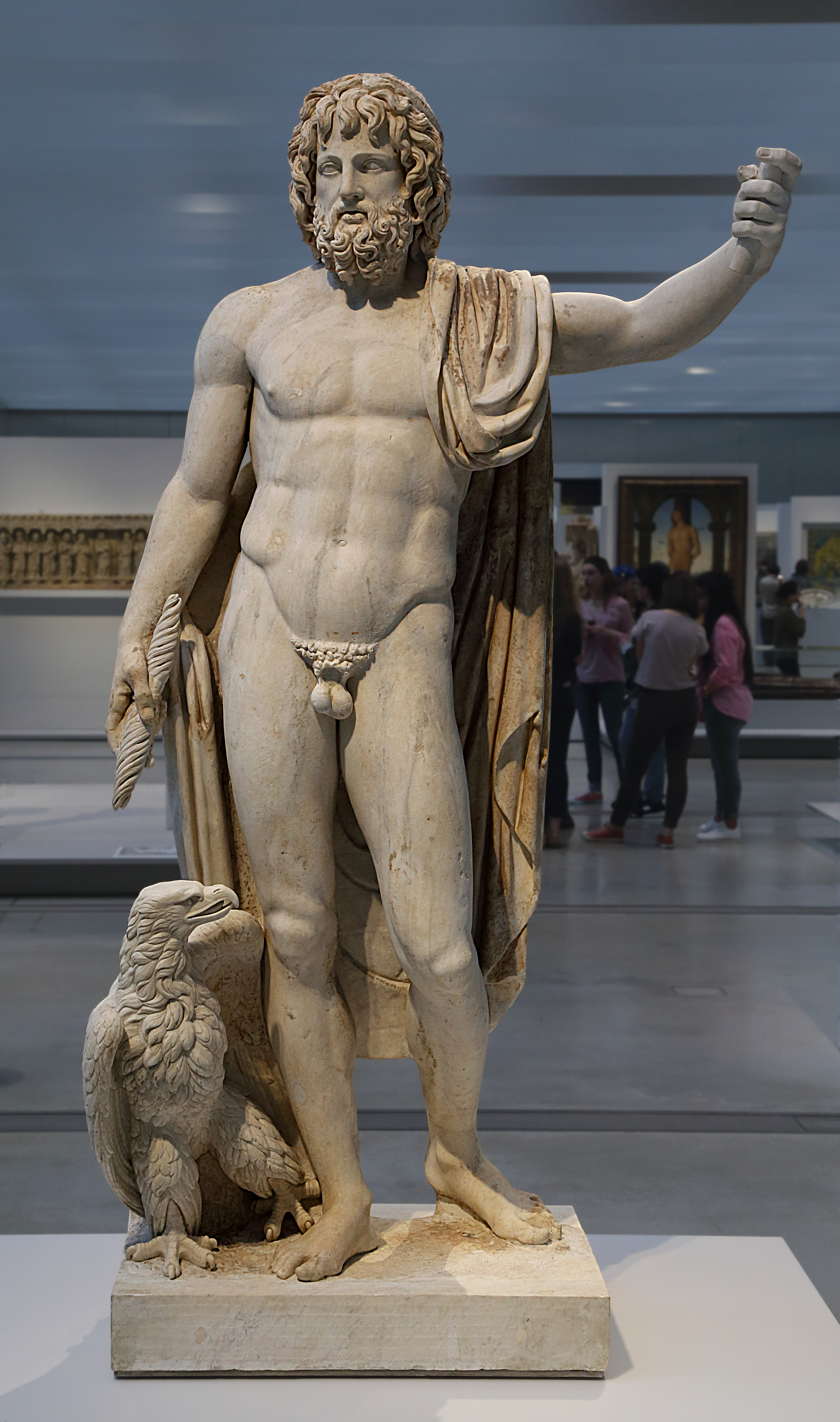
Marble statue of Jupiter, with his characteristic attributes of thunderbolt and eagle, made around 150 CE

The temple was dedicated to Jupiter, the king of the Roman gods. According to the Roman poet Ovid, writing between 1 and 8 CE, the temple was dedicated on the Ides of June (that is, 13 June). (Note: Coarelli 1997, p. 143, citing Fasti 6.650.) The temple's construction is not mentioned in the comprehensive history of Rome written by the historian Livy at the end of the first century BCE, leading the Italian archaeologist Filippo Coarelli to suggested that its construction took place either between 292 and 218 BCE or after 167 BCE, as these periods are not covered by the surviving books of Livy's narrative.

An older temple to Jupiter was vowed by the Roman commander and consul Quintus Fabius Maximus Rullianus during the Battle of Sentinum in 295 BCE, and was built on the Quirinal Hill over the next few years. This temple was dedicated on the Ides of April. (Note: Platner & Ashby 1929, p. 306, citing Fasti 4.621. For the date of the Fasti, see Newlands 1995, p. 3.) By the imperial period (that is, by 27 BCE), the epithets Victor and Invictus both referred to the temple on the Palatine, originally known as Invictus, and any distinction with the Quirinal cult of Jupiter Victor was lost. The two temples are still sometimes confused in modern sources.

It has been assumed that this was the temple that was redesigned during the reign of Domitian (r. 81–96 CE) as part of his massive rebuilding works on the Palatine, and which sat at the entrance of the imperial residence known as the Domus Augustana beside a monumental arch. It is further thought that this was the temple (the Elagabalium) that the emperor Elagabalus (r. 218–222 CE) rededicated to his patron deity, the Syrian sun-god Elagabal, which Elagabalus's successor Severus Alexander restored to the worship of Jupiter.

The third-century Roman historian Cassius Dio recorded that the temple had been struck by lightning, a phenomenon generally regarded in ancient Rome as a divine portent sent by Jupiter, in 42 BCE. The consuls summoned the senate to meet in the temple following the assassination of the emperor Caligula in 41 CE. According to Dio, the temple's doors opened spontaneously before the assassination of Caligula's successor, Claudius, in 54 CE, which was retrospectively taken as an omen of his death. (Note: Platner & Ashby 1929, pp. 306–307. Dio mentions the lightning strike at 47.40.2 and the omen of the opening doors at 60.35.)

A passage of the late antique Notitia Dignitatum has been interpreted as giving tentative evidence for the temple's survival into the third century CE. Until the 1950s, the ruins currently identified as those of the Temple of Apollo Palatinus were commonly believed to have been the remains of this temple. However, further excavation of the Temple of Apollo Palatinus disproved this connection, and it is currently considered that no secure identification between the temple and any known ruins can be made.

== Bibliography ==
- Claridge, Amanda (2010) [1998]. Rome. Oxford Archaeological Guides. Oxford: Oxford University Press. ISBN 978-0-19-954683-1.
- Coarelli, Filippo (1997). "Iuppiter Invictus". In Steinby, Eva Margareta (ed.). Lexicon Topographicum Urbis Romae (in Italian). Vol. 3. Rome: Edizioni Quazar. p. 143. ISBN 978-88-7140-096-9.
- Coarelli, Filippo (2014). Rome and Environs: An Archaeological Guide. Translated by Clauss, James J.; Harmon, Daniel P. Berkeley: University of California Press. ISBN 978-0-520-28209-4.
- Hill, Philip V. (1962). "The Temples and Statues of Apollo in Rome". The Numismatic Chronicle and Journal of the Royal Numismatic Society. 2: 125–142. JSTOR 42662641.
- Newlands, Carole E. (1995). Playing with Time: Ovid and the Fasti. New York: Cornell University Press. ISBN 978-0-8014-3080-0.
- Platner, Samuel Ball; Ashby, Thomas (1929). A Topographical Dictionary of Ancient Rome. London: Oxford University Press. ISBN 978-0-19-925649-5.
