= De astronomia =

Ancient Roman mythology collection and astronomical treatise

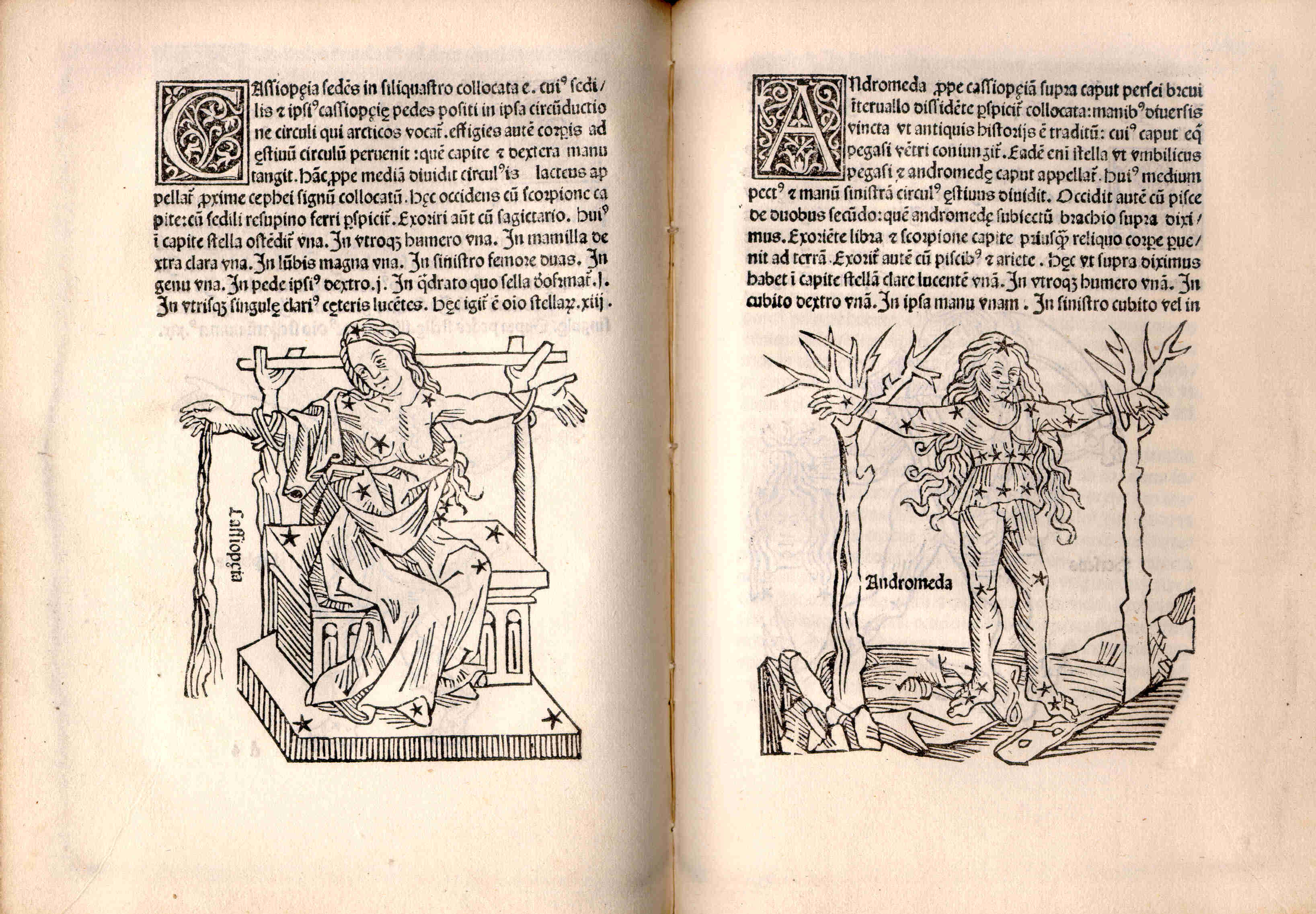
Two pages from the Ratdolt edition of the De astronomia showing woodcuts of the constellations Cassiopeia and Andromeda. Courtesy of the US Naval Observatory Library

De astronomia (Latin: [deː äs̠t̪rɔˈnɔmiä]; Concerning Astronomy) (Note: Also known as the Poeticon Astronomicon, the Astronomica, and the Poetica astronomica.) is a book of stories written in Latin, probably during the reign of Augustus (c. 27 BC – AD 14). Attributed to "Hyginus", the text describes 47 of the 48 Ptolemaic constellations, centering primarily on the Greek and Roman mythology surrounding the constellations, though there is some discussion of the relative positions of stars.

== Authorship and contents ==
The book's true author has been long debated. Many scholars, such as the art historian Kristen Lippincott and the Latinist Ghislaine Viré, argue that the author was likely Gaius Julius Hyginus, who served as the superintendent of the Palatine library under Caesar Augustus. Conversely, the editors of the Encyclopædia Britannica Eleventh Edition (1910–11) argued that the work's rough style suggested that its author was unlikely to be someone "so distinguished" as C. Julius Hyginus.

The text describes 47 of the 48 Ptolemaic constellations, centering primarily on the Greek and Roman mythology surrounding the constellations, though there is some discussion of the relative positions of stars. The stories it contains are chiefly based on Catasterismi, a lost work traditionally attributed to Eratosthenes of Cyrene.

The Astronomia is a collection of abridgements. The star lists in the Astronomia are in exactly the same order as in Ptolemy's Almagest, reinforcing the idea of a 2nd-century compilation.

== Textual history ==
The editio princeps of De astronomia was published in 1475 by Augustinus Carnerius. Less than a decade later, in 1482, Erhard Ratdolt published an edition of De astronomia, which carried the full title Clarissimi Viri Hyginii Poeticon Astronomicon Opus Utilissimum. For this print, Ratdolt commissioned a series of woodcuts depicting the constellations to accompany Hyginus's text. As with many other star atlases that would follow it, the positions of various stars are indicated overlaid on the image of each constellation. However, the relative positions of the stars in the woodcuts bear little resemblance to the descriptions given by Hyginus in the text or the actual positions of the stars in the sky.

== Scholarly impact ==
As a result of the inaccuracy of the depicted star positions and the fact that the constellations are not shown with any context, the De astronomia is not particularly useful as a guide to the night sky. However, the illustrations commissioned by Ratdolt served as a template for future sky atlas renderings of the constellation figures. The text, by contrast, is an important source, and occasionally the only source, for some of the more obscure Greek myths.
