= Amanda Claridge =

Emerita professor of Roman archaeology (1949–2022)

Amanda Claridge FSA
- Born: 1 September 1949; RAF Halton, Buckinghamshire, England
- Died: 5 May 2022 (aged 72); London, England

Academic background
- Education: Institute of Archaeology

Academic work
- Discipline: Classical archaeology
- Sub-discipline: Roman archaeology; Roman sculpture; Roman architecture; city of Rome; Antiquarianism
- Institutions: Princeton University; British School at Rome; Institute of Archaeology, University of Oxford; St John's College, Oxford; Royal Holloway, University of London

Amanda Jacqueline Claridge FSA (1 September 1949 – 5 May 2022) was a British archaeologist and academic. She was Professor of Roman Archaeology at Royal Holloway, University of London. Her research interests included "Roman archaeology, especially art, marble sculpture and the marble trade; Roman architecture and urbanism; topography and monuments of the city of Rome and Latium; Antiquarian studies in 16th and 17th century Rome."

== Personal life ==
Claridge was born at RAF Hospital Halton; her father, John Claridge, a New Zealander from Wellington, was awarded the DFC as a flight lieutenant bomber pilot, and subsequently rose to wing commander in the RAF. Her Scottish mother, Marie (née Cooper), was a flight officer working in intelligence at RAF Bottesford, Leicestershire.

Claridge's parents separated, her father returning to his native New Zealand while her mother relocated to Italy. As a student Claridge's mother had volunteered on excavations under the direction of Mortimer Wheeler, and this no doubt influenced Claridge to take an undergraduate degree at the Institute of Archaeology in London (now part of UCL), where she was taught by Donald Strong, an authority in Roman art and architectural studies.

After graduating she went to the British School at Rome as a scholar in classical studies (1973–75).

A resident of London, she died there from cancer on 5 May 2022, aged 72.

== Career ==
In 1976 she assisted John Bryan Ward-Perkins, who had recently retired as Director of the British School in Rome, with the curation and catalogue of the Royal Academy's 'Pompeii AD79' exhibition. She moved to Princeton University in the late 1970s as assistant professor of classical archaeology.

Claridge was the Assistant Director of the British School at Rome from 1980 to 1994.

Claridge left Rome for the University of Oxford where she was a research associate at the Institute of Archaeology and a lecturer at St John's College, Oxford. In 2000 she moved to Royal Holloway, University of London as reader in Roman archaeology.

She undertook fieldwork in Rome, elsewhere in Italy, Turkey, and North Africa. Claridge was a research fellow at the British School at Rome, 2018-19.

== Awards and honours ==
Claridge was elected as a Fellow of the Society of Antiquaries in 1986. She was a member of the Member Accademia Pontiicia Romana di Arch. Claridge was awarded the Commendatore Italian Order of Merit. Claridge was on the Advisory Committee of the Journal of Roman Archaeology. In 2010 she was elected as a Corresponding Member of the Archaeological Institute of America.

Her archaeological guide to ancient Rome has been described as "a staple reference on the ancient city for English speaking students and tourists".

== Selected publications ==
- Claridge, Amanda; Herkoltz, I. (2012). Classical Manuscript Illustrations. The Paper Museum of Cassiano dal Pozzo. Series A, Antiquities and Architecture. Vol. 6. London: The Royal Collection in association with Harvey Miller Publishers.
- Holleran, C.; Claridge, Amanda, eds. (2018). Companion to the City of Rome. Oxford: Wiley-Blackwell.
- Claridge, Amanda (1993). "Hadrian's Column of Trajan". Journal of Roman Archaeology. 6: 5–22. doi:10.1017/S1047759400011442. S2CID 163039877.
- — (2007). "Hadrian's Lost Temple of Trajan". Journal of Roman Archaeology. 20: 54–94. doi:10.1017/S1047759400005316. S2CID 190685069.
- Rome: An Oxford Archaeological Guide. Oxford Archaeological Guides (2nd ed.). Oxford: Oxford University Press. 2010 [2008]. ISBN 978-0-19-954683-1.
- — (2013). "Hadrian's Succession and the Monuments of Trajan". In Opper, T. (ed.). Hadrian: Arts, Politics and Economy. British Museum Research Publications. Vol. 175. London: British Museum Press. pp. 5–18.
