= Pietro Rosa =

Italian archaeologist (1810–1891)

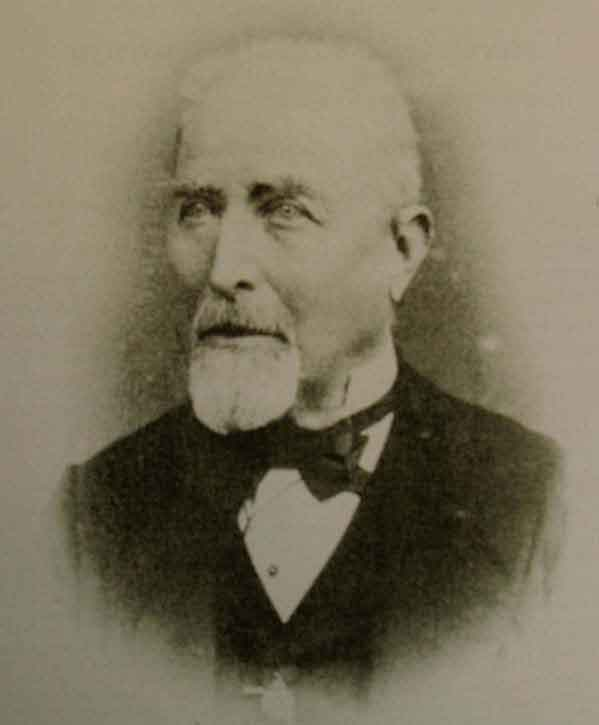
Pietro Rosa

Pietro Rosa (November 10, 1810 in Rome – August 15, 1891 in Rome) was an Italian architect and topographer. He studied the settlements of the ancient Roman countryside and carried out a systematic series of excavations on the Palatine Hill in Rome.

One of Rosa's ancestors was Salvator Rosa (1615–1673); Pietro was an avid patriot for the defense of the city of Rome in 1849 during the Roman Republic.

A student of Luigi Canina, Rosa was an avid scholar of Rome and Latium. From 1861 until 1870 he carried out his excavations on the Palatine with the patronage of the French emperor Napoleon III. In 1865, Rosa excavated the concrete core of the podium of the Temple of Apollo Palatinus. He also edited the Carta topografica del Lazio, an archaeological plan that he designed between 1850 and 1870 on a scale of 1:20,000. The map, measuring 3.40 x 3.10m, charts the territory of Latium (modern Lazio) and the archaeological remains there. The work was completed only in certain areas, such as the Tyrrhenian coast, Tibur and Palestrina.

Rosa was named archaeological superintendent at Rome by royal decree on March 26, 1871. In the following years he was inspector general of antiquities in the ministry of public instruction and he was made a senator on December 1, 1870.

== Sources ==
- Wiseman, T. P. (2022). "Palace-Sanctuary or Pavilion? Augustus' House and the Limits of Archaeology". Papers of the British School at Rome. 90: 9–34. doi:10.1017/S0068246221000295. S2CID 246725531.
