= Gaius Julius Hyginus =

Roman freedman and writer (c. 64 BC – AD 17)

Gaius Julius Hyginus (/hɪˈdʒaɪnəs/; c. 64 BC – AD 17) was a Latin author, a pupil of the scholar Alexander Polyhistor, and a freedman of Augustus, and reputed author of the Fabulae and the De astronomia, although this is disputed.

== Life and works ==
Hyginus may have originated either from Spain, or from the Egyptian city of Alexandria. He was elected superintendent of the Palatine library by Augustus according to Suetonius's De Grammaticis, 20.

Suetonius remarks that Hyginus fell into great poverty in his old age and was supported by the historian Clodius Licinus. Hyginus was a voluminous author: his works included topographical and biographical treatises, commentaries on Helvius Cinna and the poems of Virgil, and disquisitions on agriculture and bee-keeping. All these are lost.

== Attributed works ==
Two Latin works which have survived under the name of Hyginus are a mythological handbook, known as the Genealogiae or the Fabulae, and an astronomical work, entitled De astronomia. Though there a handful of scholars who posit that Gaius Julius Hyginus was the Hyginus who authored these works, there is general agreement that they were composed by a separate author. In the earliest edition of the Fabulae, produced in 1535 by Jacob Micyllus, the work is ascribed to Gaius Julius Hyginus, though it is unclear whether this attribution was added by Micyllus himself, or was there prior to him.

== Legacy ==
The lunar crater Hyginus and the minor planet 12155 Hyginus are named after him.

The English author Sir Thomas Browne opens his discourse The Garden of Cyrus (1658) with a Creation myth sourced from the Fabulae of Hyginus.
