= Paul Zanker =

German classical archaeologist (born 1937)

- Born: 7 February 1937 (age 89)
- Occupation: Professor

Academic background
- Education: LMU Munich; Sapienza University of Rome; University of Freiburg

Academic work
- Institutions: Scuola Normale Superiore (2001–present); LMU Munich (1976–2002); University of Göttingen (1972–1976)
- Main interests: Hellenistic and Roman periods

Paul Zanker (born 7 February 1937) is the professor of Storia dell’Arte Antica at the Scuola Normale Superiore in Pisa. Previously Zanker was professor of classical archaeology at LMU Munich (1976–2002) and the University of Göttingen (1972–1976). He is a noted expert on Roman art and archaeology and a member of the Bavarian Academy of Sciences, corresponding Fellow of the British Academy, of the Academia Europaea, of the Royal Danish Academy of Sciences and Letters, the Pontifical Academy of Archaeology and of the German Archaeological Institute. From 1990 to 1991 he was the Sather professor of the University of California at Berkeley. Zanker is head of the German Commission for the Corpus Vasorum Antiquorum.

== Selected publications ==
Publications in German:

- Wandel der Hermesgestalt in der attischen Vasenmalerei. Habelt, Bonn 1965. [Freiburg i. Br., Univ., Diss., 1962]
- Forum Augustum. Das Bildprogramm. Wasmuth, Tübingen 1968
- Forum Romanum. Die Neugestaltung durch Augustus, Wasmuth, Tübingen 1968 ISBN 3-8030-1404-2
- Klassizistische Statuen. Studien zur Veränderung des Kunstgeschmacks in der römischen Kaiserzeit, von Zabern, Mainz 1974 [Freiburg i.Br., Univ., Habil.-Schr.]
- Studien zu den Augustus-Porträts, Band 1: Der Actium-Typus. Göttingen 1973. (Abhandlungen der Akademie der Wissenschaften zu Göttingen, Philologisch-Historische Klasse; Folge 3, 85) ISBN 3-525-82358-4
- Provinzielle Kaiserporträts. Zur Rezeption der Selbstdarstellung des Princeps. München 1983. (Abhandlungen / Bayerische Akademie der Wissenschaften, Philosophisch-historische Klasse N.F. 90)
- Augustus und die Macht der Bilder, C.H. Beck, München 1987 ISBN 3-406-32067-8 (auch: Leipzig, Koehler & Amelang 1987); 4. Auflage, 2003.
- Die Trunkene Alte. Das Lachen der Verhöhnten, Fischer, Frankfurt/Main 1988 ISBN 3-596-23960-5
- Pompeji. Stadtbild und Wohngeschmack, von Zabern, Mainz 1995 (Kulturgeschichte der Antiken Welt, Bd. 61) ISBN 3-8053-1685-2
- Hrsg., mit Michael Wörrle: Stadtbild und Bürgerbild im Hellenismus (Vestigia. Beiträge zur Alten Geschichte Band 47). C. H. Beck Verlag, München 1995, ISBN 3-406-39036-6
- Die Maske des Sokrates. Das Bild des Intellektuellen in der Antiken Kunst, C.H. Beck, München 1995 ISBN 3-406-39080-3
- Eine Kunst für die Sinne. Zur Bildwelt des Dionysos und der Aphrodite, Wagenbach, Berlin 1998 ISBN 3-8031-5162-7
- (mit Björn Christian Ewald): Mit Mythen leben. Die Bilderwelt der römischen Sarkophage, Hirmer, München 2004 ISBN 3-7774-9650-2
- Die Apotheose der römischen Kaiser. Ritual und städtische Bühne. München, Carl Friedrich von Siemens Stiftung 2004.

Publications in English:

- The power of images in the age of Augustus. Translated by Alan Shapiro. Ann Arbor: The University of Michigan Press (Jerome Lectures 16), 1988.
- Pompeii: Public and Private Life. Translated by Deborah Lucas Schneider. Cambridge: Harvard University Press, 1998.
