= Donald Emrys Strong =

British archaeologist

- Born: 1927; Pembrokeshire, Wales, England, UK
- Died: 1973 (aged 45–46); İznik, Turkey
- Education: Brasenose College
- Scientific career
- Fields: Archaeology

Donald Emrys Strong (1927–1973) was a British archaeologist, historian, and museum curator.

== Early life ==
He was born and brought up in Haverfordwest, Pembrokeshire.

He attended the Haverfordwest school and studied as an open scholar at Brasenose College, University of Oxford.

His Ph.D. was granted in 1954 writing his dissertation on Roman architectural ornament under J. M. C. Toynbee.

== Career ==
He worked at the Inspectorate of Ancient Monuments. Bernard Ashmole hired Strong at the Department of Greek and Roman Antiquities of the British Museum as Assistant Keeper.

He authored the museum's handbook on carved amber in 1966. Strong was appointed the first Professor of the Archaeology of the Roman Provinces at the Institute of Archaeology at the University of London in 1968.

== Recognition ==
- President of the British Archaeological Association in 1972–3
- Cofounder of the Society for Libyan Studies
- Cofounder of Archaeology Abroad Service.

== Bibliography ==
He authored several books.

- Origins of Western art: A General introduction
- Greek and Roman Gold and Silver Plates
- Roman crafts
- Archaeological theory and practice
- Origins of western art
- Archaeological theory and practice
- Roman museums : selected papers on Roman art and architecture

== See also ==
- Jocelyn Toynbee
- Bernard Ashmole
- Nikolaus Pevsner
