= Library of Palatine Apollo =

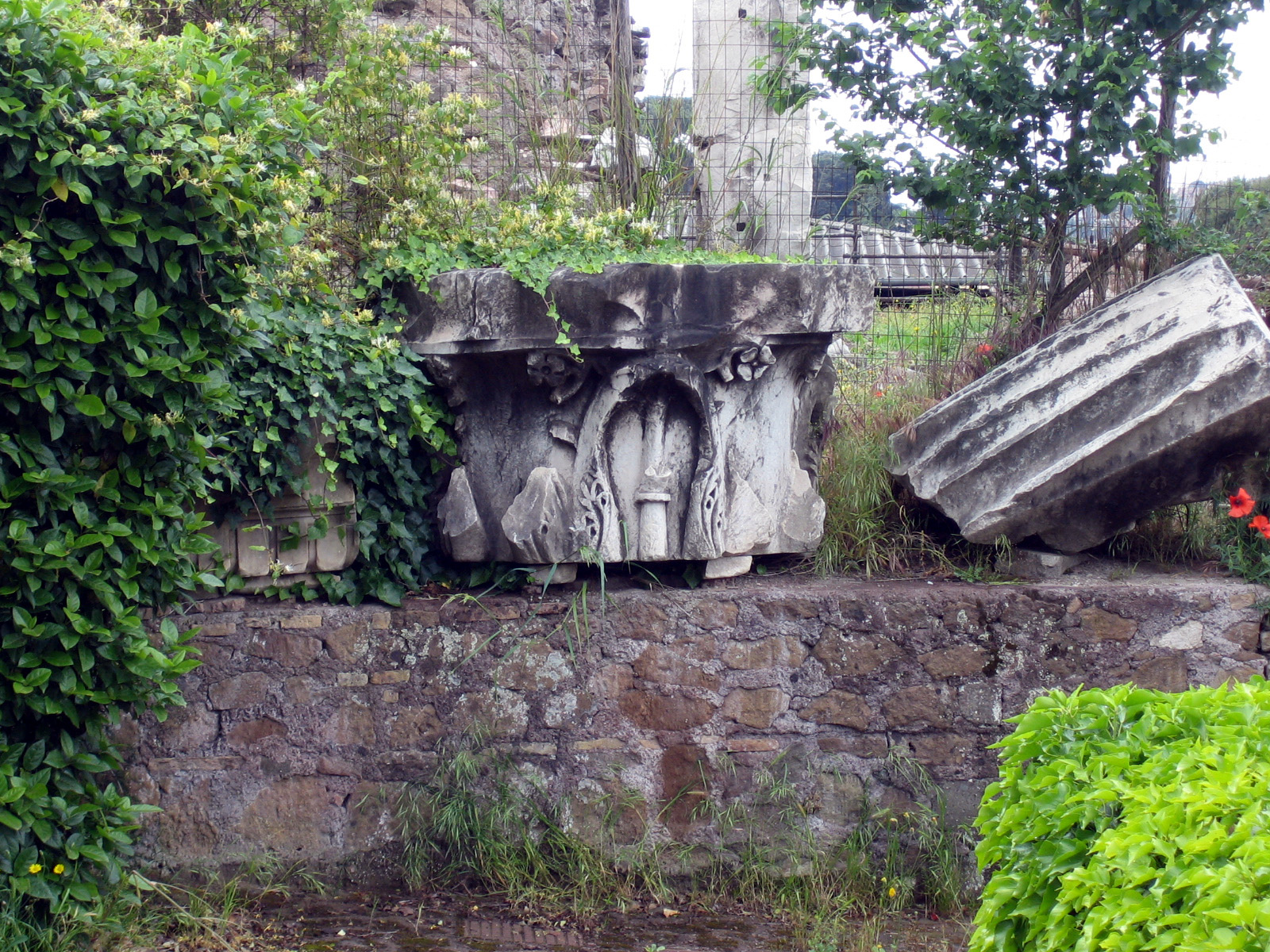
Remains of Temple Apollo Palatinus which housed the library

The Library of Palatine Apollo (Latin: Bibliotheca Apollinis Palatini) was a public library established by the Roman Emperor Augustus. It was located at the portico of the Temple of Apollo Palatinus and consisted of two halls, one for Greek and one for Latin books. The walls of the library included medallion portraits of famous writers, and the space was large enough for Augustus to hold meetings of the senate. When Augustus assumed the office of pontifex maximus, he moved the Sibylline Books from the Temple of Jupiter Capitolinus to the Palatine Apollo. Gaius Julius Hyginus, a freedman of Augustus and accomplished grammarian, was the director of the library.

Exclusion from the library definitively signaled an author’s rejection.
