= Arch of Octavius =

Coordinates: 41.8887°N 12.4855°E

The Arch of Octavius (Latin: Arcus Octavii) was a triumphal arch on the Palatine Hill in Rome. It formed part of the sanctuary of Apollo adjoining Augustus's residence. It formed one of the entrances to the Area Apollinis, on the south side, turned towards the Murcia valley. It was built at the same time as the rest of the sanctuary, around 28 BC.

According to Pliny the Elder, Augustus also built the arch in honour of his father Gaius Octavius. It was decorated with statues of Apollo and Artemis by the Greek sculptor Lysias. It supported an aedicule ornamented with columns and bearing a statue dedicated to Gaius Octavius. This configuration seems to be unique in Rome.

== See also ==
- List of Roman triumphal arches
- List of ancient monuments in Rome
- Octavia gens

== Bibliography ==
- Samuel Ball Platner and Thomas Ashby, A topographical dictionary of Ancient Rome, Oxford University Press, 1929
- Luc Duret and Jean-Paul Néraudeau, Urbanisme et métamorphose de la Rome antique, Les Belles Lettres, coll. "Realia", 2001
