= Pierre Gros =

Pierre Gros (born May 7, 1939 in Incheville, France) is a contemporary scholar of ancient Roman architecture and the Latin language, particularly the texts of the writer Vitruvius.

He presently holds the post of Professor of Latin language and civilization at the Université de Provence. He is the author of numerous scholarly treatises, including those on Roman architecture and urbanism, Roman architects, and important critical editions of Vitruvius published in the Collection Budé. In 2005 he was presented with a volume in his honor, Théorie et pratique de l'architecture romaine: la norme et l'expérimentation: études offertes á Pierre Gros, edited by Xavier Lafon et Gilles Sauron.

Among his best known works are his collaborative volume, with Mario Torelli, Storia dell'urbanistica: il mondo romano (Laterza, 1988) and his two-volume treatise on Roman architecture, L'architecture Romaine Du début du IIIème siècle avant J.-C. à la fin du Haut-Empire [vol. 1 Les monuments publics; vol. 2 2. maisons, palais, villas et tombeaux] (Picard, 1996–2001).
