= Susan Walker (archaeologist) =

Archaeologist, specialist in Roman art

Susan Walker FSA
- Born: 1948 (age 77–78)

Academic work
- Discipline: Archaeologist
- Sub-discipline: Ancient Rome; Roman art; Roman archaeology
- Institutions: British Museum; Ashmolean Museum; British School at Rome

Susan Walker FSA (born 1948) is an archaeologist specialising in the study of Roman art. She was previously the Keeper of Antiquities and is currently an Honorary Curator of the Ashmolean Museum, Oxford.

== Early life and education ==
As an undergraduate, Walker excavated at Gravina di Puglia and Melfi. Walker undertook doctoral work at the British School at Athens.

== Career ==
In 1977, she joined the British Museum. In the 1990s she was Senior Curator of Mediterranean Roman Antiquities. At the British Museum Walker curated a number of major exhibitions, including Ancient Faces: Mummy Portraits from Roman Egypt at the British Museum in 1997.

In 2004 she became the Sackler Keeper of Antiquities in the Ashmolean Museum, and she had a key role in the redevelopment of the museum's displays.

She has served as President of the Society for the Promotion of Libyan Studies. Walker was the Hugh Last Fellow and the Chair of Publications at the British School at Rome in 2013, undertaking a project on 'Gold-glass, inscriptions and sarcophagi from the catacombs of Rome'. She was the Balsdon Fellow 2006-7.

== Honours and awards ==
Walker was elected as a Fellow of the Society of Antiquaries in 1984.

== Selected publications ==
=== Books ===
- S. Walker and A. Burnett 1981. The Image of Augustus. London: British Museum Publications.
- S. Walker 1985. Memorials to the Roman Dead. London: British Museum.
- S. Walker 1990. Catalogue of Roman Sarcophagi in the British Museum.
- S. Walker 1991. Roman Art. London: British Museum.
- S. Walker 1995. Greek and Roman Portraits. London: British Museum.
- S. Walker and M. Bierbrier 1997. Ancient Faces: Mummy Portraits from Roman Egypt (A catalogue of Roman portraits in the British Museum). London: British Museum.
- S. Walker and P. Higgs 2002. Cleopatra of Egypt: From History to Myth. London: British Museum Press.
- S. Walker 2005. The Portland Vase. London: British Museum.
- S. Walker 2017. Saints and Salvation. Oxford: Ashmolean Museum.

=== Journal articles ===
- S. Walker 1979. A Sanctuary of Isis on the South Slope of the Athenian Acropolis. The Annual of the British School at Athens 74: 243-258.
- S. Walker 1991. Bearded Men. Journal of the History of Collections 3(2): 265–277, https://doi.org/10.1093/jhc/3.2.265
- S. Walker 2008. Cleopatra in Pompeii? Papers of the British School at Rome 76: 35–46, https://doi.org/10.1017/S0068246200000404
