= James J. Clauss =

American professor of Classics

James Joseph Clauss (born September 1, 1953, in Scranton, Pennsylvania) is an American classics professor.

== Biography ==
Clauss received a B.A. in 1974 from University of Scranton, a Master of Arts in 1976 from Fordham University, and a Ph. D. 1983 from University of California, Berkeley with a dissertation entitled Allusion and the Narrative Style of Apollonius Rhodius. He spent the academic year of 1982–1983 at the American School of Classical Studies at Athens.

He has been a professor at University of Washington since 1997 (associate professor 1990–1997, assistant professor 1984–1990). In addition, he has been adjunct professor in Near Eastern Languages and Literature since 2007, and in Comparative Literature since 2006.

Clauss's areas of study are Hellenistic literature (in particular Apollonius of Rhodes) and selected aspects of Roman literature.

== Selected publications ==
- The Gods of Greek Hexameter Poetry. From the Archaic Age to Late Antiquity and Beyond. Franz Steiner Verlag, Stuttgart 2016.
- A Companion to Hellenistic Literature. Blackwell, 2010; updated paperback edition 2014.
- Medea. Essays on Medea in Myth, Literature, Philosophy, and Art. Princeton University Press, Princeton 1997.
- The Best of the Argonauts. The Redefinition of the Epic Hero in Book 1 of Apollonius’s Argonautica. University of California Press, 1993.
- Rome and Environs: An Archaeological Guide. University of California Press, 2007; Updated Edition 2014.
