= Carole E. Newlands =

Scholar of Latin literature and culture

Carole Newlands
- Born: 1949 (age 76–77); Scotland

Academic background
- Education: PhD., 1984, University of California, Berkeley
- Thesis: The transformation of the Locus Amoenus in Roman poetry (1984)

Academic work
- Discipline: Classics
- Institutions: University of Colorado Boulder; Cornell University; University of California, Los Angeles; University of Wisconsin, Madison

Carole Elizabeth Newlands (born 1949) is a scholar of Latin literature and culture. She is a distinguished professor and associate chair of undergraduate studies at the University of Colorado Boulder.

== Career ==
Newlands joined the faculty of classics at the University of Colorado Boulder in 2009, after previously teaching at Cornell University, the University of California, Los Angeles, and University of Wisconsin, Madison. In the summer of 2010, she was selected as the Visiting NEH Professor of Classics at the University of Richmond. Her responsibilities included teaching Ovid's works to students in their classics department. She has also served on the editorial board of the American Journal of Philology and on the Board of Directors for the Society for Classical Studies from 2009 until 2012. In her last year on the board, Newlands edited "Statius Silvae Book II" through the Cambridge University Press which focused on Roman culture. She also published a book titled "Statius, Poet between Rome and Naples" which examined the poetry of Statius and the shifting attitudes to Hellenism, gender and Roman imperialism.

In 2019, Newlands was named a distinguished professor of classics at the University of Colorado Boulder.
