= John Bryan Ward-Perkins =

British archaeologist (1912–1981)

J. B. Ward-Perkins CMG CBE FBA
- Born: John Bryan Ward-Perkins; 3 February 1912
- Died: 28 May 1981 (aged 69)

Academic background
- Education: Winchester College; New College, Oxford

Academic work
- Discipline: Archaeologist
- Sub-discipline: Classical archaeology; Roman North Africa; Roman sculpture; urban archaeology; architectural history
- Institutions: Magdalen College, Oxford; London Museum; Royal University of Malta; British School at Rome

John Bryan Ward-Perkins, CMG, CBE, FBA (3 February 1912 – 28 May 1981) was a British classical archaeologist and academic, specialising in ancient Rome. He served as director of the British School at Rome from 1946 to 1974.

== Family and early life ==
John Bryan Ward-Perkins was born on 3 February 1912 in Bromley, Kent, the eldest son of Bryan Ward-Perkins, a British civil servant in India, and Winifred Mary Hickman. He attended Winchester College and New College, Oxford, graduating in 1934. He was awarded the Craven travelling fellowship at Magdalen College, which he used to study archaeology in Great Britain and France.

== Career ==
Ward-Perkins served as assistant under Sir R. E. Mortimer Wheeler (1890–1976) from 1936 to 1939 at the London Museum. There he wrote a catalogue of the museum's collection. During these years he was also involved in the excavation of a Roman villa near Welwyn Garden City. In 1939 he became chair of archaeology at the Royal University of Malta.

During the Second World War, Ward-Perkins saw military service in the British Royal Artillery in North Africa. He was assigned to protect the sites of Leptis Magna and Sabratha. There he gained an intimate knowledge of Tripolitania and its Roman ruins. After the war he was appointed as director of the Allied sub-commission for monuments and fine arts in Italy.

In 1946 he accepted the position of Director of the British School at Rome. He maintained a scholarly interest in North Africa, largely because excavation work in Italy remained impossible. When peninsular excavations in Italy did resume, Ward-Perkins obtained aerial photographs from RAF reconnaissance of Italy, to map out excavations. He remained at the British School in Rome until his retirement in 1974.

In the 1950s his interest focused on the technical aspects of Roman construction and resulted in The Shrine of St Peter and the Vatican Excavations (1956) and David Talbot Rice's The Great Palace of the Byzantine Emperors (1958). In 1963 Ward-Perkins revived the stalled publication project of the Corpus signorum imperii Romani, a body of Roman sculpture held in collections throughout the world. He served as visiting professor in numerous institutions, including New York University (1957) and as Rhind Lecturer in Edinburgh in 1960. In 1970 he wrote the Roman section of the prestigious Pelican History of Art volume on Etruscan and Roman architecture, co-authored with Axel Boëthius. His students included the art historian Roger Ling, archaeologist Timothy W. Potter, and ancient historian Barri Jones. Photographs contributed by Ward-Perkins to the Conway Library are currently being digitised by the Courtauld Institute of Art, as part of the Courtauld Connects project.

Ward-Perkins was elected to the American Philosophical Society in 1981.

== Interests ==
Ward-Perkins' major interests were in the materials of ancient art and city topography. He wrote works on city planning in classical Greece and Rome and the historical topography of Veii. He also reinitiated the project to map the Roman Empire, Tabula imperrii romani, which had begun in 1928 but had become inactive. He was instrumental in the founding of the Association for Classical Archaeology, and the issuing of its journal, Fasti Archaeologici. Perhaps one of his most important contributions was the use of field survey to assess archaeological land patterns in Italy, forever changing archaeological inquiry. One of his major survey projects, the South Etruria Survey, produced a body of evidence that remains useful to scholars. In these techniques he was a pioneer, as well as in the field of ancient marble studies.

== Death ==
Ward-Perkins died on 28 May 1981 in Cirencester, Gloucestershire.

== Personal life ==
Ward-Perkins married Margaret Sheilah Long in 1943. She was a daughter of Henry William Long, a lieutenant-colonel in the Royal Army Medical Corps.

Together the couple had three sons and a daughter. One son is the historian Bryan Ward-Perkins.

== Publications ==
- Boëthius, Axel; Ward-Perkins, John Bryan (1970). Etruscan and Roman Architecture. Pelican History of Art (1st ed.). Baltimore/London: Penguin.
  - Revised, split and republished, by Ward-Perkins alone, as Roman Imperial Architecture. London/New York, Penguin Books, 1981.
- David Talbot Rice, ed. The Great Palace of the Byzantine Emperors. Second Report. Edinburgh: University of Edinburgh Press, 1958: 52–104.
- "The Italian Element in Late Roman and Early Medieval Architecture." Proceedings of the British Academy 23 (1947): 163–94.
- and Reynolds, Joyce Maire. The Inscriptions of Roman Tripolitania. Rome: British School at Rome, 1952.
- and Toynbee, J. M. C. The Shrine of St. Peter and the Vatican Excavations. New York: Longmans, Green, 1956.
- The Art of the Severan Age in the Light of Tripolitanian Discoveries. Proceedings of the British Academy 37. London: British Academy, 1953.
- Cities of Ancient Greece and Italy: Planning in Classical Antiquity. New York: G. Braziller, 1974.
- Landscape and History in Central Italy. 2nd J.L. Myres Memorial Lecture. Oxford: B. H. Blackwell, 1965.
- Marble in Antiquity : Collected Papers of J.B. Ward-Perkins. Archaeological Monographs of the British School at Rome 6. London: British School at Rome, 1992.
- Studies in Roman and Early Christian Architecture. London: Pindar Press, 1994.
- "A Carved Marble Fragment at Riom (Puy-de-Dome) and the Chronology of the Aquitanian Sarcophagi." Antiquaries Journal 40 (January–April 1960): 25–34.
- "Nero's Golden House." Antiquity 30 (December 1956): 209–219.
- "The Hunting Baths at Leptis Magna." Archaeologia 93 (1949): 165–195.
