= The Roman Society =

Scholarly society

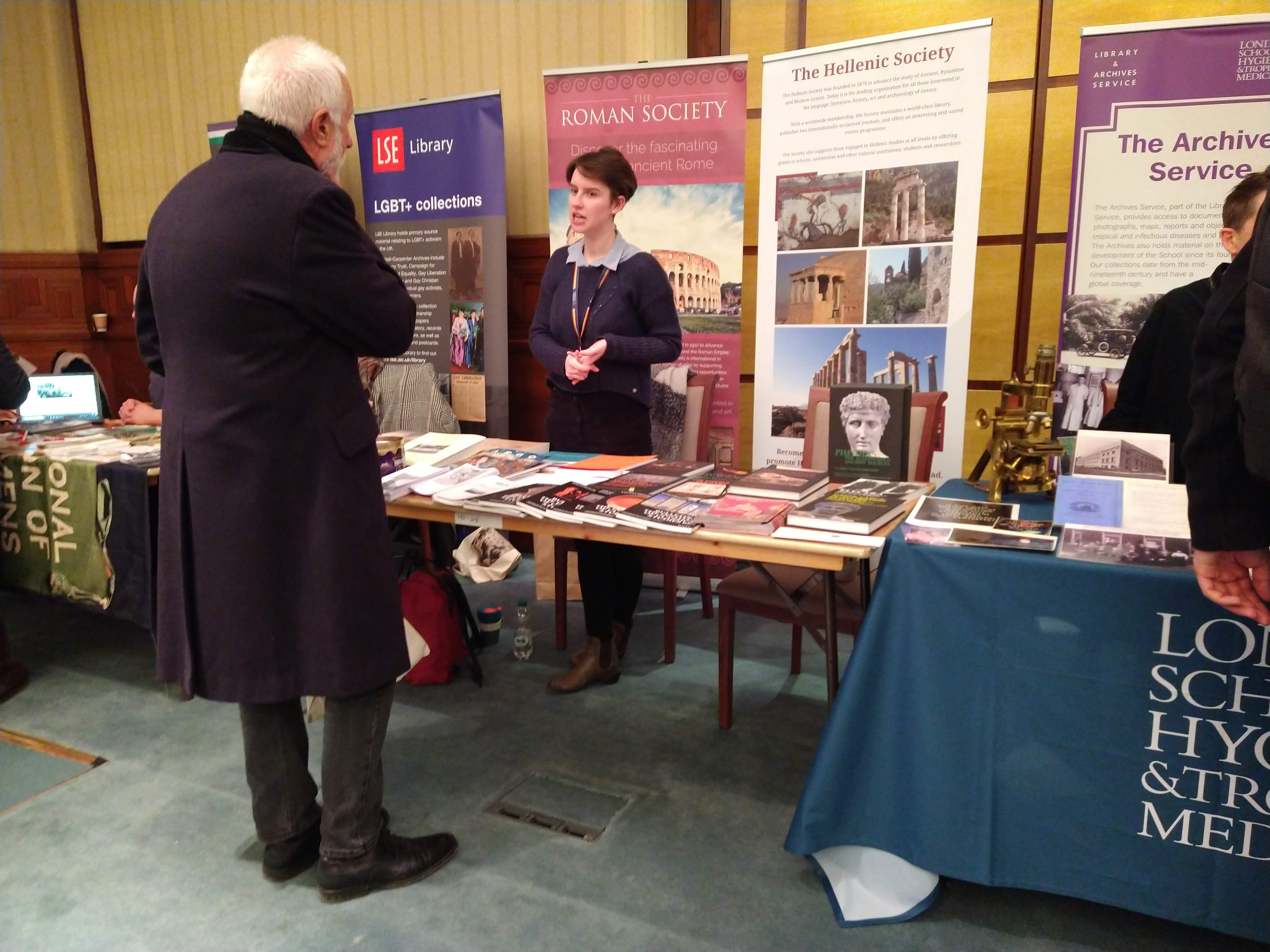
- The Roman Society at the Senate House History Day, 2019
- Formation: 1910
- Type: Learned society
- Registration no.: Charity Commission: 210644
- Location: London, United Kingdom
- Region served: United Kingdom
- President: Hella Eckardt
- Website: romansociety.org

The Society for the Promotion of Roman Studies (The Roman Society) was founded in 1910 as the sister society to the Society for the Promotion of Hellenic Studies.

The Society is the leading organisation in the United Kingdom for those interested in the study of Rome and the Roman Empire. Its scope covers Roman history, archaeology, literature and art.

== History of the society ==
The society was founded at a public meeting in 1910, chaired by Frederic Kenyon, Director of the British Museum, and sponsored by Percy Gardner, George Macmillan, John Penoyre, Francis Haverfield, J. S. Reid, A. H. Smith, G. F. Hill, and G. H. Hallam. The Society's Memorandum and Articles of Association described its major aims as "...to promote Roman studies by creating a library, publishing a journal, and supporting the British School at Rome." The first issue of the Journal of Roman Studies was published in 1911. Early contributors included Francis Haverfield, Eugénie Strong, Albert Van Buren, Elizabeth Van Buren and G. L. Cheesman. Margerie Taylor oversaw the Society from Oxford as secretary from 1923 until 1954, subsequently serving as Honorary Secretary and Editor of JRS. The society celebrated its 50th anniversary in 1960, marked in part by the major exhibition on Art in Roman Britain at Goldsmiths' Hall, London, accompanied by a catalogue by Jocelyn Toynbee. In 1966 a sub-committee was established to consider starting a second journal. The first issue of Britannia was published in 1970, edited by Sheppard Frere.

== Work of the society ==
Journal of Roman Studies
- Discipline: Roman studies
- Language: English
- Edited by: Peter Thonemann

Publication details
- History: 1911–present
- Publisher: Cambridge University Press
- Frequency: Annually

Standard abbreviations
- ISO 4: J. Rom. Stud.

Indexing
- ISSN: 0075-4358 (print); 1753-528X (web)
- LCCN: 26002981
- JSTOR: 00754358
- OCLC no.: 997453470

Links
- Journal homepage; Online access; Online archive

The society produces two annual publications, the Journal of Roman Studies, which contains articles and book reviews dealing with the Roman world in general, and Britannia, which has articles and reviews specifically on Roman Britain. The society also publishes the Britannia Monograph Series, from 1981, and the JRS Monograph Series, from 1982.

A library is maintained jointly with the Hellenic Society and in conjunction with the University of London's Institute of Classical Studies with over 110,000 volumes and 600 current periodicals. The Joint Library was built in-part through review copies from JRS and Britannia.

Grants of the society include: grants for summer schools, archaeology grants (through excavation grants and a biennial conference) and grants for schools for teaching about the Roman world.

There is a programme of public lectures in London, and others outside London arranged with local branches of the Classical Association.

== List of presidents ==
The following persons are or have been president of the society:

- Francis J. Haverfield (1911–1916)
- James S. Reid (1916–1921)
- George Macdonald (1921–1926)
- Henry Stuart Jones (1926–1929)
- Frank Adcock (1929–1931)
- Norman H. Baynes (1931–1934)
- Hugh Last (1934–1937)
- Idris Bell (1937–1943)
- Martin Charlesworth (1943–1948)
- Ronald Syme (1948–1952)
- A.H.M. Jones (1952–1955
- Margery Venables Taylor CBE, MA, FSA (1955–1958)
- Sir Ian Richmond (1958 to 1961)
- Frank Walbank (1961–1965)
- Arnaldo Momigliano (1965–1968)
- J. P. V. D. Balsdon (1968 to 1971)
- Alexander H. McDonald (1971–1974)
- A. Nicholas Sherwin-White (1974–1977)
- A. Leo F. Rivet (1977–1980)
- Peter A. Brunt (1980–1983)
- Sheppard S. Frere (1983–1986)
- Joyce M. Reynolds (1986–1989)
- Fergus G. B. Millar (1989–1992)
- T. Peter Wiseman (1992–1995)
- Averil Cameron (1995–1998)
- John S. Richardson (1998–2001)
- Alan K. Bowman (2001–2005)
- Michael Fulford (2005–2008)
- Andrew Burnett (2008-2012)
- Dominic Rathbone (2012–2015)
- Catharine Edwards (2015–2018)
- Tim Cornell (2018–2022)
- Roy Gibson (2022–2026)
- Hella Eckardt (2026–present)
