= Deforestation during the Roman period =

Result of the geographical expansion of the Roman Empire

Deforestation during the Roman period was a result of the geographical expansion of the Roman Empire, with its increased population, large-scale agriculture, and unprecedented economic development. Roman expansion marks the transition in the Mediterranean from prehistory (around 1,000 BC) to the historical period beginning around 500 BC. Earth sustained a few million people 8,000 years ago and was still fundamentally pristine, but Rome drove human development in Western Europe and was a leading contributor of the deforestation around the Mediterranean.

== Causes ==
=== Housing and building ===
The most basic building supply in the Roman time period was wood. Trees were cut to house increasing populations throughout the Roman Empire. While some Mediterranean houses were built with brick and stone, roof structures, covered with tiles, as well as the floors in multistory apartment buildings were often made of wood.

It is estimated that at one point the Roman Empire had a population of 56.8 million people and an estimated one million or more in Rome alone (a population that was not matched in size in Europe until London in the 19th century). and by other estimates up to 70 million.

=== Fuel ===
Wood was essential fuel in industries like mining, smelting, and the making of ceramics.

=== Agriculture ===
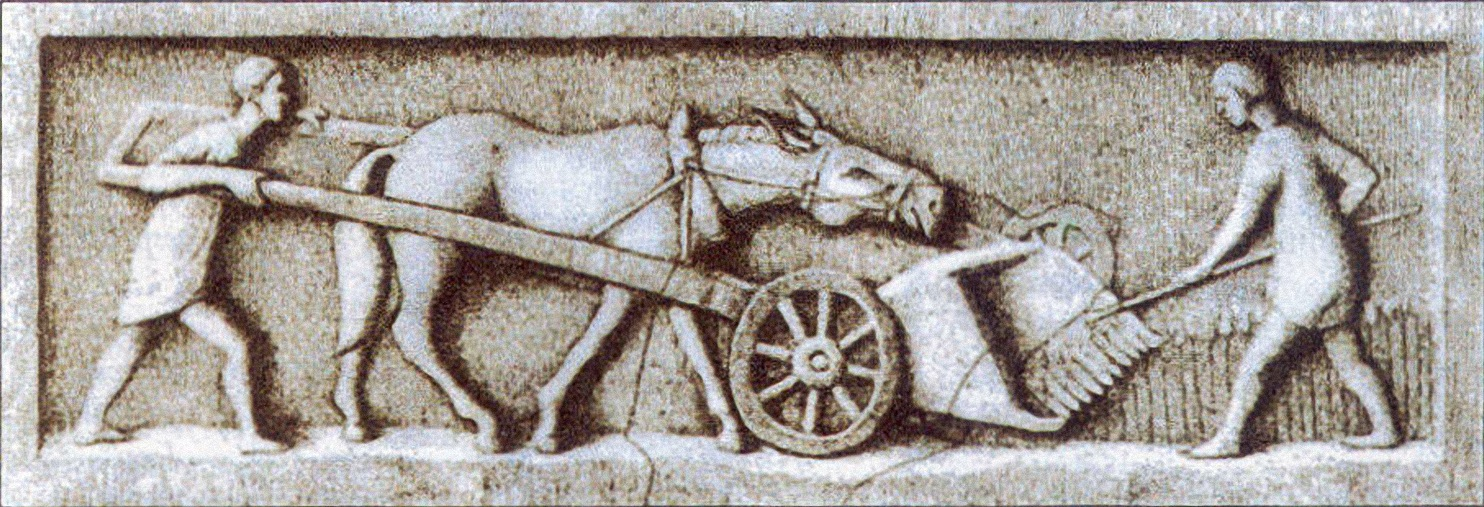
Roman harvesting machine from Trier, Germany

Agriculture was the economic base for the Roman Empire. With an ever-increasing population, the clearing of land for crops was a primary cause of initial deforestation. Human hands gave way to iron ploughs and harvesting machines, and the use of animals to clear dense forests to utilize the rich topsoil.

Agriculture produced commodities that contributed to the economic prosperity of the Romans, who relied on the crops produced from the slaves/landowners. As a result, in 111 BC Roman law allowed anyone who occupied public land of up to 20 acres (81,000 m^{2}) to keep it, provided it was brought into cultivation. This type of policy created widespread clearing and reflected the importance of agriculture, not only to the affluent, but also to citizens, to the military and to merchants engaged in trade with other regions.

In Chapter 5 ("Roman Soil Erosion") of the book by Way of the Soil by Guy Theodore Wrench, the author describes the devastating effects which widespread deforestation and the subsequent overworking of the land to grow increasing amounts of grain for the Roman Empire's burgeoning population had on the land:

=== Animals and overgrazing ===
A major contributor to the environmental degradation and barrier to the regeneration of forests was the grazing of domestic animals. Animals grazed and destroyed land areas unsuitable for cultivation. The consumption of hillside plants and young trees caused erosion, stripping hillsides of soils and eventually exposing bare rock. Silt and gravel would wash down off the hills and mountains creating other problems such as flooding, siltation, and filled-in marshlands.

=== Military ===
With natural resources dwindling, maintaining a strong Roman army for the conquering of new lands was vital. Military campaigns devastated the countryside. Some farmers were forced to fight instead of caring for the land. When natural resources were depleted in already occupied regions of the Roman Empire, the military was sent to not only to defend lands of the Romans, but also to accumulate other areas of interest that had a plentiful supply of timber to accommodate the needs of the Roman economy.

Julius Caesar himself ordered troops to cut down forests to prevent sneak attacks. Deforestation ensured that the forests could not provide cover and camouflage for Rome's enemies. The size of the standing army was about 300,000 and increased to 600,000 toward the late Empire period. Roman legions deforested areas where they camped or marched to reduce the cover where their adversaries could hide and or mount a sneak attack. The military utilized these resources and built fortresses, along with tools and transportation to carry supplies where needed.

=== Shipbuilding ===
Shipbuilding was a major contributor to deforestation and was of great economic and military significance. The importance attached to the supply of timber for building ships cannot be denied; ships were crucial to the burgeoning economic life of the Mediterranean, and sea power was vital in the exercise of political control. Warships had priority over merchant vessels in competition for materials.

Thousands of ships were built during this classical period. At times of war, hundreds could be built within a month. This put tremendous pressure on supply of usable timbers. Consequently, one effect of shipbuilding centers was the scarcity of timber in their immediate areas. Then, after immediate areas were depleted of wood resources, the transportation of wood timbers from other areas was the next option. Transportation was expensive, but increasing numbers of ships were needed to maintain naval dominance.

=== Urbanization ===
Early urbanization of Rome and surrounding areas was focused around the ability to obtain natural resources. Lowland areas and areas close to water transports were highly urbanized first, but as population increased along with trade and manufacturing, imperial expansion and colonization of conquered territories was needed. The environment underwent drastic degradation as pollution from the burning of fuelwood filled the air and smelters that used wood as fuel transmitted heavy metals into the atmosphere.

The creation of large cities contributed to deforestation in the classical world. Overcrowding forced citizens to move to the hillsides where forests once stood to build their homes.

== Consequences of deforestation ==
=== Soil ===
With an increased demand for resources and food, constant pressure was put upon the land and soil to provide food for a growing economy. Regular clearing and plowing exhausted existing soil, which eventually became infertile. Runoff and eroded soil from deforested hillsides increased the amount of silt and impeded the flow of water into agricultural areas.

Eventually, due to the Mediterranean climate and the increased depletion of soil nutrients from hundreds of years of harvesting, yields diminished. Rainwater that had been locked into the soil through vegetation and forests was now running off too quickly, with each raindrop unprotected by plants or by a litter layer.

=== Flooding/harbors and ports ===
Erosion accelerated up to twentyfold in the 3rd century, creating unusable marshlands, which spread diseases such as malaria. Flooding from runoff disrupted water supply to natural springs and rivers, but also increased siltation to coastal areas and harbours at river deltas. Rains washed away the unprotected earth and greatly altered coastlines, in some cases, pushing them many miles farther out to sea as in the case around the mouths of the Po River.

The washing away of topsoil and deposits of silt and gravel meant that harbors and ports needed to be moved, causing further burden upon the economy. Even in the city of Rome, floods covered the lower parts of the city and backed up the sewers. The first such flood was noted in 241 BC; records indicate increased flooding of the river from that time onward.

=== Reflections and awareness ===
Clearing for agricultural needs and for heat was a necessity for long-term survival in Roman times, though there is a debate as to whether the Romans understood the implications of deforestation. Richard Grove said, "states will act to prevent environmental degradation only when their economic interests are shown to be directly threatened." The Romans did have some forms of ecological conservation though. Recycling of glassware was practiced along with architectural design that utilized solar heating. Forests were also under government regulations and protected for future resources.

In the 5th century BC Plato complained that "the loss of timber had denuded the hills and plains surrounding Athens and caused massive soil erosion." Cicero also noted "we (humans) are the masters of what the earth produces," and "all things in this world which men employ have been created and provided for the sake of men."

== Interpretations ==
=== Conjecture on Roman collapse ===
Tainter argued that "deforestation did not cause the Roman collapse," but that one could make a case as to being a part of it. As Williams wrote, it is more likely that constant war, ravaging epidemics, rebellion, invasion from outside, a declining population, and an excessive degree of urbanization, separately or in combination, operated on the land in an empire that had extended beyond its means.

In the 2011 environmental book Life Without Oil by Steve Hallett, the author argues that the collapse of the Roman Empire may have been linked to a peak wood scenario in the Mediterranean Basin. He suggests that, as wood had to be hauled from ever further away, the law of diminishing returns undermined the economic performance of Roman industry, leaving Rome vulnerable to the other, well documented problems of invasion and internal division. They discuss this as cautionary tale comparing it to contemporary society's potential fate under a post-peak oil scenario.

=== Scholarly discussions ===
Environmental historian J. Donald Hughes (1932–2019) was one of the researchers who made significant contributions to studying deforestation of the ancient Mediterranean region since 1975. In 2011, he wrote: "The consensus of historians, geographers, and other scholars from the mid-nineteenth century through the first three quarters of the twentieth century was that human activities had depleted the forests to a major extent and caused severe erosion. My research confirmed this general picture. Since then, revisionist historians have questioned these conclusions, maintaining instead that little environmental damage was done to forests and soils in ancient Greco-Roman times." Hughes cited The Corrupting Sea: A Study of Mediterranean History (2000) by Peregrine Horden and Nicholas Purcell amongst the milder challengers of this consensus: "[W]hile admitting that forests were destroyed by factors such as overgrazing and mining, [Horden and Purcell] opine that such damage was rare and localized, and that deforestation was seen as a "Good Thing" because it improved the landscape for agriculture."

More skeptical has been the reaction from authors A.T. Grove and Oliver Rackham (2001, 2003), who argued that almost all of the scholarly conclusions about severe deforestation and erosion in the Roman Mediterranean were based on an unhistorical projection of present concerns onto the past. This alternative view argues that there are immense complexities of time, space, climate, geology and topography which, when combined with our extremely fragmentary information, makes generalizations almost impossible. Some crops – dates, figs, olives, chestnuts – played a very important role in Roman agriculture. Grains were often intercultivated with these crops. Almost all species of trees grow again when cut down. Cutting down a wood does not, by itself, destroy woodland. Coppicing is one way in which wood could be harvested on a sustainable basis, for example. Hughes summarised this reaction as revisionist, writing that Grove and Rackham sought to explain away evidence of human-made deforestation, and reversed the burden of proof by demanding incontrovertible evidence to the contrary. (Note: "These are conclusions that go against the weight of opinion of students of historical land use who have been investigating these questions since the middle of the nineteenth century. Scholars active today may not be convinced by Grove and Rackham, who, whenever putative evidence arises for deforestation caused by human action, exhaust themselves in a search for ways to explain it away, and demand unassailable proof from those who judge that the evidence shows that humans cause forest removal.")

Hypocausts were pre-adapted to burn poor quality fuels like straw as well as coal. There is a good reason to believe that both straw and coal were important fuels in antiquity, especially in Roman Britain where coal was abundant in many areas. A great deal of protection against soil erosion arises from terracing hillsides. We do not know how extensive terraces were in antiquity but a good deal of the soil erosion here assumed to be caused by the Romans, may well date to the Dark Ages when the maintenance of terraces broke down. Changes in tree cover may well arise from differences in climate, which are still not well understood. But there is some evidence that the decline of the Roman West is linked to climate change.

Slash-and-burn agriculture, associated with lower populations than the Roman period, can be at least as responsible for deforestation and soil erosion as Roman agriculture. Coastal marshes can be caused by sea level changes quite as much as soil erosion. There may be reasons to believe that tree diseases as early as 6,000 years ago caused the elm decline but that this tree decline was related in some complex way to the practices of Neolithic farmers.

== See also ==
- Agriculture in ancient Greece § Forestry
- Classical demography
- The First Eden: The Mediterranean World and Man

== Sources ==
- Hughes, J. Donald; Thirgood, J. V. (1982). "Deforestation, Erosion, and Forest Management in Ancient Greece and Rome". Journal of Forest History. 26 (2). Forest History Society, American Society for Environmental History, Forest History Society and The American Society for Environmental History, Oxford University Press: 60–75. doi:10.2307/4004530. ISSN 0094-5080. JSTOR 4004530.
- Hughes, J. Donald (1994). Pan's Travail. Baltimore: Johns Hopkins University Press. ISBN 978-0801853630.
- Hughes, J. Donald (2001). An Environmental History of the World. New York: Routledge. ISBN 0-203-28539-5.
- Hughes, J. Donald (2011). "Ancient Deforestation Revisited". Journal of the History of Biology. 44 (1). Springer: 43–57. ISSN 0022-5010. JSTOR 41488387.
- Chew, Sing C. (2001). World Ecological Degradation: Accumulation, Urbanization, and Deforestation, 3000BC-AD2000. Walnut Creek: AltaMira. ISBN 978-0759100312.
- Rackham, Oliver; Grove, Alfred Thomas (2003). The Nature of Mediterranean Europe: An Ecological History (2. printing, with corr. ed.). New Haven, Conn.; London: Yale University Press. p. 174. ISBN 9780300100556.
- Runnels, Curtis N. (1995). "Environmental Degradation in Ancient Greece". Scientific American. 272 (3). Scientific American, a division of Nature America, Inc.: 96–99. ISSN 0036-8733. JSTOR 24980377.
- Williams, Michael (2006). Deforesting the Earth: From Prehistory to Global Crisis. An Abridgement. Chicago: University of Chicago. ISBN 0-226-89926-8.
