= Meiron =

Ancient site in north Israel

Meiron ميرون Mirun, Meron, Meroon, Marun, Meirun, Mairun
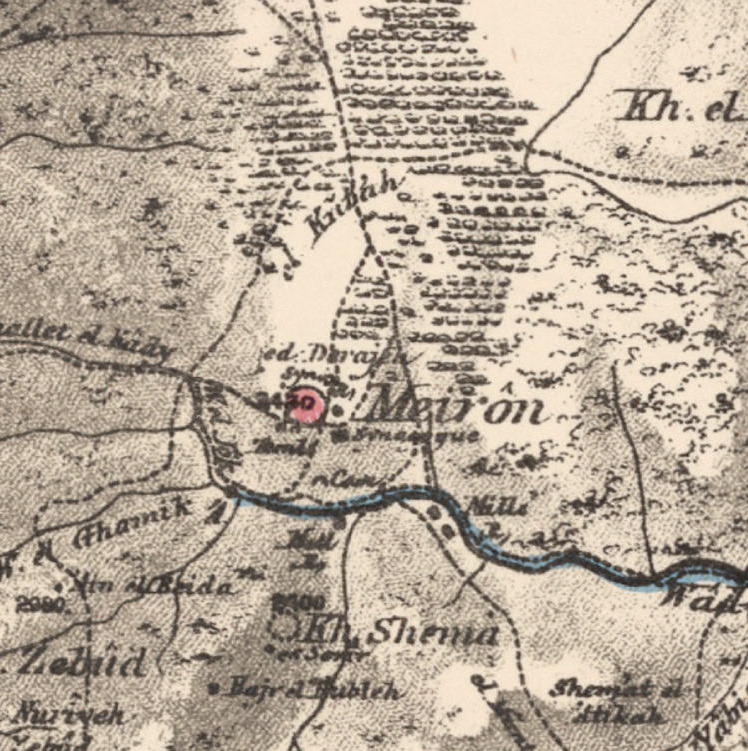
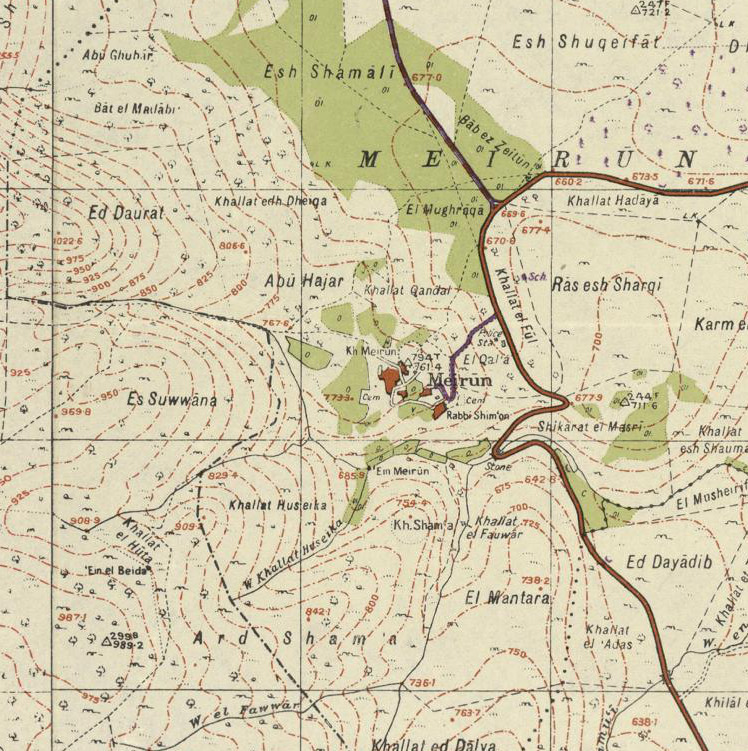
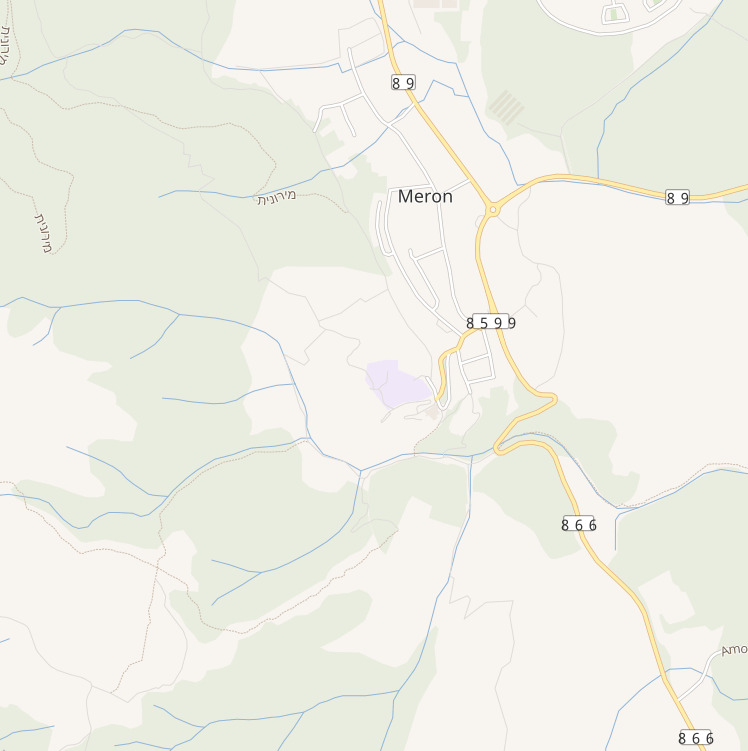
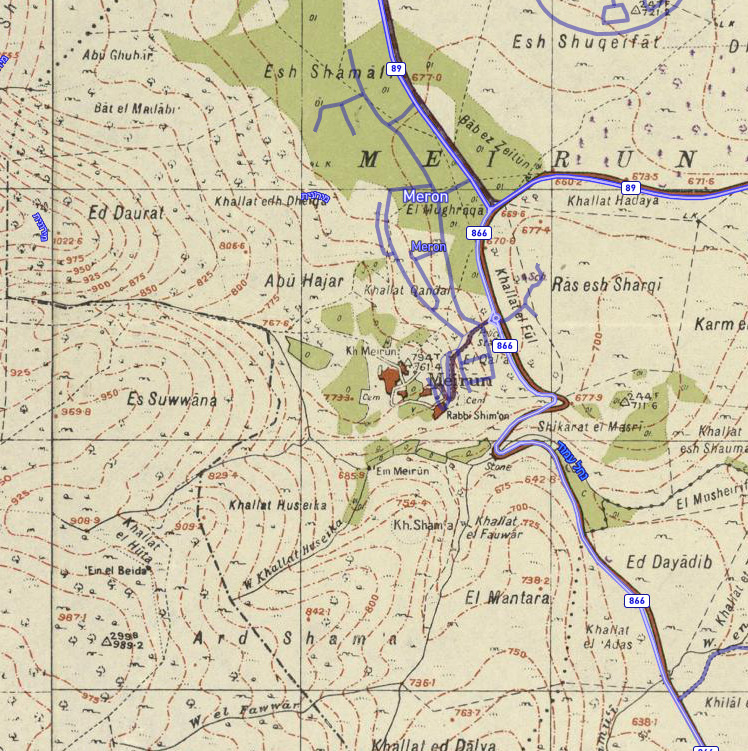
- 1870s map 1940s map modern map 1940s with modern overlay map A series of historical maps of the area around Meiron (click the buttons)

- Location within Mandatory Palestine
- Coordinates: 32°58′56″N 35°26′17″E
- Palestine grid: 191/265
- Geopolitical entity: Mandatory Palestine
- Subdistrict: Safad
- Date of depopulation: May 10–12, 1948

Area
  - Total: 14,114 dunams (14.114 km^{2}; 5.449 sq mi)

Population (1945)
  - Total: 290
- Cause(s) of depopulation: Influence of nearby town's fall
- Current Localities: Meron

Meiron (Arabic: ميرون, romanized: Mayrūn; Hebrew: מירון הקדומה, romanized: Merón haKdumá) was a Palestinian village, located 5 kilometers (3.1 mi) west of Safad. Associated with the ancient Canaanite city of Merom, excavations at the site have found extensive remains from the Hellenistic and Early Roman periods. The remains include a 3rd-century synagogue, attesting to Meiron's prominence as a local religious centre.

From the 13th century CE onward, Meiron was a popular site for Jewish pilgrims. During Ottoman rule in Palestine, the population fluctuated considerably, with at least two-thirds of the population being Arab Muslims although landownership was split almost evenly between Arabs and Jews. The village was depopulated in two phases during the 1948 Arab–Israeli war. In 1949, demobilized soldiers founded the moshav of Meron in the region.

== History and archaeology ==
Archaeological excavation on Mount Meron started in the 1920s. Substantial remains from the Roman period were found but only meager findings from earlier times. The theory that Ein Meron spring at the foot of the mountain could be the "waters of Merom" of Joshua 11:5 and Joshua 11:7 was thus hard to support. In the 1950s, Israeli archaeologist Yohanan Aharoni rejected the notion of a pre-Roman settlement at Meron. In the decade up to 2005 however, new findings seemed to indicate that the site atop Mount Meron was inhabited continuously from the Chalcolithic until after the Roman period. This reinvigorated the debate over the identification of Merom and its "waters". American archaeologists Eric M. and Carol L. Meyers excavated ancient Meiron in 1971–72, 1974–75, and 1977.

=== Location ===
The ancient site of Meron stood on a high hill on the eastern side of Mount Meron, above (north of) Nahal Meron ('Meron Stream') and the Meron spring, its remains being found at the summit of the hill and on its slopes.

=== Settlement periods ===
Flint findings indicate human activity at the site during the Middle Paleolithic period, but as of 2019 archaeologists consider that settlement started there during the Chalcolithic and it became continuous from that period and up until the present day.

A Jewish settlement from part of the Roman and Byzantine periods, or Mishnaic (c. 10-220 CE) and Talmudic periods (3rd to 6th centuries) in Jewish terms, was excavated in the 1970s.

During the Late Ottoman period, Oliphant (1887) described a mixed Jewish and Muslim settlement, and in the British Mandate it was an Arab village (Khalidi 1992).

=== Middle Palaeolithic and Chalcolithic periods ===
During a 2017 excavation above Nahal Meron on the southern slope of the hill of ancient Meron, surface finds of flint implements and debitage hardened the conclusion of earlier work that human activity took place at the Meron site very early on, namely in the Middle Palaeolithic, and again in either the Chalcolithic period or the Bronze Age. Previous archaeological work had established that settlement at the site of ancient Meron had begun during the Chalcolithic period and had been continuous since.

At three small digs executed by Yossi Stepansky of the Israel Antiquities Authority (IAA) in the early 2000s near the cave of Rabbi Shimon Bar Yochai and at the Bar Yochai Yeshiva in Meiron, Chalcolithic pottery and fragments of cultic objects made of basalt came to light.

=== Bronze and Iron Ages ===
The association of Meiron with the ancient Canaanite city of Merom or Maroma has long had its supporters, though the prolonged absence of hard archaeological evidence meant that other sites a little further north, thus today located in southern Lebanon, such as Marun ar-Ras or Jebel Marun, have also been considered. Merom is mentioned in 2nd millennium BCE Egyptian sources, and in Tiglath-pileser III's accounts of his expedition to the Galilee in 733-732 BCE (where it is transcribed as Marum). Writing several decades after Aharoni, Israeli archaeologist Avraham Negev nevertheless identified Meiron with Bronze and Iron Age Merom, mentioned in the Book of Joshua in the syntagm "water of Merom" and in extra-biblical sources as mrm.

In the same 2000 dig near the cave of Rabbi Shimon Bar Yochai mentioned above, Stepansky also excavated sherds and cultic basalt fragments from the Early Bronze Age I.

At an area north of the center of the long-known Roman-period Meron, a 2004 dig cleared three Bronze Age layers. A round installation and pottery were dated to the Middle Bronze IIA, underneath it was an Intermediate Bronze Age layer containing a floor and import pottery from Syria, followed by an even earlier Intermediate Bronze Age layer with pottery sherds and flint implements.

At the digs on the grounds of the yeshiva, Stepansky discovered pottery from the Iron Age, the Persian and the Hellenistic periods.

=== Classical antiquity ===
Excavations at Meiron found artifacts dating to the Hellenistic period at the foundation of the site. The economic and cultural affinities of the inhabitants of the Meiron area at this time were directed toward the north, to Tyre and southern Syria in general. Josephus fortified a town of Mero or Meroth ahead of the First Jewish-Roman War; some however identify that Meroth with a site located further north, possibly today's Marun ar-Ras, while others prefer the archaeologically more convincing Marus.

A. Negev identifies the site with Bronze and Iron Age Merom, writing that it was known by the Second Temple period as Meron, with Josephus calling it Meroth. It is mentioned in the Talmud as being a village in which sheep were reared, that was also renowned for its olive oil. The Reverend R. Rappaport ventured that merino, the celebrated wool, may have its etymological roots in the name for the village.

A tower which still stands at a height of 18 feet (5.5 m) was constructed in Meiron in the 2nd century CE. In the last decade of the 3rd century CE, a synagogue was erected in the village. Known as the Meiron synagogue, it survived an earthquake in 306 CE, though excavations at the site indicate that it was severely damaged or destroyed by another earthquake in 409 CE. "One of the largest Palestinian synagogues in the basilica style," it is the earliest example of the so-called 'Galilean' synagogue, and consists of a large room with eight columns on each side leading to the facade and a three-doored entrance framed by a columned portico. Artifacts uncovered during digs at the site include a coin of Emperor Probus (276-282 CE) and African ceramics dating to the latter half of the 3rd century, indicating that the city was commercially prosperous at the time. Coins found in Meiron are mostly from Tyre, though a large number are also from Hippos, which lay on the other side of Lake Tiberias. Peregrine Horden and Nicholas Purcell write that Meiron was a prominent local religious centre in the period of late Antiquity.

Some time in the 4th century CE, Meiron was abandoned for reasons as yet unknown.

=== Early Islamic to Mamluk periods ===
Denys Pringle describes Meiron as a "[f]ormer Jewish village," with a synagogue and tombs dating to the 3rd and 4th centuries, noting the site was later reoccupied between 750 and 1399.

In the 12th century, Benjamin de Tudela, a Navarrese rabbi, visited Meiron and described a cave of tombs located there believed to hold the remains of Hillel, Shammai, and "twenty of their disciples and other Rabbis." On his visit to Meiron in 1210, Samuel ben Samson, a French rabbi, located the tombs of Simeon bar Yochai and his son Eleazar b. Simeon there. A contemporary of the second Jewish revolt against Rome (132-135 CE), bar Yochai is most known for his color appearances in the Talmud and as the (pseudepigraphic) mystical narrator of the Zohar.

Incidentally, he is venerated by Moroccan Jews, whose veneration of saints is thought to be an adaptation of local Muslim customs. From the 13th century onward, Meiron became the most frequented site of pilgrimage for Jews in Palestine.

In the early 14th century, Arab geographer al-Dimashqi mentioned Meiron as falling under the administration of Safad. He reported that it was located near a "well-known cave" where Jews and possibly non-Jewish locals travelled to celebrate a festival, which involved witnessing the sudden and miraculous rise of water from basins and sarcophagi in the cave.

=== Ottoman period ===
Palestine was incorporated into the Ottoman Empire in 1517, and in 1555 the villagers paid a tax on silk spinning. By the 1596 tax register, Meiron was located in the nahiya ("subdistrict") of Jira, part of Sanjak Safad. It was registered as a large village, with 115 households and 15 bachelors, an estimated 715 persons, all Muslims. The village paid taxes on goats, beehives, and a press that processed either grapes or olives; a total of 13,810 akçe. In 1609, Rabbi Shlumil of Safad wrote that there were many synagogues in ruins and empty of people.

Turkish traveller Evliya Çelebi, who visited about 1648, told that as the Jewish festival approached, thousands of people, "mostly Druzes, Timānis, Yezīdies and Mervāvis", gathered inside a cave at Meiron. Then on the day of the festival, large rock basins that were usually dry miraculously filled with water. The water was thought to be a single tear of Yaqub (Jacob) and had marvelous healing properties. As "Meiron water", it was exported to many countries.

A map from Napoleon's invasion of 1799 by Pierre Jacotin showed the place, named as "Merou".

Meiron suffered relatively minor damage in the Galilee earthquake of 1837. It was reported that during the earthquake the walls of the tombs of Rabbi Eleazer and Rabbi She-Maun were dislodged, but did not collapse.

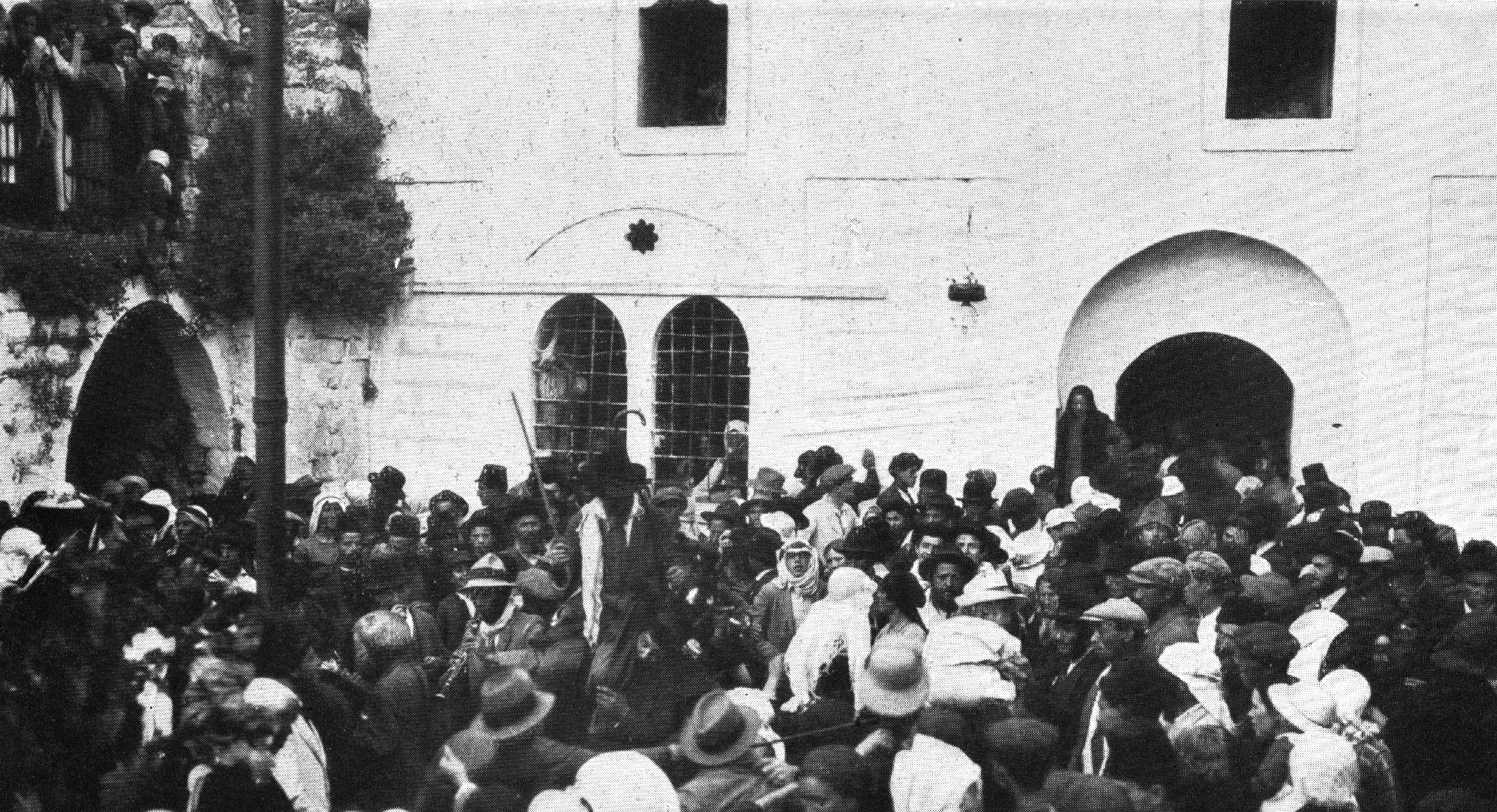
Jewish pilgrims in Meiron, c. 1920.

A number of European travellers came to Meiron over the course of the 19th century and their observations from the time are documented in travel journals. Ulrich Seetzen, who visited in 1806–1807, wrote: "Near Meirun there were many olive trees and some vineyards. This small village lies on a rocky mountain in an unfruitful region and is inhabited only by seven Muslim and two Druze families."

Edward Robinson, who visited Meiron during his travels in Palestine and Syria in the mid-19th century, describes it as "a very old looking village situated on a ledge of bristling rocks near the foot of the mountain. The ascent is by a very steep and ancient road [...] It is small, and inhabited only by Muhammedans." The tombs of Simeon bar Yochai, his son R. Eleazar, and those of Hillel and Shammai are located by Robinson as lying within a khan-like courtyard underneath low-domed structures that were usually kept closed with the keys held in Safad. Robinson indicates that this place was the focal point of Jewish pilgrimage activities by his time; the synagogue is described as being in ruins.

Laurence Oliphant also visited Meiron sometime in the latter half of the 19th century. His guide there was a Sephardic rabbi who owned the land that made up the Jewish quarter of the village. Oliphant writes that the rabbi had brought 6 Jewish families from Morocco to till the land, and that they and another 12 Muslim families made up the whole of the village's population at the time. Karl Baedeker described it as a small village that appeared quite old with a Muslim population. In 1881 the PEF's Survey of Western Palestine (SWP) described Meiron as a small village of 50 people, all Muslims, who cultivated olives.

A population list from about 1887 showed Meiron to have about 175 inhabitants, all Muslim.

=== British Mandate period ===
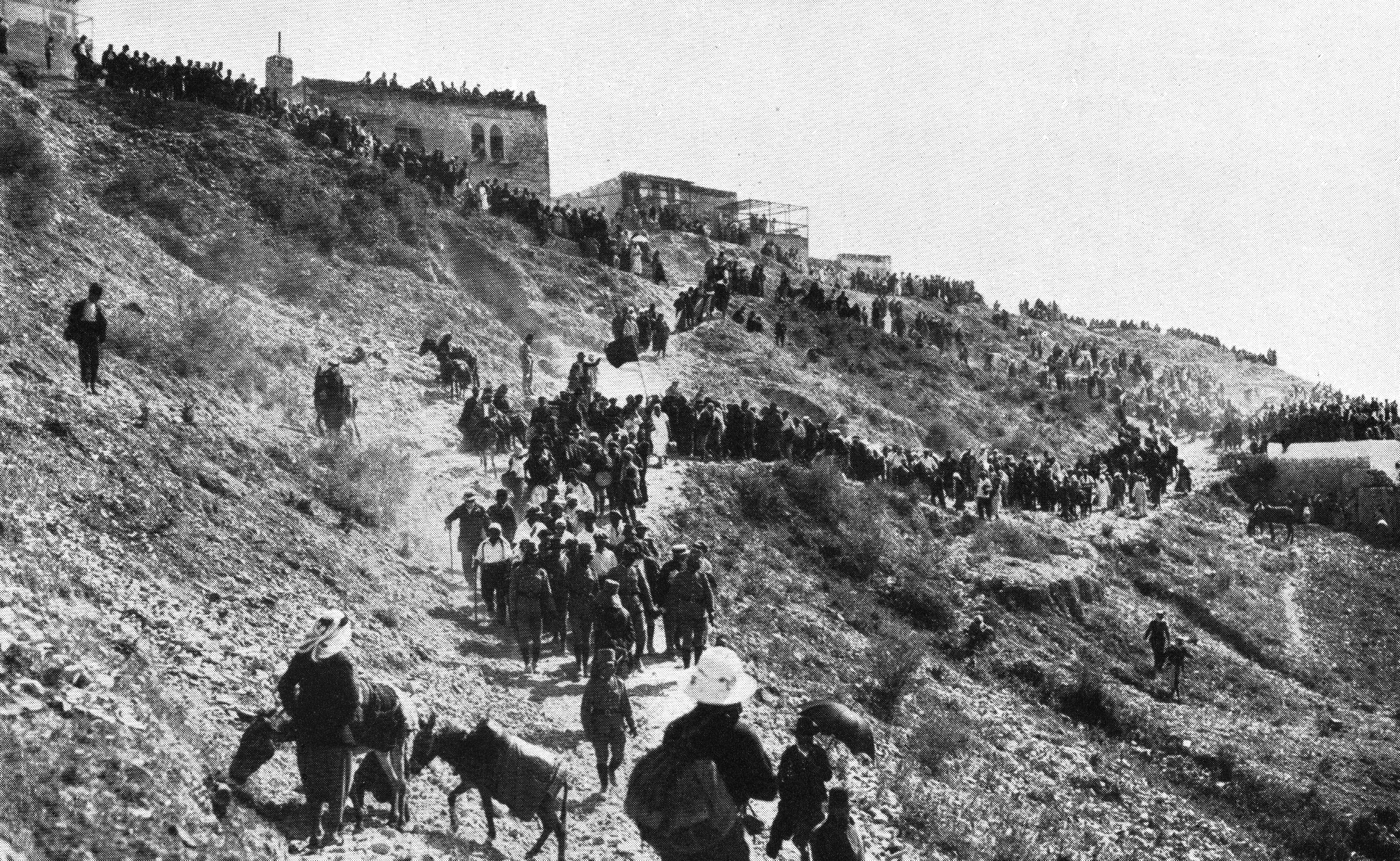
Jewish pilgrims on the way to Meiron, c. 1920.

Towards the end of World War I, the ruins of the Meiron synagogue were acquired by the "Fund for the Redemption of Historical Sites" (Qeren le-Geulat Meqomot Histori'im), a Jewish society headed by David Yellin.

In the 1922 census of Palestine conducted by the British Mandate authorities, Mairun had a population of 154; all Muslims. By 1931, Meiron consisted of an Arab and Jewish quarter, with the former being the larger one and the latter being built around the tomb of Simeon bar Yochai. That year, there were 158 Arabs and 31 Jews in Meiron; a total of 189 people, in 47 houses.

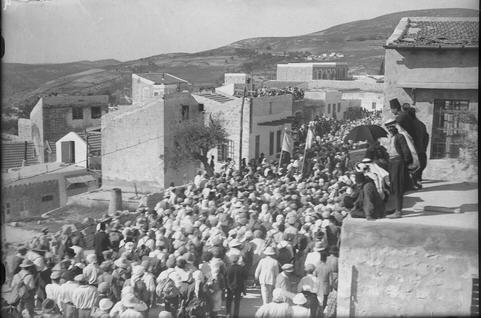
bar Yochai celebrations, Meiron, 25 May 1927

In the 1945 statistics, conducted toward the end of the British Mandate in Palestine, depicted an entirely Muslim population of 290 people. Meiron had a boy's elementary school. Agriculture and livestock was the dominant economic sectors of the village, with grain being the primary crop, followed by fruits. Around 200 dunams of land were planted with olive trees, and there were two presses in the village used to process olives.

=== 1948 War and aftermath ===
Meiron's villagers were driven out in two waves: one shortly after the capture of Safad by Haganah on 10–11 May 1948, and the other at the end of October 1948, after Meiron itself was occupied. According to Nafez Nazzal, three Israeli planes bombed Meiron, together with the villages of Tarshiha, Safsaf and Jish during Operation Hiram on October 28, and many villagers were killed. One Israeli account states that there were 80 dead left after the defenders had withdrawn.

=== State of Israel ===
Ancient Meiron was excavated in the 1970s by the American couple, Eric M. and Carol L. Meyers.

Jewish pilgrimages to Meron continue to be held annually on Lag BaOmer, which falls between Passover and Shavuot, at which time hundreds of thousands of Jews gather at the tomb of Shimon bar Yochai to partake in days of festivities, that include the lighting of bonfires at night.

== Jewish religious significance ==
It seems that Meron was first regarded as sacred at a time when traditions associated it with the grave of Joshua Bin Nun.

What is sure is that Galilean Jewish tradition sees Meron as the burial place of major Jewish sages of the Tanna'im and Amora'im generations, primarily Hillel the Elder, Yohanan ha-Sandlar and Rabbi Shim'on bar Yochai. Their alleged sacred powers made Meron into a central pilgrimage site for religious Jews who are still visiting the tombs of the tzadikim. For the last thousand years, starting in the Middle Ages, Jewish pilgrims have written about their experiences regarding Meron.

== See also ==
- Depopulated Palestinian locations in Israel
- Khirbet Shema, ancient site across the valley from Meron, with alleged tomb of Shammai

== Bibliography ==
- Aharoni, Y.; Rainey, A. (1979). The Land of the Bible: A Historical Geography. Westminster John Knox Press. ISBN 9780664242664.
- Barron, J.B., ed. (1923). Palestine: Report and General Abstracts of the Census of 1922. Government of Palestine.
- Benjamin Ben Jonah of Tudela (1841). Adolf (Abraham) Asher (ed.). The Itinerary of Rabbi Benjamin of Tudela.
- Bromiley, G.W. (1995). The International Standard Bible Encyclopedia: A-Z. Wm. B. Eerdmans Publishing. ISBN 9780802837851.
- Conder, C.R.; Kitchener, H.H. (1881). The Survey of Western Palestine: Memoirs of the Topography, Orography, Hydrography, and Archaeology. Vol. 1. London: Committee of the Palestine Exploration Fund.
- David, Avraham (1990). "The Jewish Settlement in Palestine at the Beginning of the Ottoman Empire (1517-1599)". In Alex Carmel, Peter Schäfer and Yossi Ben-Artzi (ed.). The Jewish Settlement in Palestine 634-1881. Wiesbaden: Dr. Ludwig Reichert Verlag.
- Department of Statistics (1945). Village Statistics, April, 1945. Government of Palestine.
- Fine, S. (2005). Art and Judaism in the Greco-Roman World: Toward a New Jewish Archaeology. Cambridge University Press. ISBN 9780521844918.
- Friedland, Roger; Hecht, Richard D. (1996). To Rule Jerusalem. Cambridge University Press. ISBN 9780521440462.
- Groh, D.E. (1989). E. Livingstone (ed.). Papers Presented to the Tenth International Conference on Patristic Studies Held in Oxford 1987. Peeters Publishers. ISBN 9789068312317.
- Hadawi, S. (1970). Village Statistics of 1945: A Classification of Land and Area ownership in Palestine. Palestine Liberation Organization Research Center.
- Herzog, C. (1982). The Arab-Israeli Wars. War and Peace in the Middle East. Arms and Armour Press. ISBN 0-85368-367-0.
- Horden, P.; Purcell, N. (2000). The Corrupting Sea: A Study of Mediterranean History. Blackwell Publishing. ISBN 9780631218906.
- Hütteroth, W.-D.; Abdulfattah, K. (1977). Historical Geography of Palestine, Transjordan and Southern Syria in the Late 16th Century. Erlanger Geographische Arbeiten, Sonderband 5. Erlangen, Germany: Vorstand der Fränkischen Geographischen Gesellschaft. ISBN 3-920405-41-2.
- Karmon, Y. (1960). "An Analysis of Jacotin's Map of Palestine" (PDF). Israel Exploration Journal. 10 (3, 4): 155–173, 244–253. Archived from the original (PDF) on 2019-12-22.
- Khalidi, W. (1992). All That Remains: The Palestinian Villages Occupied and Depopulated by Israel in 1948. Washington D.C.: Institute for Palestine Studies. ISBN 0-88728-224-5.
- Meyers, C.; Meyers, E. "Eric M. and Carol L. Meyers Papers, 1970 - 1980". University Archives, Duke University.
- Mills, E., ed. (1932). Census of Palestine 1931. Population of Villages, Towns and Administrative Areas. Jerusalem: Government of Palestine.
- Morris, B. (2004). The Birth of the Palestinian Refugee Problem Revisited. Cambridge University Press. ISBN 978-0-521-00967-6.
- Nazzal, Nafez (1978). The Palestinian Exodus from Galilee 1948. The Institute for Palestine Studies. ISBN 978-0-88728-128-0.
- Negev, A.; Gibson, S. (2001). Archaeological Encyclopedia of the Holy Land. Continuum International Publishing Group. ISBN 0826413161.
  - Entry 'Meiron', pp. 330–331.
  - Entry 'Merom; water of Merom; Meron', p. 332.
- Negev & Gibson (2005 edition), ISBN 9780826485717
- Oliphant, L. (1887). Haifa, or Life in Modern Palestine.
- Pringle, D. (1997). Secular Buildings in the Crusader Kingdom of Jerusalem: An Archaeological Gazetteer. Cambridge University Press. ISBN 9780521460101.
- Rhode, H. (1979). Administration and Population of the Sancak of Safed in the Sixteenth Century (PhD). Columbia University. Archived from the original on 2020-03-01.
- Robinson, E.; Smith, E. (1841). Biblical Researches in Palestine, Mount Sinai and Arabia Petraea: A Journal of Travels in the year 1838. Vol. 3. Boston: Crocker & Brewster. (pp. 333 ff, 367, 2nd appendix, p. 134)
- Robinson, E. (1856). Later Biblical Researches in Palestine, and in the Adjacent Regions: A Journal of Travels in the Year 1852. Drawn Up from the Original Diaries, with Historical Illustrations, with New Maps and Plans. Crocker & Brewster. ISBN 9781404787926.
- Safrai, Z. (1998). The Missing Century: Palestine in the Fifth Century : Growth and Decline. Peeters Publishers. ISBN 9789068319859.
- Schumacher, G. (1888). "Population list of the Liwa of Akka". Quarterly Statement - Palestine Exploration Fund. 20: 169–191.
- Ulrich Seetzen. Dr. Kruse (ed.). Ulrich Jasper Seetzen's Reisen durch Syrien, Palästina, Phönicien, die Transjordan-Länder, Arabia Petraea und Unter-Aegypten. Berlin: G. Reimer.
- Stemberger, Günter; Tuschling, Ruth (2000). Jews and Christians in the Holy Land: Palestine in the Fourth Century. Continuum International Publishing Group. ISBN 9780567086990.
- Urman, Dan; Flesher, Paul Virgil McCracken (1998). Ancient Synagogues: Historical Analysis and Archaeological Discovery. BRILL. ISBN 9789004112544.
- Vilnay, Z. (2003). Legends of Palestine. Kessinger Publishing. ISBN 9780766141285.
- Zangenberg, Jürgen; Attridge, H.W.; Martin, D. (2007). Religion, Ethnicity, and Identity in Ancient Galilee: A Region in Transition. Mohr Siebeck. ISBN 9783161490446.
