= Alexander Hugh McDonald =

Ancient historian and classicist

A. H. McDonald FBA
- Born: 15 May 1908
- Died: 9 July 1979 (aged 71)

Academic background
- Education: Auckland Grammar School
- Alma mater: Auckland University College; Clare College, Cambridge

Academic work
- Discipline: Classicist
- Sub-discipline: Ancient history; Latin language; Livy
- Institutions: Nottingham University College; University of Sydney; Clare College, Cambridge; British School at Rome

Alexander Hugh McDonald, FBA (15 May 1908 – 9 July 1979) was a New Zealand-born ancient historian and classicist whose career was spent in England and Australia.

== Early life and education ==
Born on 15 May 1908 in New Zealand, McDonald was the son of a Scottish Presbyterian minister. He attended Auckland Grammar School and then Auckland University College, graduating with a first-class degree in Latin and Greek. In 1930, he went to England to study classics at Clare College, Cambridge. He secured a first in part II of the Tripos and won an exhibition and research award, enabling him to complete a PhD on the Roman historian Livy, which was awarded by the University of Cambridge in 1936.

== Academic career ==
In 1934, McDonald was appointed to a lectureship in ancient history at Nottingham University College. He struck up friendships with F. W. Walbank (with whom he sometimes collaborated), Ulrich Kahrstedt, F. E. Adcock, Hugh Last and W. B. Anderson. Following the death of S. K. Johnson, he was invited to prepare an edition of books 31 to 40 of Livy's Ab Urbe Condita Libri for the Oxford Classical Texts series. McDonald moved to Australia in 1939 to become Reader in Ancient History at the University of Sydney; there, he was acting Professor of Latin in 1945 and that year was appointed the inaugural Professor of Ancient World History at the university. A highly regarded lecturer, McDonald was also a commentator in broadcasting, edited The Australian Outlook and authored works on Japanese imperialism and international relations in the Pacific region.

McDonald left Australia in 1952 to take up a lectureship in ancient history at the University of Cambridge and a fellowship at Clare College. This gave him more time to focus on his research; he published the OCT edition of Livy (books 31 to 35) in 1965, which was the first modern, critical edition of the work. He also authored Republican Rome (1966). Additional appointments followed: he was chair of the Archaeological Faculty at the British School at Rome from 1967 to 1970, president of the Cambridge Philological Society from 1968 to 1970 and president of the Society for the Promotion of Roman Studies from 1971 to 1974. He also received various honours, including two honorary doctorates, the Doctor of Letters (DLitt) degree from Cambridge, and elected a Fellow of the British Academy (FBA) in 1967. He retired from his lectureship in 1973. In the 1970s, his health deteriorated and he was unable to complete the next five books of Livy for the OCT series (which he had been working on) before he died on 9 July 1979.
