= Alan Bowman =

Alan Bowman may refer to:

- Alan Bowman (classicist) (born 1944), British classicist and academic
- Alan Bowman (American football) (born 2000), American football player
