= Balsdon =

Balsdon is a surname. Notable people with the surname include:

- Grace Balsdon (born 1993), English field hockey player
- Greg Balsdon (born 1977), Canadian curler
- J. P. V. D. Balsdon (1901–1977), British historian
- Megan Balsdon (born 1982), Canadian curler
