= Warneford =

Warneford is a surname and a given name. Notable people with the name include:

== Surname ==
- John Warneford (1720–1773), British clergyman and scholar
- Reginald Warneford (1891–1915), Royal Naval Air Service officer
- Samuel Wilson Warneford (1763–1855), British cleric and philanthropist

== Given name ==
- Warneford Cresswell (1897–1973), English footballer

== See also ==
- Warneford Place
- Warnford
