= Peter Brunt =

British academic and ancient historian (1917-2005)

P. A. Brunt FBA
- Born: Peter Astbury Brunt; 23 June 1917; Coulsdon, Surrey
- Died: 5 November 2005 (aged 88); Oxford, Oxfordshire
- Education: Oriel College, Oxford
- Occupations: Academic, ancient historian
- Title: Camden Professor of Ancient History
- Term: 1970–1982
- Predecessor: Ronald Syme
- Successor: Fergus Millar

Peter Astbury Brunt FBA (23 June 1917 – 5 November 2005) was a British academic and ancient historian. He was Camden Professor of Ancient History at the University of Oxford from 1970 to 1982. During his career, he lectured at the University of St Andrews, Oriel College, Oxford, Gonville and Caius College, Cambridge, and Brasenose College, Oxford.

== Early life ==
Brunt was born on 23 June 1917 in Coulsdon, Surrey, to the Rev Samuel Brunt, a Methodist minister, and Gladys Eileen Brunt (née Blewett). He was educated at Ipswich School, a public school in Ipswich, Suffolk. In 1935, he won a scholarship to study history at Oriel College, Oxford. The decision to study modern history was based on his belief that his Ancient Greek, specifically his composition, was not good enough to win a scholarship to read classics. However, he did change to classics and took a First in Mods in 1937 and a First in Greats in 1939.

Having graduated with a double first, he was awarded the Craven Fellowship in 1939. However, with the outbreak of World War II, his academic career went on hold. He volunteered but flat feet prevented him from serving in the military. Instead, he joined the Ministry of Shipping, later the Ministry of War Transport, as a civil servant. He served as Temporary Assistant Principal, and later Temporary Principal. His main duties involved the relinquishing of French ships, and dealing with the legal and diplomatic fallout from this. He additionally spent his nights on fire fighting duty with the Air Raid Precautions. His work as a civil servant allowed him to develop some skill as an administrator and afforded him experiences that he might not have had as a student. Notably, during air-raid duties he made the acquaintance of his fellow worker Violet Bonham Carter, and in the Ministry of Shipping he started a long friendship with the numismatist Derek Allen.

== Academic career ==
In 1946, having been released from war-service, he returned to the University of Oxford. He became a Senior Demy (graduate scholar) of Magdalen College, and took up the Craven Fellowship he had been awarded before the war in 1939. There, he undertook research on the influence of Stoicism at Rome under the direction of Professor Hugh Last, and on the relations between governed and governors in the Roman Empire. While studying at the British School at Rome, he came to the belief that archaeological evidence could only be used to confirm something one already knew. In 1947, he was offered a lecturing position. He stopped his doctoral research and took up the appointment of lecturer in Ancient History at the University of St Andrews. He found living in St Andrews difficult as he had to vacate his rooms during the summer months and this disrupted his research.

He returned to the University of Oxford in 1951 and joined Oriel College as fellow and tutor in ancient history. One focus of interest during this period was that of ancient slavery. He also lectured on Thucydides in the first few years, and he wrote a revised edition of Jowett's translation of History of the Peloponnesian War with a new introduction in 1963. He served as Dean of Oriel College from 1959 to 1964. From 1968 to 1970, he left Oxford University to serve as Bursar of Gonville and Caius College, University of Cambridge. During this time he completed two books., one of which—Italian Manpower, 225 BC-AD 14 (Oxford University Press, 1971)—was arguably the most innovative book about Roman history written in English since the Second World War. In 1970, he was elected Camden Professor of Ancient History and joined Brasenose College, University of Oxford, as a professorial fellow.

Outside of university, he held a number of positions. He was editor of The Oxford Magazine for two years from 1963 to 1964. He was a delegate of the Oxford University Press from 1971 to 1979. He served as a member of the council of the British School at Rome from 1972 to 1987. He was President of the Society for the Promotion of Roman Studies from 1980 to 1983.

He retired early in 1982 because of ill-health.

== Later life ==
After retirement, Brunt stayed in Oxford and continued his academic research. He revised a number of past papers and wrote new chapters to produce and publish three new books; on the Roman republic in 1988, the Roman Empire in 1990, and on Ancient Greece in 1992. He lived with his mother until her death.

In autumn 2005, a cancerous tumour was discovered in his oesophagus but he refused treatment. He died on 5 November 2005 after spending time in the Sobell House Hospice, Oxford.

== Personal life ==
Brunt developed a close relationship with one of his students at the University of St Andrews. However, she rejected his marriage proposal. She moved to America and married someone there. He never contemplated marriage after that, remaining a lifelong bachelor, and her photograph remained on his bookcase until his death.

He had become an atheist by the time he had started university.

== Honours ==
Brunt was elected Fellow of the British Academy (FBA) in 1969. In 1973, he was awarded an honorary fellowship at his alma mater Oriel College, Oxford.

== Selected works ==
- Italian Manpower 225 B.C.–A.D. 14. Oxford: Clarendon Press. 1971.
- Social Conflicts in the Roman Republic. Chatto & Windus, London 1971.
- The Fall of the Roman Republic and Related Essays. Clarendon Press, Oxford 1988.
- Roman Imperial Themes. Clarendon Press, Oxford 1990.
- Studies in Greek History and Thought. Clarendon Press, Oxford 1993.

Academic offices
Preceded by Sir Ronald Syme	Camden Professor of Ancient History, Oxford University; 1970–1982	Succeeded by Fergus Millar
