= The Corrupting Sea =

2000 book by Peregrine Horden and Nicholas Purcell

- First edition
- Author: Peregrine Horden and Nicholas Purcell
- Subject: Mediterranean history
- Publisher: Wiley-Blackwell
- Publication date: 7 April 2000
- Media type: Print
- Pages: 776 pages (paperback)
- ISBN: 978-0631218906

The Corrupting Sea: A Study of Mediterranean History is a book written by Peregrine Horden and Nicholas Purcell and published in 2000. The book is regarded as revolutionizing Mediterranean studies, introducing important concepts such as micro-ecologies and 'history of,' rather than 'history in'.

Environmental historian J. Donald Hughes (1932–2019), a prominent researcher on deforestation during the Roman period, cited The Corrupting Sea amongst the milder challengers of the scholarly consensus that human activity in the ancient Greco-Roman Mediterranean world led to severe deforestation and soil erosion: "[W]hile admitting that forests were destroyed by factors such as overgrazing and mining, [Horden and Purcell] opine that such damage was rare and localized, and that deforestation was seen as a "Good Thing" because it improved the landscape for agriculture."

== Bibliography ==
- Hughes, J. Donald (2011). "Ancient Deforestation Revisited". Journal of the History of Biology. 44 (1). Springer: 43–57. ISSN 0022-5010. JSTOR 41488387.
