= Valentina Arena =

Valentina Arena ^{FSA} is a professor of Ancient History. She is the Camden Professor of Ancient History at the University of Oxford, a post established in 1622. She is also a Professorial Fellow of Brasenose College, Oxford. Arena was previously Professor of Ancient History at University College London. She is an expert on the history of ancient ideas and political thought, particularly in the Roman Republic. Her work focuses on antiquarianism, Varro, ancient philosophy of language, and Roman constitutionalism.

== Education ==
Arena received her BA from the University of Florence. She was awarded her PhD from University College London in 2002. The title of her doctoral thesis was Democratic Ideas and Political Practice in the Late Roman Republic.

== Research and career ==
Arena received a Consolidator Grant from the European Research Council (ERC) for her project, "Ordering, Constructing, Empowering: Fragments of the Roman Republican Antiquarians" (2020–25). The project explores antiquarianism in the Roman Republic. She is currently co-editing the first volume of the Cambridge History of Democracy.

Arena previously worked at the British Museum in the Department of Coins and Medals. She was Lecturer, Reader and Professor at University College London before her appointment as the Camden Professor of Ancient History at Oxford. She is the 26th person to hold the post, and is the first woman.

Arena was elected a Fellow of the Society of Antiquaries in 2022. She contributed to the BBC Radio 4's programme In Our Time on Cicero.

== Bibliography ==
- (ed. by V. Arena and J. R. W. Prag), A Companion to the Political Culture of the Roman Republic (New York-London, 2022)
- (ed. by V. Arena), Liberty: Ancient Ideas and Modern Perspectives (Routledge, 2020)
- (ed. by V. Arena and G. Piras), Reconstructing the Republic: Varro and Imperial Authors, special issue of Res Publica Litterarum 39 (2018)
- (ed. by V. Arena and F. Mac Góráin), Varronian Moments, special issue of the Bulletin of Classical Studies (2017)
- V. Arena, Libertas and the Practice of Politics in the Late Roman Republic (Cambridge, 2012)

Academic offices
Preceded by Nicholas Purcell	Camden Professor of Ancient History; University of Oxford; 2024-present	Incumbent
