= British School at Rome =

Interdisciplinary research centre in Italy

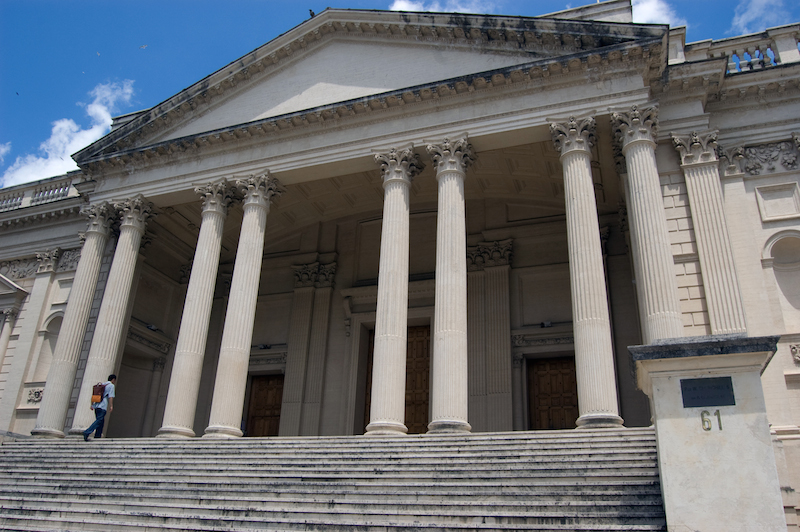
- The British School at Rome, designed by Sir Edwin Lutyens
- Established: 1901
- Coordinates: 41.9183°N 12.4812°E
- Type: Research centre Humanities and visual arts
- Director: Abigail Brundin (2021–present)
- President: Princess Alexandra
- Website: bsr.ac.uk

The British School at Rome (BSR) is a British interdisciplinary research centre supporting the arts, humanities and architecture established in Rome. Historical and archaeological study are at the core of its activities.

== History ==
The British School at Rome (BSR) was established in 1901 and granted a UK Royal Charter in 1912. Its mission is "to promote knowledge of and deep engagement with all aspects of the art, history and culture of Italy by scholars and fine artists from Britain and the Commonwealth, and to foster international and interdisciplinary exchange."

Following the International Exhibition of Art in Rome in 1911, the site of the Edwin Lutyens-designed British Pavilion in the Valle Giulia was granted to the UK on condition that it be used exclusively as a British research centre for archaeology, history and the fine arts. In 1916, after significant adaptation by Lutyens, the BSR moved into what is still its home. In 2002, a purpose-built lecture theatre and gallery spaces, designed by Hugh Petter and sponsored by the Sainsbury family, were opened by Princess Alexandra. The BSR is immediately adjacent to the Villa Borghese gardens and the Galleria Nazionale d'Arte Moderna.

== Awards and fellowships ==
The BSR awards residential scholarships and fellowships to artists and scholars from the Commonwealth for periods of three to twelve months. The awardees live in the BSR building and have access to its specialist reference library. Recipients of the fine art awards are provided with studio and workshop facilities.

Awards, based on an open access application system, are made in the following fields: Archaeology of Italy and the Mediterranean; Late Antique and Medieval History; Renaissance and Enlightenment studies; Modern Italian Studies; Architectural History; Architecture including Landscape Architecture; contemporary visual arts practice.

=== Fine Arts awards ===
- Abbey Fellowship in Painting (three-month residency)
- Abbey Scholarship in Painting (nine-month residency)
- Arts Council of Northern Ireland Fellowship (three-month residency)
- Augusta Scholarship (three-month residency)
- The Bridget Riley Fellowship (six-month residency)
- BSR Wallace New Zealand Residency (three-month residency)
- Conseil des Arts et des Lettres, Québec Residency (three-month residency)
- Creative Wales – British School at Rome Fellow (three-month residency)
- Derek Hill Foundation Scholarship (three-month residency)
- Helpmann Academy Resident (three-month residency)
- National Art School, Sydney, Resident (three-month residency)
- Rome Fellowship in Contemporary Art (three-month residency)
- Rome Prize in Architecture (six-month residency)
- Sainsbury Scholarship in Painting and Sculpture (one-year residency)
- Scholars' Prize in Architecture (three-month residency)

=== Humanities awards ===
- Balsdon Fellowship (three-month senior fellowship)
- Hugh Last Fellowship (three-month senior fellowship)
- Paul Mellon Centre Rome Fellowship (three-month senior fellowship)
- Coleman-Hilton Scholarship (University of Sydney) (six-month residency)
- CRASSH–BSR Research Fellow (with funding from the Isaac Newton Fund) (six-month residency)
- Giles Worsley Rome Fellowship (three-month residency)
- Henry Moore Foundation – BSR Fellowship in Sculpture (three-month residency)
- John Murray / Keats – Shelley Memorial Association Creative Writing Resident (three-month residency)
- Judith Maitland Memorial Award (three-month residency)
- Macquarie Gale Rome Scholarship (six-month residency)
- Mougins Museum Rome Awards (three-month residency)
- Rome Award (three-month residency)
- Rome Fellowship (nine-month residency)

== Governance and leadership ==
The British School at Rome is one of the sponsored institutes of the British Academy, whilst maintaining itself as an autonomous body. It receives financial support from the British Academy, award sponsors, private donors and its membership, and is a registered charity under English law.

The BSR is led by a Director, who has traditionally been a senior scholar in the fields of Classical history, art history, or archaeology.

=== List of directors ===
- Gordon McNeil Rushforth – First Director
- Sir Henry Stuart-Jones (1903–1905)
- Thomas Ashby (1906–1925)
- Bernard Ashmole (1925–1928)
- Arthur Smith (1928–1930, 1932)
- Ian Richmond (1930–1932)
- Arthur Smith (1932) – Second term
- Colin Hardie (1933–1936)
- Ralegh Radford (1936–1939)
- No director during World War II (1939–1945)
- John Bryan Ward-Perkins (1946–1974)
- Dr David Whitehouse (1974–1984)
- Professor Donald A. Bullough (1984) – Acting Director
- Professor Graeme Barker (1984–1988)
- Professor Richard Hodges (1988–1995)
- Professor Andrew Wallace-Hadrill (1995–2009)
- Professor Christopher Smith (2009–2017)
- Professor Stephen Milner (2017–2020)
- Professor Chris Wickham (2020–September 2021)
- Professor Abigail Brundin (September 2021–present)

== Notable alumni ==
=== Fine arts ===
- Gillian Ayres RA
- Jane Boyd
- Richard Billingham
- Marc Camille Chaimowicz
- Marvin Gaye Chetwynd
- Adam Chodzko
- Judith Cowan (sculptor)
- Anthony Eyton RA
- Stephen Farthing RA
- Denzil Forrester
- Bethan Huws
- Chantal Joffe
- Winifred Knights
- Julian Opie
- Cornelia Parker RA
- Eddie Peake
- Elizabeth Price
- Laure Prouvost
- John Skeaping RA
- Bob and Roberta Smith RA
- Emma Stibbon RA
- Daniel Sturgis
- Joe Tilson RA
- Mark Wallinger
- Alison Wilding RA
- Cerith Wyn Evans
- Marvin Gaye Chetwynd
- Soheila Sokhanvari
- Kimathi Donkor
- Cathy Lomax

=== Humanities ===
- David Abulafia FBA (Professor of Mediterranean History, University of Cambridge)
- Nicholas Cullinan (Director, National Portrait Gallery)
- Penelope Curtis (Director, Calouste Gulbenkian Museum, formerly Director of Tate Britain)
- Rose Ferraby (Director of Aldborough Roman Town Project)
- Nicholas Purcell FBA (Camden Professor of Ancient History, University of Oxford)

== Bibliography ==
- T. P. Wiseman, A Short History of the British School at Rome, 1990
- A. Wallace-Hadrill, The British School at Rome: One Hundred Years, 2001

== See also ==
- Académie de France at Rome
- American Academy in Rome
- British School at Athens
- Deutsche Akademie Rom Villa Massimo
- Deutsches Archäologisches Institut Rom
- École française de Rome
- Romanian Academy in Rome
- Villa Borghese gardens
