= Abigail Brundin =

British professor of Italian

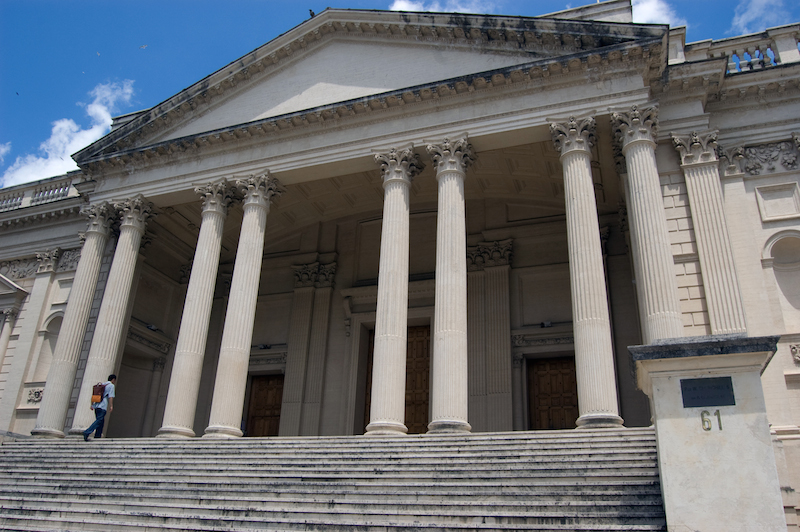
The British School at Rome

Abigail Brundin is professor of Italian and the first female Director of the British School at Rome. She is an expert on the literature and culture of Italy in the renaissance and early modern periods. Prior to her appointment at the BSR, she was Professor of Italian in the Faculty of Modern & Medieval Languages, and a Fellow of St Catharine's College, Cambridge.

== Education ==
Brundin received her PhD degrer from the University of Cambridge in 2000. Her thesis was titled Vittoria Colonna, 1490–1547: Petrachism and Evangelism in Sixteenth-Century Italy.

== Career ==
Brundin was appointed as lecturer in the Department of Italian at the University of Cambridge in 2002, and as a Fellow of St Catharine's College in 2000.

Brundin's work focuses on the culture and literature of renaissance and early-modern. She has published on women writers in the early history of printing, beginning with Vittoria Colonna, an Italian poet. She has published on poetry in convents, literature and religious reform, and devotional culture of the home. In 2013, she collaborated with the National Trust to research and curate an exhibition of Italian books at Belton House, Lincolnshire.

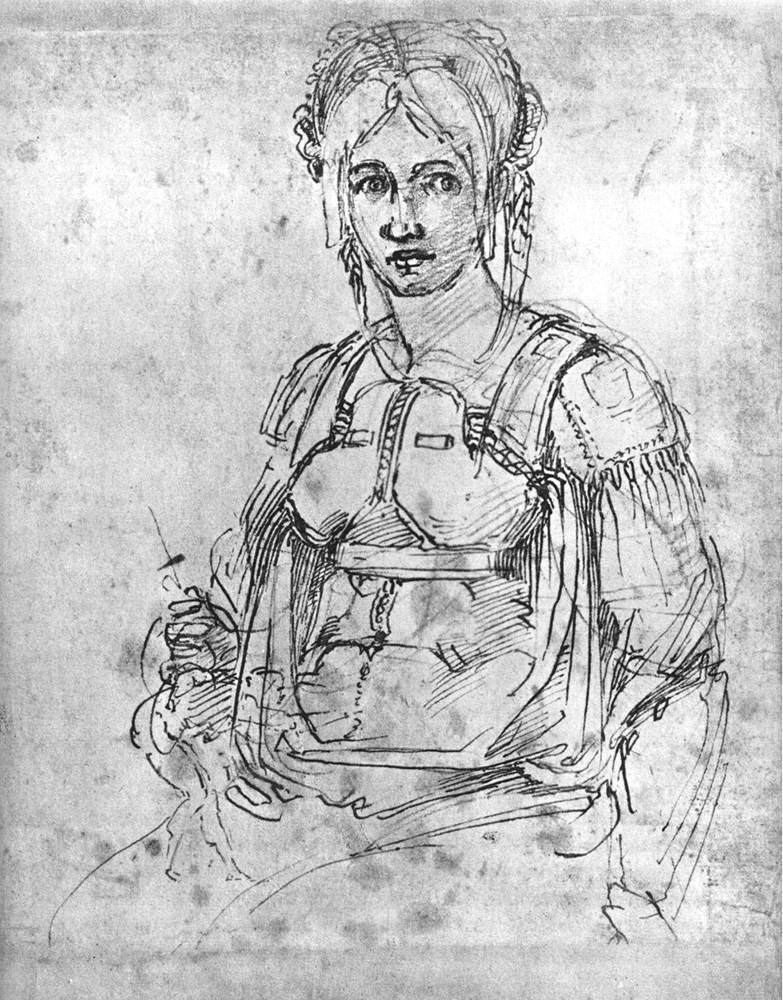
Vittoria Colonna, drawn by Michelangelo

Brundin co-led the project Domestic Devotions: The Place of Piety in the Italian Renaissance Home, 1400–1600, which was funded by a grant of £2.4m from the European Research Council. In 2017, the project developed the exhibition Madonnas and Miracles: the Holy Home in Renaissance Italy, in collaboration with the Fitzwilliam Museum, Cambridge. The exhibition was visited by around 50,000 people. The project book, The Sacred Home in Renaissance Italy, was co-authored by Brundin with Deborah Howard and Mary Lavern and was published by Oxford University Press in 2018. The book won the Bainton Prize for History/Theology, and received an Honorable Mention for the Society for Renaissance Studies Book Prize.

Since its establishment in 1901, the British School in Rome has had eighteen directors, none of whom have been women. Brundin began her Directorship at the British School in Rome in September 2021, taking over from interim Director Chris Wickham.

== Selected bibliography ==
- Abigail Brundin, Deborah Howard, Mary Laven, The Sacred Home in Renaissance Italy (Oxford: Oxford University Press, 2018)
- Companion to Vittoria Colonna, ed. Abigail Brundin, Tatiana Crivelli and Maria Serena Sapegno (Leiden: Brill, 2016)
- Forms of Faith in Sixteenth-Century Italy, ed. Abigail Brundin and Matthew Treherne (Aldershot: Ashgate, 2009)
- Vittoria Colonna and the Spiritual Poetics of the Italian Reformation. Catholic Christendom 1200–1650 (Aldershot: Ashgate, 2008)
- Vittoria Colonna, Sonnets for Michelangelo, ed. and trans. Abigail Brundin. The Other Voice in Early Modern Europe (Chicago and London: Chicago University Press, 2005)
