= Camden Professor of Ancient History =

Academic post at University of Oxford

The Camden Professorship of Ancient History at the University of Oxford was established in 1622 by English antiquary and historian William Camden, Clarenceux King of Arms, and endowed with the income of the manor of Bexley, becoming the first and oldest chair of history in England. Since 1877 it has been attached to Brasenose College, and since 1910 it has been limited to Roman history.

== List of Camden Professors ==
List of holders of the chair since its foundation:

1. Degory Wheare 1622–1647
2. Robert Waryng 1647–1648
3. Lewis du Moulin 1648–1660
4. John Lamphire 1660–1688
5. Henry Dodwell 1688–1691
6. Charles Aldworth 1691–1720
7. Sedgwick Harrison 1720–1727
8. Richard Frewin 1727–1761
9. John Warneford 1761–1773
10. William Scott (later Lord Stowell) 1773–1785
11. Thomas Warton 1785–1790
12. Thomas Winstanley 1790–1823
13. Peter Elmsley 1823–1825
14. Edward Cardwell 1825–1861
15. George Rawlinson 1861–1889
16. Henry Francis Pelham 1889–1907
17. Francis John Haverfield 1907–1919
18. Henry Stuart Jones 1920–1927
19. John Anderson 1927–1936
20. Hugh Last 1936–1949
21. Ronald Syme 1949–1970
22. Peter Brunt 1970–1982
23. Fergus Millar 1984–2002
24. Alan Bowman 2002–2010
25. Nicholas Purcell 2011–2023
26. Valentina Arena 2024–
