= Judith Cowan (sculptor) =

British artist

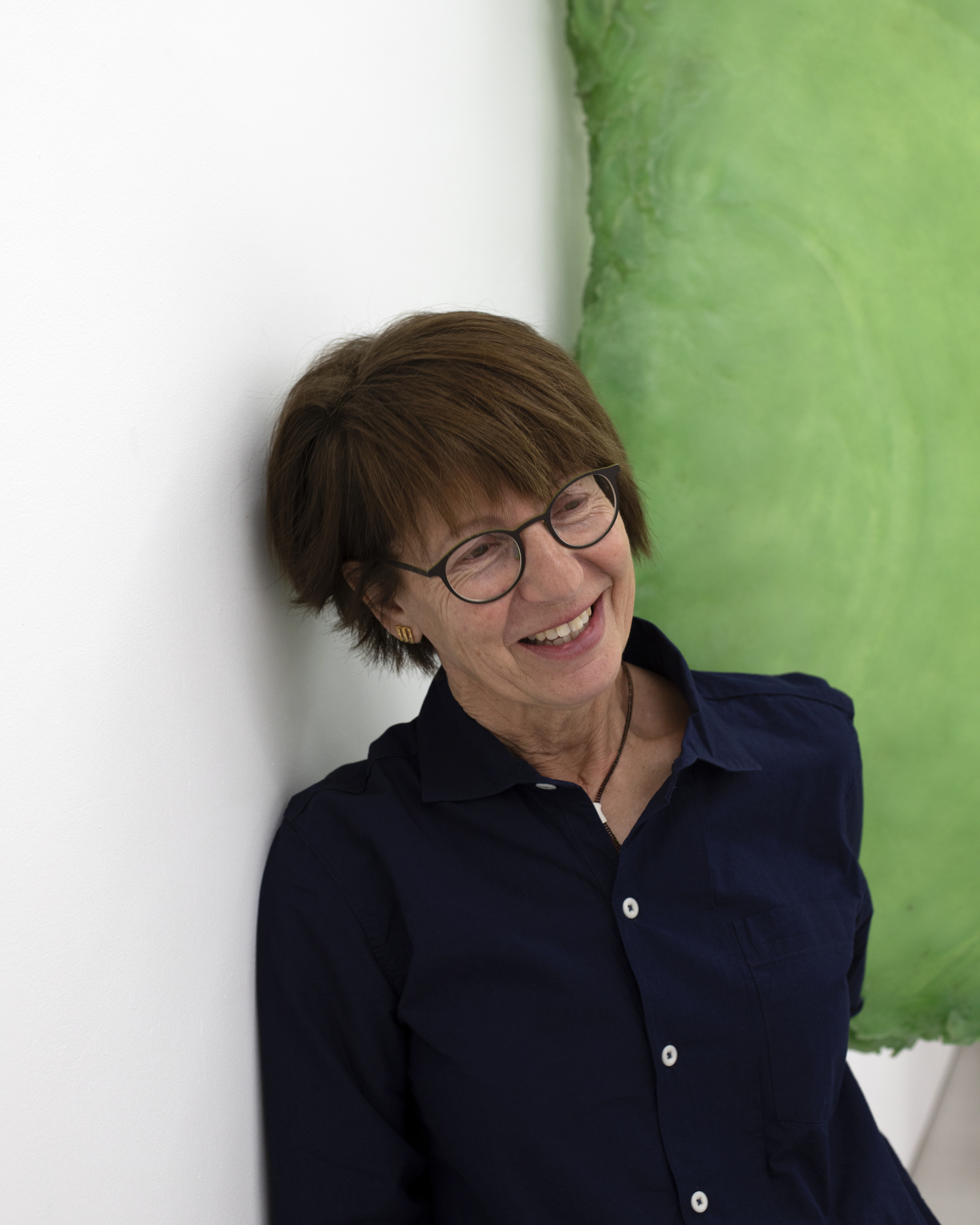
Judith Cowan (2019)

Judith Cowan (born in 1954) is a British artist who lives in London. She works in sculpture, installation, photography, and film.

Immutable Atoms, 2026, site-specific installation. Exhibited in the Biennale dello Stretto, Reggio Calabria, 2026. Photo: Stefano Anzini

== Life and work ==
From 1974 to 1977, Cowan studied sculpture at Sheffield Polytechnic and later at Chelsea School of Art and Design from 1977 to 1978. In 1978–79, she was awarded the Gulbenkian Rome Scholarship, British School at Rome.

Between 1980 and 2016, she taught in Fine Art at Goldsmith College, Chelsea School of Art and Design and Middlesex University amongst others.

Cowan was invited to participate at the 3rd Edition of the Biennale dello Stretto, 2026 in Reggio Calabria with the site-specific work Immutable Atoms where she continues to challenge conventional modes of cognition inviting viewers to actively engage with the work.

Cowan has exhibited in solo shows at Camden Art Centre (1993), Studio Stefania Miscetti (1995 and 2000), Kettle's Yard in Cambridge (1996), Museo Laboratorio di Arte Contemporanea in Rome (2005), Erica Ravenna Arte Contemporanea in Rome (2006), Finnegan’s Teeth project in London (2009) and traveled to Prague (2010). The films Angelica and The Palace of Raw Dreams were made in collaboration with the Antonio Pasqualino Museo in Palermo (2012 and 2013). Both films were exhibited at the Antonio Pasqualino Museo then Angelica travelled to the Sharjah Art Foundation (2014).

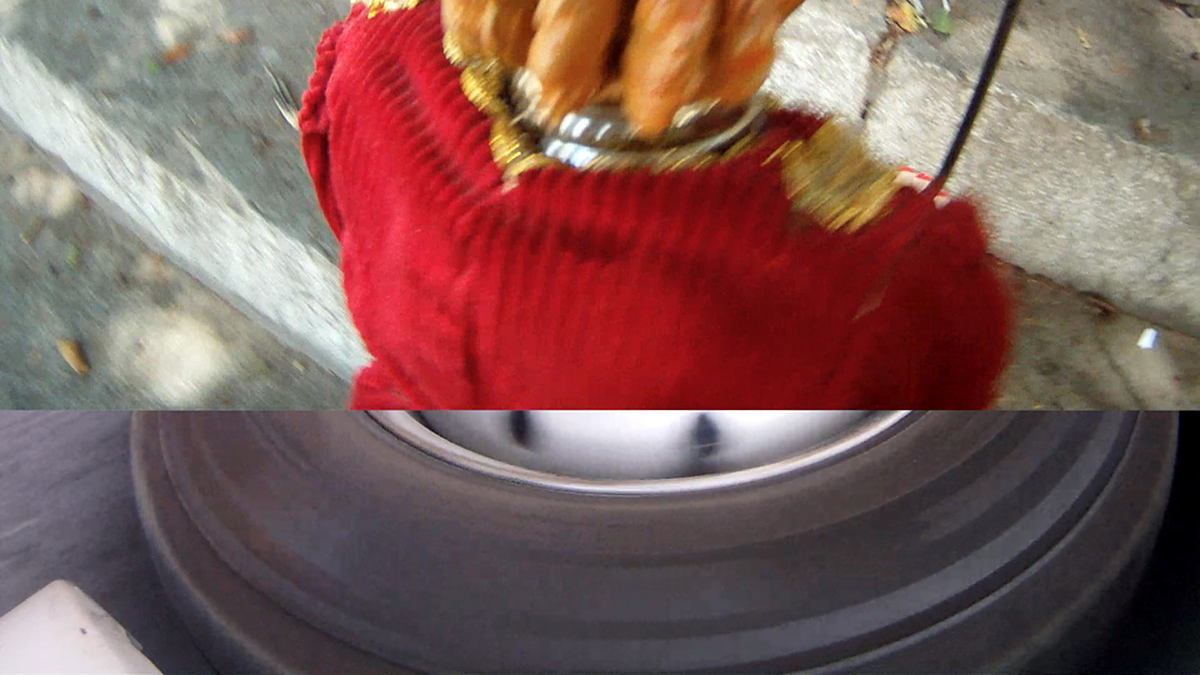
Angelica, 2013, film still. Exhibited at the Antonio Pasqualino Museum, Palermo in 2014, 2018 and at the Sharjah Art Foundation in 2018.

She received awards from the Henry Moore Foundation in 1998, 1996 and 1992; The Elephant Trust in 1993 and was a prize-winner at Rassegna Internazionale di Scultura Contemporanea, San Marino, Italy in 1979.

Her work is in the collections of The Ashmolean Museum, Oxford; Arts Council of Great Britain; the Hechinger Collection, US; Government Art Collection, London Borough of Tower Hamlets; Museo Laboratorio di Arte Contemporanea, Rome; Rugby Museum & Art Gallery and the Walker Art Gallery, Liverpool.

== Bibliography ==
- Emily LaBarge, Paola Nicita, Rosario Perricone, Angelica, London, 2013
- Finnegan’s Teeth, RGAP, Sheffield, 2009 (Artist's book)
- S. Santacatterina, S. Lux, D. Scudero, Judith Cowan: The Capacity of Things: From Life, Luxflux, Rome, 2005
- Jean Fisher, present.....passing, Angel Row Gallery, Nottingham, 1998
- Jean Fisher, Passages & Incidents, Kettle's Yard, Cambridge, 1996
- Andrew Wilson, Water Rises, Camden Arts Centre, London, 1993
