= Degory Wheare =

English historian

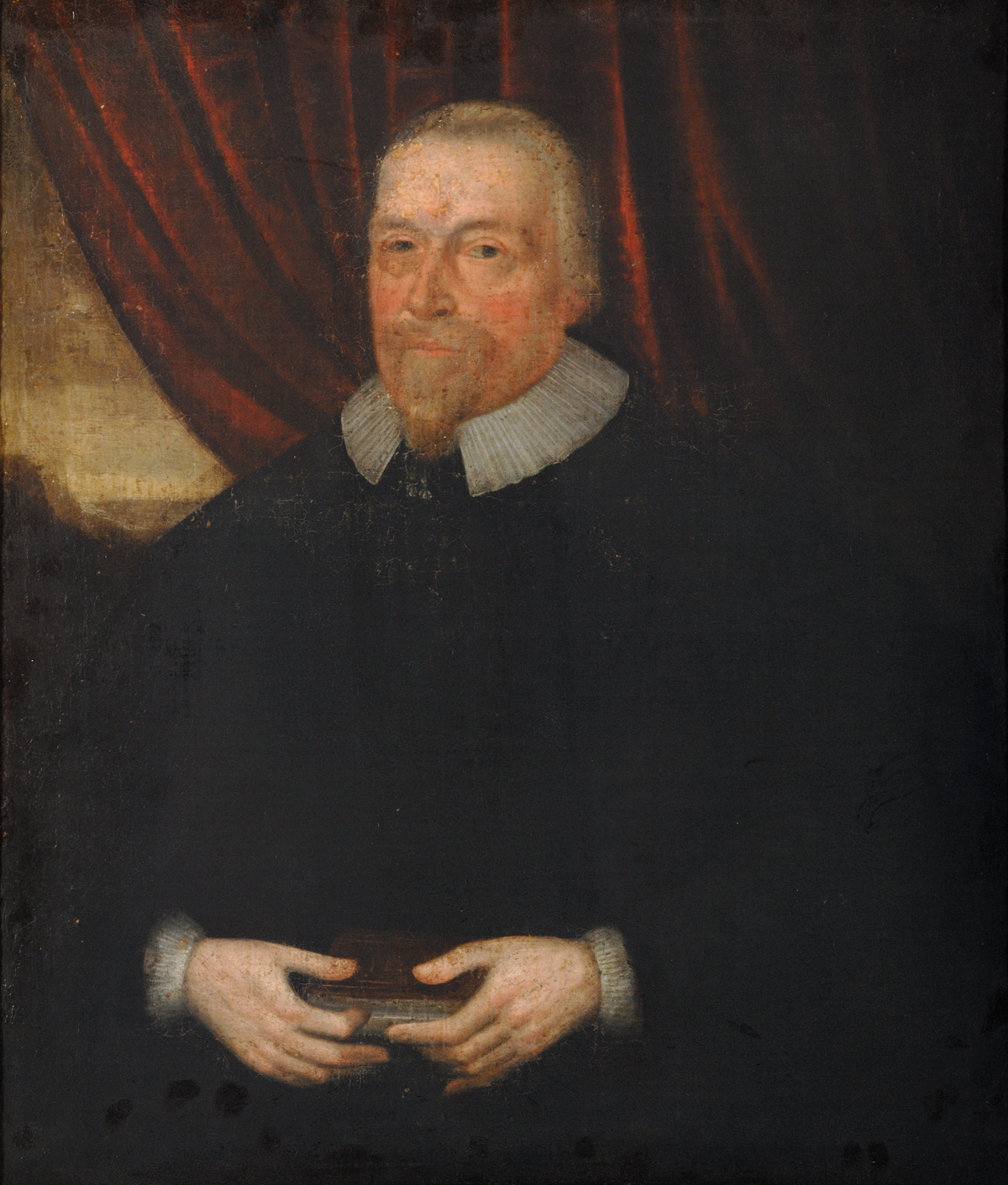
- Born: 1573; Jacobstow, Cornwall
- Died: 1 August 1647 (aged 73–74); Oxford, Oxfordshire
- Resting place: Exeter College Chapel, Oxford, Oxfordshire
- Occupation: Camden Professor of Ancient History

Degory Wheare, also spelt Digory Whear (the first name can be Latinized as Degoreus or Digoreus) (1573 – 1 August 1647) was a Cornish historian, the first Camden Professor of Ancient History in the University of Oxford.

== Life ==
He was born in Jacobstow, Cornwall, at the mansion of Berry Court. He matriculated at Broadgates Hall, Oxford, on 6 July 1593, graduated B.A. on 5 February 1597, and proceeded M.A. on 16 June 1600. He was a contemporary of Francis Rous, a lifelong friend; and he was tutor at Broadgates Hall to John Pym (matriculated 18 May 1599). Another Oxford friend was Charles Fitzgeoffrey.

Wheare was admitted on 7 July 1602 as Cornish fellow of Exeter College, Oxford, and became full fellow on 7 July 1603. He was headmaster of Abingdon School from 1605 to 1606. He resigned his fellowship on 30 April 1608. In that year he went abroad as travelling companion to Grey Brydges, 5th Baron Chandos; and on his return to England Wheare continued to live with him. He was then permitted to occupy lodgings with his wife in Gloucester Hall, Oxford, where he became a close friend of Thomas Allen.

Through the influence of Allen with William Camden, the founder of the chair, Wheare was appointed on 16 October 1622 the first professor of modern history at Oxford, and he became principal of Gloucester Hall on 4 April 1626, where he expanded the student population. Anthony Wood says that Wheare ‘was esteemed by some a learned and genteel man, and by others a Calvinist.’

Wheare died at Oxford on 1 August 1647, and was buried under the eagle in Exeter College Chapel on 3 August, a large gravestone marking the place of burial. He left a widow and several children, in poverty. Four of his sons had been educated at Oxford; Charles was an unsuccessful candidate on his father's death for the professorship of modern history.

== Works ==
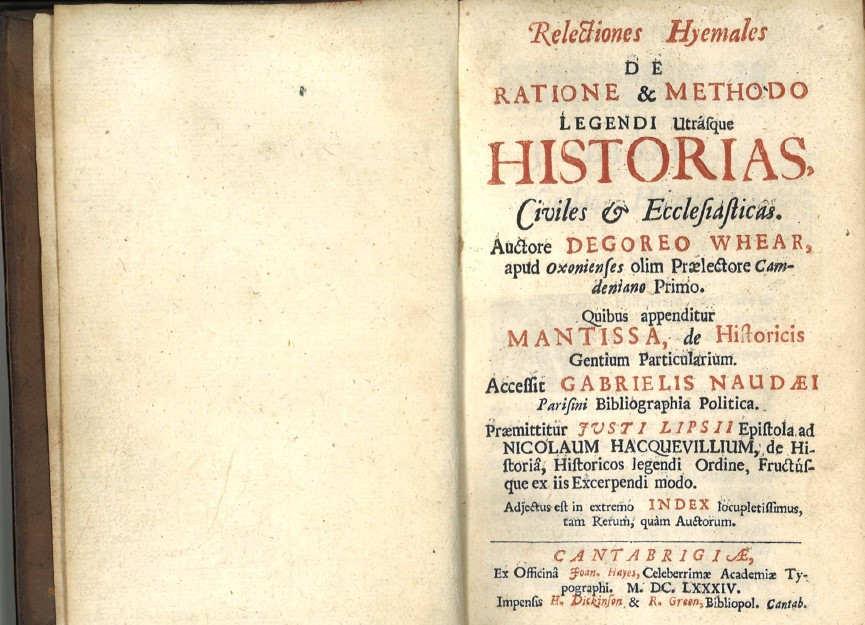
Relectiones Hyemales De Ratione Et Methodo Legendi Utrasque Historias by Degoreo Whear, 1684 edition

His most significant work was entitled De Ratione et Methodo Legendi Historias (Of the Reason for and Method of Reading Histories) published in October 1623. This was in origin his inaugural address for the new chair, in which he laid out a schema for the study of secular history, which found such a positive response that it went through many editions and expansions in the next decades. An English version was published in 1685 by Edmund Bohun, as The Method and Order for Reading both Civil and Ecclesiastical Histories.

== See also ==
- Frederick Goddard Tuckerman: Degory Wheare is referred to in a sonnet by this poet as a "forgotten sage" named Dagoraus Whear.

== Notes ==
Attribution

This article incorporates text from a publication now in the public domain: "Wheare, Degory". Dictionary of National Biography. London: Smith, Elder & Co. 1885–1900.

Academic offices
Preceded by New Creation	Camden Professor of Ancient History, Oxford University; 1622–1647	Succeeded by Robert Waryng
