= Jane Rowlandson =

British historian (1953 – 2018)

- Born: 1953
- Died: 2018 (aged 64–65)
- Occupation: Historian

Academic background
- Education: University of Oxford
- Doctoral advisor: Alan Bowman

Academic work
- Discipline: Ancient historian
- Sub-discipline: Ancient Egypt; Ptolemaic Egypt; Roman Egypt
- Institutions: University of Newcastle; University College London; Birkbeck, University of London; King's College London
- Main interests: Ancient Egypt

Jane Rowlandson (1953 – 2018) was a British ancient historian who specialised in the economic and social history of Egypt during the Greek and Roman periods. She was a lecturer in Ancient History at King's College, London for 16 years, retiring in 2005. In 1996 she published the influential book Landowners and Tenants in Roman Egypt.

== Academic career ==
Rowlandson was educated in the Girls' Division of Bolton School, an independent school in Bolton, Lancashire. In 1972, she began studying Literae Humaniores at St Hilda's College, Oxford. She began her doctoral research there, supervised by Alan Bowman, and gained her Doctor of Philosophy (DPhil) degree in 1983 after moving to The Queen's College, Oxford as a Research Fellow. Her doctoral thesis was titled "Landholding in the Oxyrhynchite nome, 30 B.C.-c. 300 A.D.".

From 1982 to 1984 she was Sir James Knott Research Fellow at Newcastle University. She held teaching posts at University College London and Birkbeck, University of London before moving to King's College London as lecturer in Ancient History in 1989. She taught at King's for 13 years, being promoted to Reader in 2003. Rowlandson suffered from rheumatoid arthritis, and she retired in 2005 because of ill health.

=== Research ===
Rowlandson's main area of research was the economic and social history of Greek and Roman Egypt. Her 1996 monograph, based on her doctoral work, is a monumental study of the documentary evidence for landownership in Roman Egypt and has been described as "indispensable" and "invaluable". The book was particularly important for demonstrating the existence of large numbers of female landowners. Building on this work, Rowlandson went on to conduct further research on the economic activities of women in Roman Egypt, publishing a number of articles as well as a sourcebook, which made the often difficult papyrological evidence readily accessible to students and general readers. In the years leading up to her death in 2018, Rowlandson remained an active researcher, working on two main projects: a study of the cultural history of Roman Egypt and a collection of sources on slavery in Egypt from Pharaonic to Arab times. The second of these was nearing completion, and may be published posthumously.

== Selected publications ==
- Rowlandson, Jane. 1995. Beyond the polis: Women and economic opportunity in early Ptolemaic Egypt. In A. Powell (ed), The Greek world. London and New York: Routledge. 301–322.
- Rowlandson, Jane. 1996. Landowners and Tenants in Roman Egypt: The social relations of agriculture in the Oxyrhynchite nome. Oxford University Press
- Rowlandson, Jane. 1998. (ed) Women and Society in Greek and Roman Egypt: A Sourcebook. Cambridge University Press.
- Rowlandson, Jane and Takahashi, Ryosuke. 2009. Brother-Sister Marriage and Inheritance Strategies in Greco-Roman Egypt. Journal of Roman Studies 99: 104–139.
- Rowlandson, Jane. 2010. Administration and law: Graeco-Roman. In A. Lloyd (ed). A companion to ancient Egypt. Vol. 1. Blackwell Companions to the Ancient World 36. Chichester, UK, and Malden, MA: Wiley-Blackwell. 237–254.
