= Margerie Venables Taylor =

British archaeologist

Margerie Venables Taylor CBE FSA
- Born: 20 January 1881
- Died: 24 December 1963 (aged 82); Oxford
- Education: Somerville College, Oxford
- Occupations: Archaeologist and historian

Margerie Venables Taylor, CBE, FSA (20 January 1881 – 24 December 1963) was an archaeologist and editor of the Journal of Roman Studies, and held posts including Secretary for the Society for the Promotion of Roman Studies. She was particularly instrumental in recording excavations in Roman Britain.

== Early life and education ==
Margerie Venables Taylor was born in 1881. She was a native of Chester in Cheshire. Her parents were Henry Taylor, a historian and antiquarian, and his wife, Agnes née Venables. She was educated at Queen's School, Chester and Somerville College, Oxford, where she took finals in Modern History in 1903 but, as a woman, at that date could not be awarded a degree. Oxford later changed its rules and women were allowed to be admitted to degrees, and Taylor was one of the first women to graduate: on 30 October 1920, she received Bachelor of Arts (BA) and Master of Arts (MA Oxon) degrees.

== Career ==
- Secretary for the Society for the Promotion of Roman Studies between 1923 and 1954, becoming vice-president in 1954 and president from 1956 to 1958.
- In 1925 she was elected a fellow of the Society of Antiquaries in London, after being nominated by Arthur Evans.
- Venables Taylor was the first woman to hold the office of vice-president of the Society of Antiquaries.
- Vice Secretary of the Society of Antiquaries in London
- Elected Honorary Research Fellow of Somerville College, Oxford in 1946
- In 1947 she became an honorary member of the Society of Antiquaries of Newcastle upon Tyne
- In 1949 she was awarded with the CBE

She wrote a large number of articles for various archaeological journals, and for many years edited the Journal of Roman Studies. She contributed material on Roman Britain to the Victoria County Histories. She edited the medieval manuscript, De laude Cestrie, an urban eulogy praising Chester.

She also excavated in North Wales with Mortimer Wheeler, who had co-signed her election proposal to the Society of Antiquaries. Venables Taylor was Honorary Secretary of the Oxford branch of the English Folk Dance Society in 1915.

== Journal of Roman Studies ==
Taylor had worked as an assistant to Francis Haverfield for several years, and following his death took up the editorship of the Journal of Roman Studies for a further four decades. Although not herself an administrator, she worked and travelled widely on behalf of the Haverfield Bequest, which was to be applied to the promotion of the study of Roman Britain.

As joint secretary of the Society of Promotion of Roman Studies and editor of the journal, she made the decision to focus resources on the journal at the cost of other projects, and to publish the annual account of excavation in Roman Britain. She also created the Congress of Classical Studies, held jointly with the Hellenic Society and the Classical Association, which became a triennial event.
