= Roger Cashmore =

Roger John Cashmore CMG FRSA (born 22 August 1944) is the chair of the United Kingdom Atomic Energy Authority. Previously he was principal of Brasenose College, Oxford, and professor of experimental physics at the University of Oxford. His interests include the origin of the masses of particles and the Higgs boson.

== Education ==
Cashmore was educated at Dudley Boys Grammar School, St John's College, Cambridge (BA 1965, MA), Balliol College, Oxford, and University College, Oxford (DPhil 1969, Weir Junior Research Fellow, 1851 Research Fellow). His doctoral thesis was entitled A study of inelastic pion-proton interactions in the range 600–800 MeV/c.

== Academic career ==
He was a research associate at Stanford Linear Accelerator Center 1969–74. Returning to Oxford he was a research officer (1974–78), teaching lecturer at Christ Church (1976–78), senior research fellow at Merton (1977–79), and fellow and tutor at Balliol and university lecturer in physics (1979–90). He was appointed reader in experimental physics in 1990 and professor of experimental physics in 1991. He was also head of particle and nuclear physics 1991–96 and chair of the Department of Physics 1997–99. He was appointed principal of Brasenose from 2002 onwards. Cashmore also served as director of research and deputy director general at Organisation européenne pour la recherche nucléaire (CERN) from 1999 to 2004. During his term, several agreements took place with China's and Pakistan's to be of the most important. In 2002 he became co-chairman of the CERN-JINR joint scientific committee after Jim Allaby's retirement.

He was visiting professor at the Vrije Universiteit Brussel in 1982, Science and Engineering Research Council Senior Research Fellow 1982–87, a guest scientist at Fermi National Accelerator Laboratory 1986–87, and held an Alexander von Humboldt Foundation Research Award 1995/96.

HM The Queen appointed Roger Cashmore Companion of the Most Distinguished Order of St Michael and St George for services to international co-operation in particle physics in the New Year Honours List 2004. He was awarded the C.V. Boys Prize in 1983. He was elected a Fellow of the Institute of Physics in 1985, a member of Academia Europa in 1992, a Fellow of the Royal Society of Arts in 1996, and a Fellow of the Royal Society in 1998. He is a member of the advisory council for the Campaign for Science and Engineering.

== Controversy ==
Cashmore's final years at Oxford were marked by allegations of improper claims for travel expenses, following the publication in May 2010 of a leaked report from an investigation committee at Brasenose College. Cashmore denied any misuse of expenses, claiming that the report contained a number of inaccuracies. During October 2010 Brasenose College announced that Cashmore would be taking research leave. The college denied that there was any link between this decision and the previous allegations concerning expenses, but a second leaked document indicated that the governing body of the college had passed a motion of no confidence in Cashmore, who subsequently applied for the post of chairman of the United Kingdom Atomic Energy Authority. A spokesperson for Brasenose College said "The members of the standing Sub-Committee were dismayed that their report to the Governing Body had been leaked to the press." The college also commented that "The [expenses] report did not conclude that the Principal had submitted any claims for travel expenses that were not genuine. The members of the Sub-Committee are confident that there is no question of impropriety on his part."

On 9 December 2010 Brasenose's acting principal, Alan Bowman, announced Cashmore's retirement from his role as principal at the end of the 2010–2011 academic year "to focus on his role as Chairman of the United Kingdom Atomic Energy Authority and to return to his research interests at CERN and the LHC (Large Hadron Collider), at what is a particularly exciting time for particle physics." This announcement led to the republication of previous allegations.

== Publications ==
- Roger Cashmore and Gerald Myatt, eds, Perkins conference: meeting in honour of the retirement of Professor D H Perkins, Oxford, 11–13 July 1993 (Singapore; London: World Scientific, 1994)

== Sources and further information ==
- University of Oxford Annual Review 2002/03
- University of Oxford Annual Review 2003/04
- Roger Cashmore's personal website
- Debrett's People of Today (12th edn, London: Debrett's Peerage, 1999), p. 332
- Scientific publications of Roger Cashmore on INSPIRE-HEP

Academic offices
Preceded by Lord Windlesham	Principal of Brasenose College, Oxford; 2002–2011	Succeeded by Alan Bowman
