= Roy Gibson (classicist) =

British classical scholar

- Board member of: The Journal of Roman Studies

Academic background
- Education: Sidney Sussex College, Cambridge

Academic work
- Discipline: Classics
- Sub-discipline: Latin Literature
- Institutions: University of Manchester; Durham University

Roy Gibson is a British Classicist and Professor at Durham University. Specialising in Latin Literature, he has worked extensively on the imperial period, with a focus on Ovid and Pliny the Younger. Gibson is also the joint-chair of the Classical Association and serves on the editorial board of the Journal of Roman Studies.

== Career ==
Gibson studied Classics at Sidney Sussex College, Cambridge, leading to a BA (1987) and later a PhD (1993). He then went on to become a Research Fellow at the same college. From 1994, he worked at the University of Manchester and was promoted to a professorship in 2004. In 2018, Gibson was appointed Professor of Latin at Durham University.

== Selected publications ==
- The Classical Commentary: Histories, Practices, Theory, edited with C. S. Kraus, Brill, 2002
- Ovid, Ars Amatoria, Book 3, Cambridge University Press, 2003
- The Art of Love. Bimillennial Essays on Ovid's "Ars Amatoria" and "Remedia Amoris", edited with S. Green and A. Sharrock, Oxford University Press, 2006
- Excess and Restraint: Propertius, Horace, and Ovid’s Ars Amatoria, Institute of Classical Studies, 2007
- Pliny the Elder: Themes and Contexts, edited with R. Morello, Brill, 2011
- Reading The Letters of Pliny the Younger: An Introduction, with Ruth Morello, Cambridge University Press, 2012
