= Robert Waring =

Robert Waring (1614–1658) was an English academic, cleric and author.

== Life ==
His father was Edmund Waring and his mother the daughter of Richard Broughton, of Owlbury in the parish of Bishops Castle in Shropshire, and niece of Hugh Broughton. He was educated at Westminster School; he matriculated at Christ Church, Oxford on 24 February 1632, graduating B.A. on 20 June 1634 and M.A. on 26 April 1637.

During the First English Civil War Waring bore arms for the king at Oxford. He was elected proctor on 29 April 1647 and Camden professor of ancient history on 2 August that year. A protest against the election was made by Charles Wheare, son of the previous professor Degory Wheare, who had been given the place by the parliamentary visitors. According to the statutes Waring was not eligible, being in holy orders. He took an active part in resisting the proceedings of the visitors. Disregarding their order for his removal from his post of proctor, he was pronounced by them guilty of contempt of the authority of parliament on 14 December 1647. it John Selden interceded, and Waring avoided banishment from the university.

Waring was then summoned to London on 6 April 1648, was ordered into custody, but escaped again to Oxford. On 14 September of that year he was deprived of his proctorship, professorship, and student's place. He retired to Apley in Shropshire, the seat of Sir William Whitmore, with whom he subsequently visited France.

Waring died unmarried in Lincoln's Inn Fields on 10 May 1658, and was buried at St. Michael's, College Hill. His will was proved on 20 May 1658 by his sister and sole executrix, Anne Staunton.

== Works ==
Waring published:

- A publike Conference betwixt the six Presbyterian Ministers and some Independent Commanders at Oxford, 12 Nov. 1646 (anon.) 1646.
- An Account of Mr. Pryn's Refutation of the University of Oxford's Plea, Oxford, 1648.
- Amoris Effigies (anon.), London, 1649, 1664, 1668, 1671. In 1680 appeared a loose English translation, by a Robert Nightingale, which deviated in many points from the Latin original. John Norris, under the pseudonym Phil-iconerus, published a fresh translation, London, 1682; 2nd edit., 1701; 4th edit., 1744. In his introduction, Norris wrote of Waring's "sweetness of fancy, neatness of style, and lusciousness of hidden sense".

Waring also wrote Latin verses, including in Jonsonus Virbius (1639), reprinted in the 1668 and subsequent editions of the Amoris Effigies, under the title of Carmen Lapidorium.

== Notes ==
Attribution

This article incorporates text from a publication now in the public domain: Lee, Sidney, ed. (1899). "Waring, Robert". Dictionary of National Biography. Vol. 59. London: Smith, Elder & Co.
