= John Warneford =

Reverend John Warneford MA, BD (1720 – 20 November 1773) was an English clergyman and scholar.

He was born in Miserden, Gloucestershire, the eldest son of Reverend William Warneford, Senior Lecturer of St Michael, Cornhill, and Susannah Paynter (great granddaughter of Edward Reynolds, bishop of Norwich). A year before his birth, his father, then an eighteen-year-old scholar at New College, Oxford, caused a sensation by eloping with Susannah, the 34-year-old daughter of William Paynter, Vice-Chancellor of the University of Oxford.

John Warneford attended school at Winchester, and matriculated at Corpus Christi College, Oxford on 8 July 1735, aged 14. He graduated MA in 1742/3 and Bachelor of Divinity in 1752. From 1743 to 1748 he was curate to his father at All Hallows Bread Street, London but afterwards returned to Oxford. In June 1761 he was unanimously elected Camden Professor of Ancient History, Oxford, and remained so until his death in 1773. For some of this period he was also rector of Bassingham, Lincolnshire and at the time of his death was curate at Helmdon, Northamptonshire, where there is a memorial tablet commemorating him.

He married Lucy Southby of South Marston on 7 December 1761 and they had two daughters. After his death, two volumes of his sermons were published in 1776, with a long subscription list.

He is buried at Helmdon.
