= Peregrine Horden =

Professor of medieval history

John Nicholas Peregrine Horden FRHistS FSA (born 1955) is a British medieval historian and academic, specialising in medieval medicine and the history of the Mediterranean.

== Academic career ==
From 1977 to 1984, Horden was a prize fellow at All Souls College, Oxford. Between 1995 and 2007, he was a lecturer at Royal Holloway, University of London, rising to the rank of reader. In 2007 or 2008, he was appointed Professor of Medieval History. He retired from Royal Holloway, and returned to All Soul where he served as official fellow and college librarian from 2021 to 2026. He holds the title of emeritus professor at Royal Holloway.

Horden's research is in the area of Mediterranean cities and medicine in the Middle Ages. He is a Fellow of All Souls College, Oxford.

The publication of his book The Corrupting Sea: A Study of Mediterranean History (co-written with Nicholas Purcell) was hailed as a 'notable intellectual event'. The book's main thesis is that the Mediterranean is a region made up of micro-regions. The book argues that the Mediterranean ought to be seen in terms of the ecological lines of force linking countless small regions and micro-economies together rather than in terms of a few famous metropoleis. Horden and Purcell stress the longues durées and insist that the different themes of history, i.e. politics, culture, economy, ideas and institutions must be studied in close association.

== Honours ==
On 11 March 2004, Horden was elected a Fellow of the Society of Antiquaries of London (FSA).

== Selected publications ==
- The Boundless Sea: Writing Mediterranean History (with Nicholas Purcell; Abingdon and New York: Routledge, 2019)
- Companion to Mediterranean History (co-editor with Sharon Kinoshita; Oxford: Wiley-Blackwell, 2014)
- The Body in Balance: Humoral Medicines in Practice Horden, P. (ed.) & Hsu, E. (ed.) 2013, Berghahn.
- Hospitals and Healing from Antiquity to the Later Middle Ages Horden, P. 2008 Aldershot: Ashgate.
- All Souls under the Ancien Régime: Politics, Learning and the Arts, c.1600–1850 Horden, P. (ed.) & Green, S. J. D. (ed.) 2007 Oxford: Oxford University Press.
- Freedom of Movement in the Middle Ages, Proceedings of the Twentieth Harlaxton Symposium Horden, P. (ed.) 2007 Donington: Shaun Tyas.
- The Impact of Hospitals 300-2000 Horden, P. (ed.), Henderson, J. (ed.) & Pastore, A. (ed.) 2007, Oxford: Peter Lang.
- The Corrupting Sea: A Study of Mediterranean History (with Nicholas Purcell; Oxford: Blackwell Publishing, 2000)
- Music as Medicine: The History of Music Therapy since Antiquity (editor; Aldershot: Ashgate Publishing, 2000)
- The Locus of Care: Families, Communities, Institutions, and the Provision of Welfare since Antiquity (co-editor with Richard Smith; London: Routledge, 1998)
- Freud and the Humanities (London: Duckworth Books, 1985)
