= Nicholas Purcell (classicist) =

Academic at Oxford University

Nicholas Purcell FBA
- Title: Camden Professor of Ancient History (2011–2023)

Academic background
- Education: Worcester College, Oxford; All Souls College, Oxford

Academic work
- Discipline: Ancient history
- Sub-discipline: Ancient Rome; History of the Mediterranean region
- Institutions: All Souls College, Oxford; Faculty of Classics, University of Oxford; St John's College, Oxford; Brasenose College, Oxford
- Notable works: The Corrupting Sea: A Study of Mediterranean History (2000)

Nicholas Purcell FBA is a British classicist and academic. He was Camden Professor of Ancient History and a fellow of Brasenose College, Oxford from 2011 to 2023. Before holding this post he was University Lecturer in Ancient History at the University of Oxford and a Tutorial Fellow at St John's College, Oxford.

== Early life and education ==
From 1974 to 1977, Purcell was an undergraduate at Worcester College, Oxford, graduating with a Bachelor of Arts (BA) degree. During his time at Worcester College he was a student of Peter Brunt. He was subsequently a prize-fellow at All Souls College, Oxford, until 1979. He does not have a doctorate.

== Academic career ==
From 1979 until October 2011, he was a tutorial fellow at St John's College, Oxford, succeeding Nicholas Sherwin-White. He was elected as a Fellow of the British Academy (FBA) in 2007. Upon becoming Camden Professor of Ancient History in October 2011, he was elected a fellow of Brasenose College, Oxford.

=== Visiting appointments and lectures ===
In 1998 Purcell gave the Jerome lectures at the University of Michigan and in 2008 the Rostovtzeff lectures at Yale University. In 2010 he gave the Gray Lectures at the University of Cambridge. In 2012 Purcell became the 98th Sather Professor of Classical Literature at the University of California, Berkeley lecturing on 'Venal Histories: The Character, Limits, and Historical Importance of Buying and Selling in the Ancient World'. In 2012 he also gave the Charles Alexander Robinson, Jr. Memorial Lecture at Brown University entitled 'Roman Diasporas & Texture of Empire.' Purcell has also held the Chaire d'excellence Pierre de Fermat at the University of Toulouse II - Le Mirail.

=== Research ===
Purcell has research interests in the social, economic and cultural history of Rome and the City of Rome as well as the Mediterranean Sea and its history.

Purcell is known especially for his 'ecological view' of ancient history as well as his expertise in ancient Mediterranean history. The publication of his book The Corrupting Sea: A Study of Mediterranean History (co-written with Peregrine Horden) was hailed as a 'notable intellectual event'. The book's main thesis is that the Mediterranean is a region made up of micro-regions. The book argues that the Mediterranean ought to be seen in terms of the ecological lines of force linking countless small regions and micro-economies together rather than in terms of a few famous metropoleis. Purcell stresses the longue durée and insists that the different themes of history, i.e. politics, culture, economy, ideas and institutions must be studied in close association. Purcell is currently concerned with expanding this work and with situating the Mediterranean in even larger contexts so as to show how ancient history can be used to answer global historical questions.

== Selected bibliography ==
- Horden, Peregrine; Purcell, Nicholas (2000), The Corrupting Sea: a Study of Mediterranean History, Blackwell
- Purcell, Nicholas (2003). "The way we used to eat: diet, community and history at Rome". American Journal of Philology. 124 (3): 329–358. doi:10.1353/ajp.2003.0051. PMID 21966721. S2CID 28712116.
- Purcell, Nicholas (2003). "Becoming historical: the Roman case". In David Braund; Christopher Gill (eds.). Myth, History and Culture in Republican Rome: Studies in Honour of T.P. Wiseman. University of Exeter Press.
- Purcell, Nicholas (2005), "Romans in the Roman world", in K. Galinsky (ed.), The Cambridge Companion to the Age of Augustus, Cambridge University Press
- Purcell, Nicholas; Horden, Peregrine (2006). "The Mediterranean and "the New Thalassology"". The American Historical Review.
- Purcell, Nicholas (2007), "The horti of Rome and the landscape of property", Res bene gestae: ricerche di storia urbana su Roma antica in onore di Eva Margareta Steinby
- Purcell, Nicholas (2012), "'Romans, Play On!' Rome, city of the Games", The Blackwell Companion to the City of Rome, Blackwell

Academic offices
Preceded by Alan Bowman	Camden Professor of Ancient History; University of Oxford; 2011–2023	Succeeded by Valentina Arena
