= J. P. V. D. Balsdon =

British academic (1901–1977)

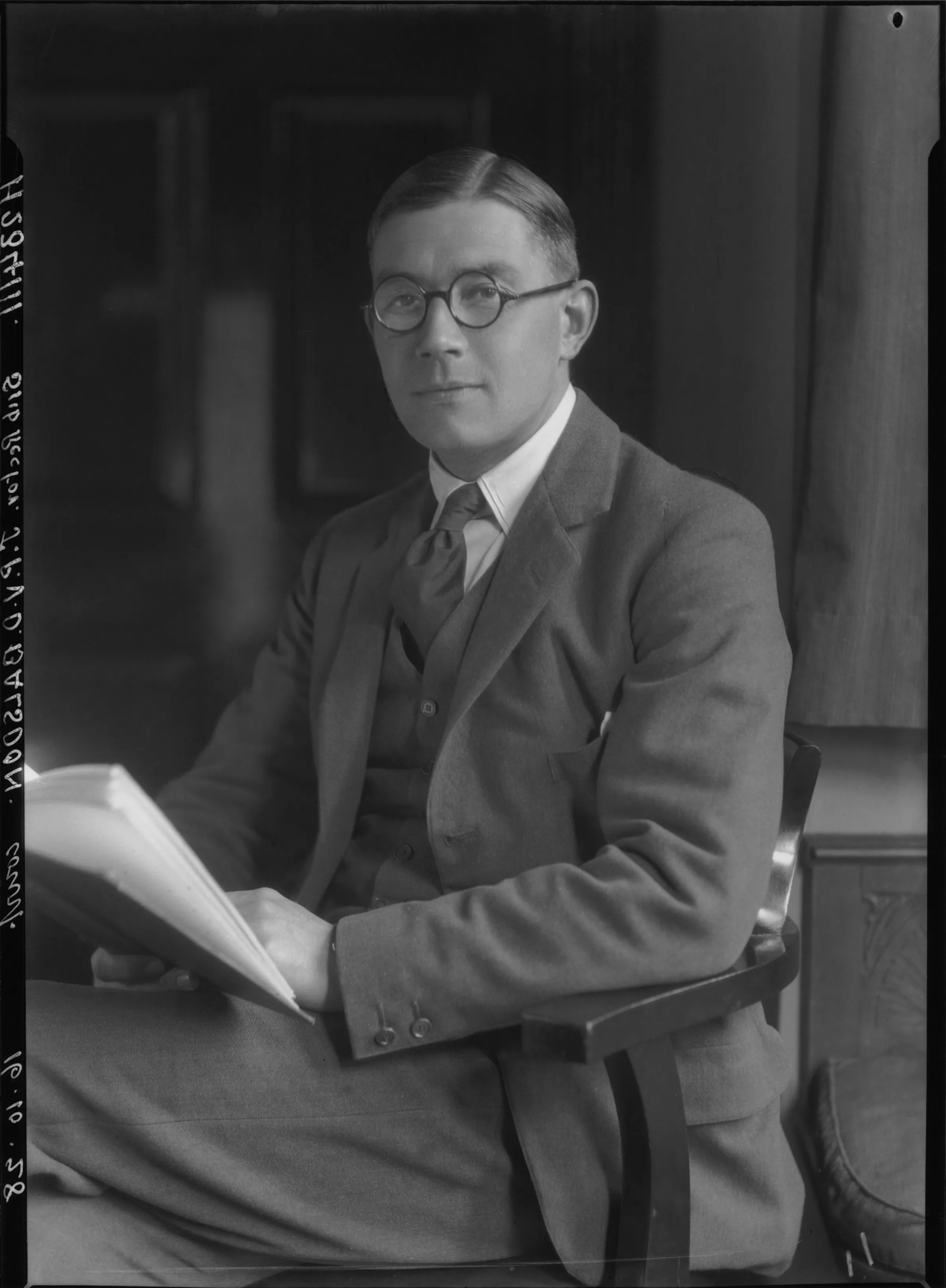
Balsdon in 1928

John Percy Vyvian Dacre Balsdon FBA (4 November 1901 – 18 September 1977), known as J. P. V. D. Balsdon in his academic work and otherwise as Dacre Balsdon, was an English ancient historian and writer. He was a Fellow of Exeter College, Oxford, from 1927 to 1969, and president of the Society for the Promotion of Roman Studies from 1968 to 1971.

== Early life ==
Balsdon was born on 4 November 1901 in Bideford, Devon. He was educated at Exeter School, Exeter. He studied classics at Exeter College, Oxford. In 1922, he was awarded first class honours in Mods, and in 1924 he was also awarded first class honours in Greats.

== Academic career ==
Balsdon began his academic career as a teacher at Sedbergh School, then an all boys public boarding school. His first university post was as a Fellow of Keble College, Oxford. From 1927, he was a Fellow of Exeter College, Oxford, where he taught Ancient History. His research was primarily in Roman History. In 1940, he was elected Junior Proctor of Oxford University; serving from March 1940 to March 1941. In 1956, he was a candidate for the Rectorship of Exeter College, but lost out to Kenneth Wheare. He served as president of the Society for the Promotion of Roman Studies from 1968 to 1971. He retired from full-time academia in 1969. The same year he was elected an emeritus Fellow of Exeter College.

He also wrote novels using the name Dacre Balsdon; his academic works gave his name as J. P. V. D. Balsdon.

He was elected Fellow of the British Academy (FBA) in 1967.

== Bibliography ==
As J. P. V. D. Balsdon:

- 'Walter de Stapeldon and the Founding of Exeter College, Oxford" Devon & Cornwall Notes and Queries Volume XVII - Part IV October 1932
- The Emperor Gaius (Caligula) (1934)
- Roman Women: Their History and Habits (1962)
- Julius Caesar and Rome (1967)
- The Romans (editor) (1965)
- Life and Leisure in Ancient Rome (1969)
- Rome: the Story of an Empire (1970)
- The Historical Background (1974)
- Social Life in the Early Empire (1974)
- Romans and Aliens (1980)

As Dacre Balsdon:

- Freshman's Folly: An Oxford Comedy (1952)
- Oxford Life (1957)
- The Day They Burned Miss Termag (1961)
- Oxford Now and Then (1970)
