= Alan Bowman (classicist) =

British classicist and academic (born 1944)

Alan Bowman FBA
- Born: Alan Keir Bowman; 23 May 1944 (age 82); Manchester, England

Academic background
- Education: The Queen's College, Oxford; University of Toronto

Academic work
- Discipline: Classics
- Sub-discipline: Ancient history; Ancient Rome; Ptolemaic Egypt; Roman Egypt; papyrology
- Institutions: Rutgers University; University of Manchester; Christ Church, Oxford; Faculty of Classics, University of Oxford; Brasenose College, Oxford
- Doctoral students: Jane Rowlandson

Alan Keir Bowman, FBA (born 23 May 1944) is a British classicist and academic. He was Camden Professor of Ancient History at the University of Oxford from 2002 to 2010, and Principal of Brasenose College, Oxford, from 2011 to 2015.

== Early life and education ==
Bowman was born on 23 May 1944 in Manchester, United Kingdom. He was educated at Manchester Grammar School, then an all-boys direct grant grammar school in Manchester. He studied at The Queen's College, Oxford, graduating with a Bachelor of Arts (BA) degree: as per tradition, his BA was promoted to a Master of Arts (MA Oxon) degree. He then studied at the University of Toronto, graduating with a Master of Arts (MA) degree. He remained at Toronto to undertake a Doctor of Philosophy (PhD) degree which he completed in 1969.

== Academic career ==
After holding academic positions at Rutgers University and the University of Manchester he was elected as University Lecturer in Ancient History at Oxford University and Official Student of Christ Church, Oxford. He was Senior Censor at Christ Church from 1988 to 1990.

In 1995 Bowman became founding Director of the Centre for the Study of Ancient Documents at Oxford. In 2002 he became Camden Professor of Ancient History and Fellow of Brasenose College.

In 1996, Bowman co-edited volume 10 of the Cambridge Ancient History second edition series, entitled The Augustan Empire, 43 BC - AD 69. As well as co-editing the volume, he also contributed the chapter on 'Provincial Administration and Taxation'. His fellow editors were Andrew Lintott, also of Oxford, and Edward Champlin, of Princeton University.

In 1994, Bowman was elected a Fellow of the British Academy (FBA), the United Kingdom's national academy for the humanities and social sciences.

== Selected works ==
- Bowman, Alan K.; Thomas, J. D. (1983). The Roman writing tablets from Vindolanda. Britannia Monograph Series. Vol. 4. London: British Museum Press. ISBN 978-0714113739.
- Bowman, Alan K. (1986). Egypt after the Pharaohs: 332 BC - AD 642, from Alexander to the Arab conquest (1st ed.). London: British Museum Publications. ISBN 978-0714109428.
- Bowman, Alan K.; Woolf, Greg, eds. (1996). Literacy and power in the ancient world. Cambridge: Cambridge University Press. ISBN 978-0521587365.
- Bowman, Alan K.; Brady, Michael, eds. (2005). Images and artefacts of the ancient world. Oxford: Oxford University Press for The British Academy. ISBN 978-0197262962.

Academic offices
Preceded by Fergus Millar	Camden Professor of Ancient History, Oxford University; 2002-2010	Succeeded by Nicholas Purcell
Preceded by Roger Cashmore	Principal of Brasenose College, Oxford; 2011-2015	Succeeded by John Bowers
