= Hugh Last =

Camden Professor of Ancient History at the University of Oxford (1894-1957)

Hugh Macilwain Last (3 December 1894 – 25 October 1957) was Camden Professor of Ancient History at the University of Oxford and Principal of Brasenose College, Oxford.

== Early life ==
Last was born in London on 3 December 1894; his father was William Last, director of the Science Museum. He was educated at St Paul's School, London and then Lincoln College, Oxford. Starting late at university because of health problems, he obtained a first-class degree in literae humaniores (classics) in 1918.

== Academic career ==
Last was appointed as a Fellow of St John's College, Oxford in 1919. His interest in the history of Ancient Rome had been sparked at school by the classical historian T. Rice Holmes, who taught at St Paul's, and continued at Lincoln under William Warde Fowler. His interests also broadened into related spheres such as ancient Oriental history. In 1927, he was appointed as a university lecturer in Roman history, and became Camden Professor of Ancient History in 1936, a post that carried with it a fellowship at Brasenose College. During the Second World War he worked at the British codebreaking centre at Bletchley Park, and in 1948 became the Principal of Brasenose, despite his health and the college's poor financial position.

He was on the governing body of Abingdon School from 1947-1950.

== Later life ==
He retired because his health difficulties in 1956. He died, unmarried, on 25 October 1957.
