= Temple of Concord =

Temple in the Roman Forum

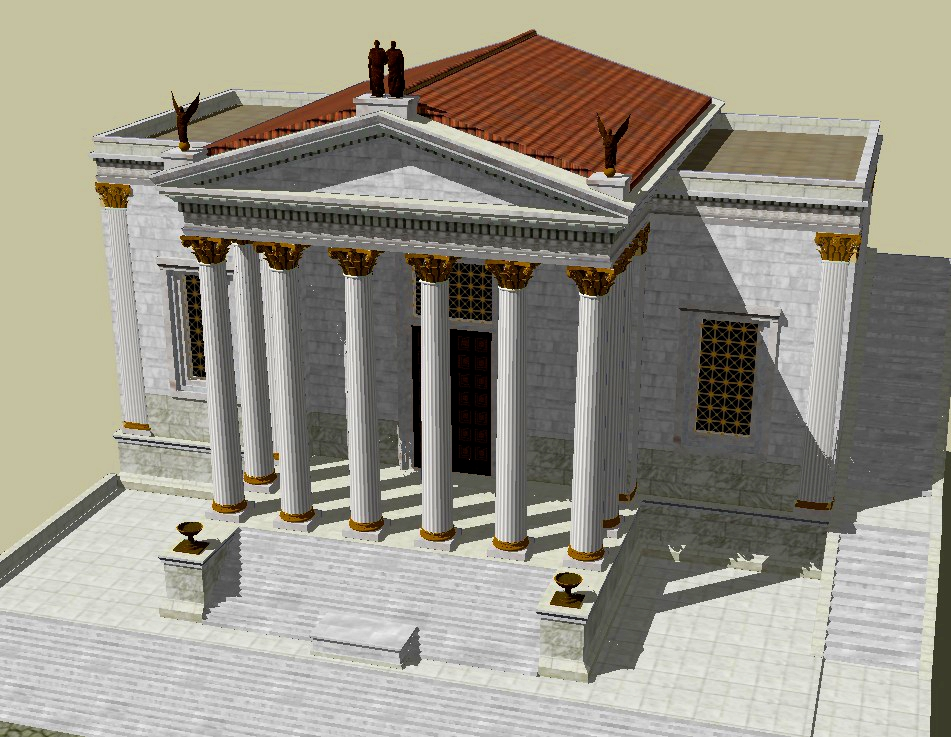

- Location within Rome
- 41.89293°N 12.484245°E
- Type: Roman Temple
- Location: Regio VIII Forum Romanum

History
- Built: 4th Century BC
- Built by: Multiple; Camillus by Legend, Lucius Manlius by Archeological Record

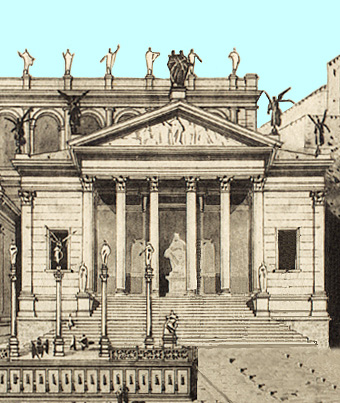
Artist's rendering of the Temple of Concord (1892)

The Temple of Concord, or Temple of Concordia, (Latin: Aedes Concordiae) in Rome refers to a series of temples dedicated to the Roman goddess Concordia, and erected at the western end of the Roman Forum. The Romans believed that the earliest temple was built by Marcus Furius Camillus in 367 BC, but archeological evidence indicates the first shrine to Concordia on the site was constructed in 218 BC by Lucius Manlius Vulso. The temple was rebuilt in 121 BC by Lucius Opimius, following the killing of the Gaius Gracchus and his supporters, and again by the future emperor Tiberius between 7 BC and AD 10.

== History ==
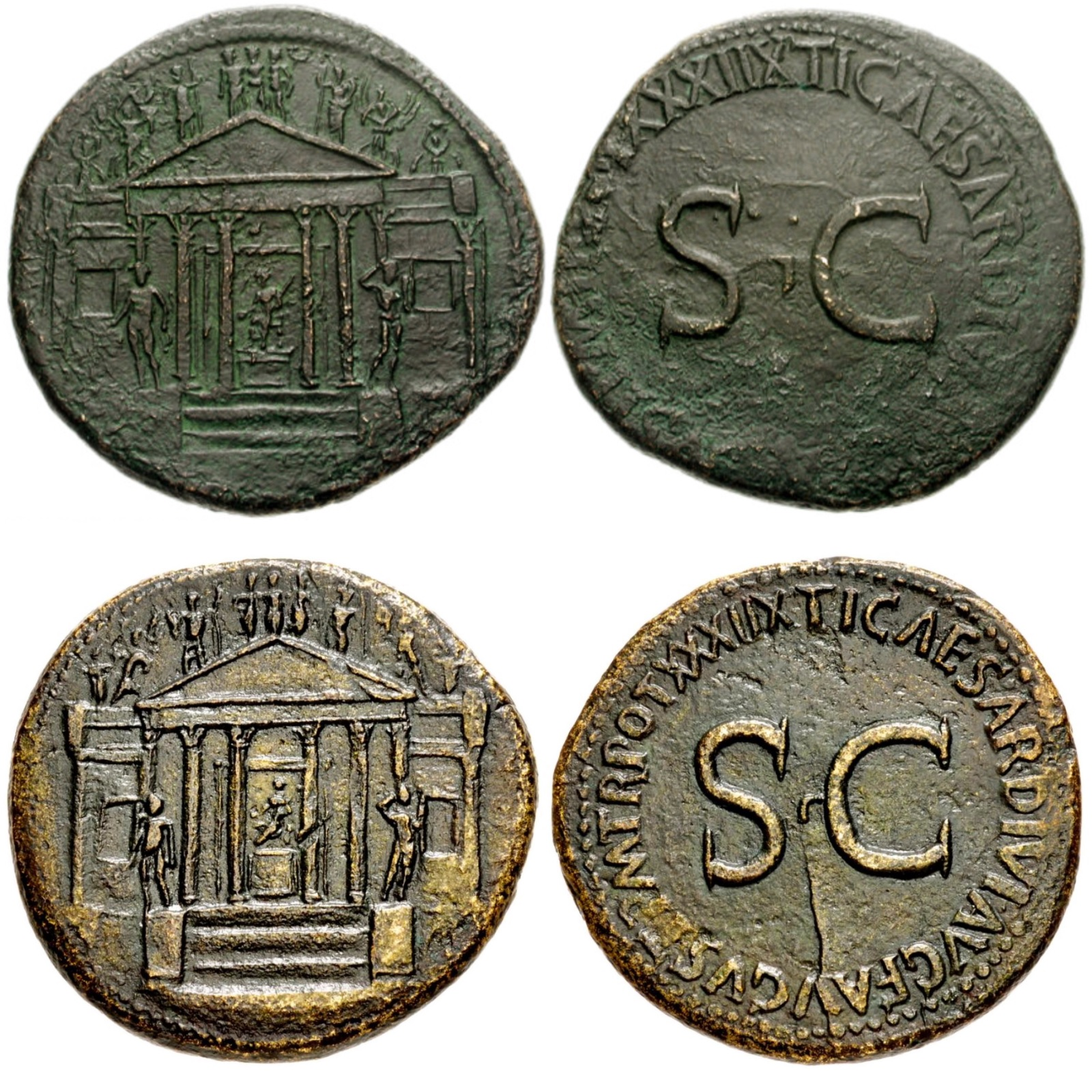
Two examples of Sestertius celebrating Tiberius restoration of the temple of Concord (minted at Rome, AD 36–37). The coins show the temple with a statue of Concordia seated inside, statues of Mercury and Hercules in front, and more statues of deities, victories, and trophies on the roof.

According to Ovid and Plutarch, the first temple to Concordia was built on the site by Marcus Furius Camillus in 367 BC. The construction was to commemorate the passing of the Lex Licinia Sextia, the law opening the consulship to the Plebeian class. The office of Consul had previously been confined to the Patricians. Camillus is said to have been named Dictator to defend against an invasion of Gauls, backing the Lex Licinia Sextia as a means of resolving the ensuing crisis, and vowing the construction of the temple as a symbol of unity and reconciliation. Modern scholarship doubts much of the story of Camillus, but it was largely accepted as fact in the Roman world.

Camillus' story is not mentioned by Livy, who instead describes the dedication of the Temple of Concord in the Vulcanal, a precinct sacred to Vulcan on the western end of the forum, by Gnaeus Flavius in 304 BC. Flavius' identity in ancient sources is unclear; Livy makes the claim that he was an aedile, while Cicero and Pliny claim he was a scribe. In either case, he was reportedly the son of a freed slave, and therefore of low social standing. The nature of the conflicting identities of Flavius has caused some to call this story into question.

A third Temple of Concord was begun in 217 BC, early in the Second Punic War. This temple was built by the duumviri Marcus Pupius and Caeso Quinctius Flamininus, fulfilling a sacred vow made by the praetor Lucius Manlius Vulso following his victory over the Gauls in 218 BC. The reason why Manlius vowed a temple to Concordia specifically is not immediately apparent, but Livy alludes to a mutiny that had occurred among the praetor's men. The temple was completed and dedicated the following year by the duumviri Marcus and Gaius Atilius, and is the first temple attested in the archaeological record.

The murder of Gaius Gracchus in 121 BC marked a low point in the relationship between the Roman aristocracy and the popular party. His death was immediately followed by further killings, this time of three thousand of Gracchus' supporters. Attempting to quell the subsequent unrest, Lucius Opimius, at the Senate's behest, ordered a fourth reconstruction of the Temple of Concord. The plebeians regarded this as an insincere attempt to clothe his actions in a symbolic act of reconciliation. The temple became a political battleground, with enraged plebeians using graffiti to place their own interpretations on the temple. In one incident, the words "a work of mad discord produces a temple of Concord" were carved under the temple's main inscription.

From this period, the temple was frequently used as a meeting place for both the Senate and the Arval Brethren. Two important Senate meetings, including one in which Cicero delivered his Fourth Catilinarian speech and another in which Sejanus was condemned to death, took place in the Temple of Concord.

A statue of Victoria placed on the roof of the temple was struck by lightning in 211 BC, and prodigies were reported in the Concordiae, the neighborhood of the temple, in 183 and 181. Little else is heard of the temple until 7 BC, when the future emperor Tiberius undertook another restoration, which lasted until AD 10, when the structure was rededicated on 16 January as the Aedes Concordiae Augustae, the Temple of Concordia of Augustus.

This new temple served as a museum for a number of works of art, many of which are described by Pliny. The fine collection consisted primarily of Greek art including a statue of Hestia, several group bronzes, and panel paintings by famous Greek painters including Zeuxis, Nikias and Theoros.

The temple is occasionally mentioned during the imperial period, and it could have been the meeting place of the Senate after the death of Gordians I and II when Pupienus and Balbinus were elected as emperors and may have been restored again following a fire in AD 284. If still in use, the temple would have been closed during the persecution of pagans under the Christian emperors of the late fourth century. The building, however, remained standing. By the eighth century, the temple was reportedly in poor condition, and in danger of collapsing.

The temple was razed c. 1450, and the stone turned into a lime kiln to recover the marble for building.

== Architecture ==
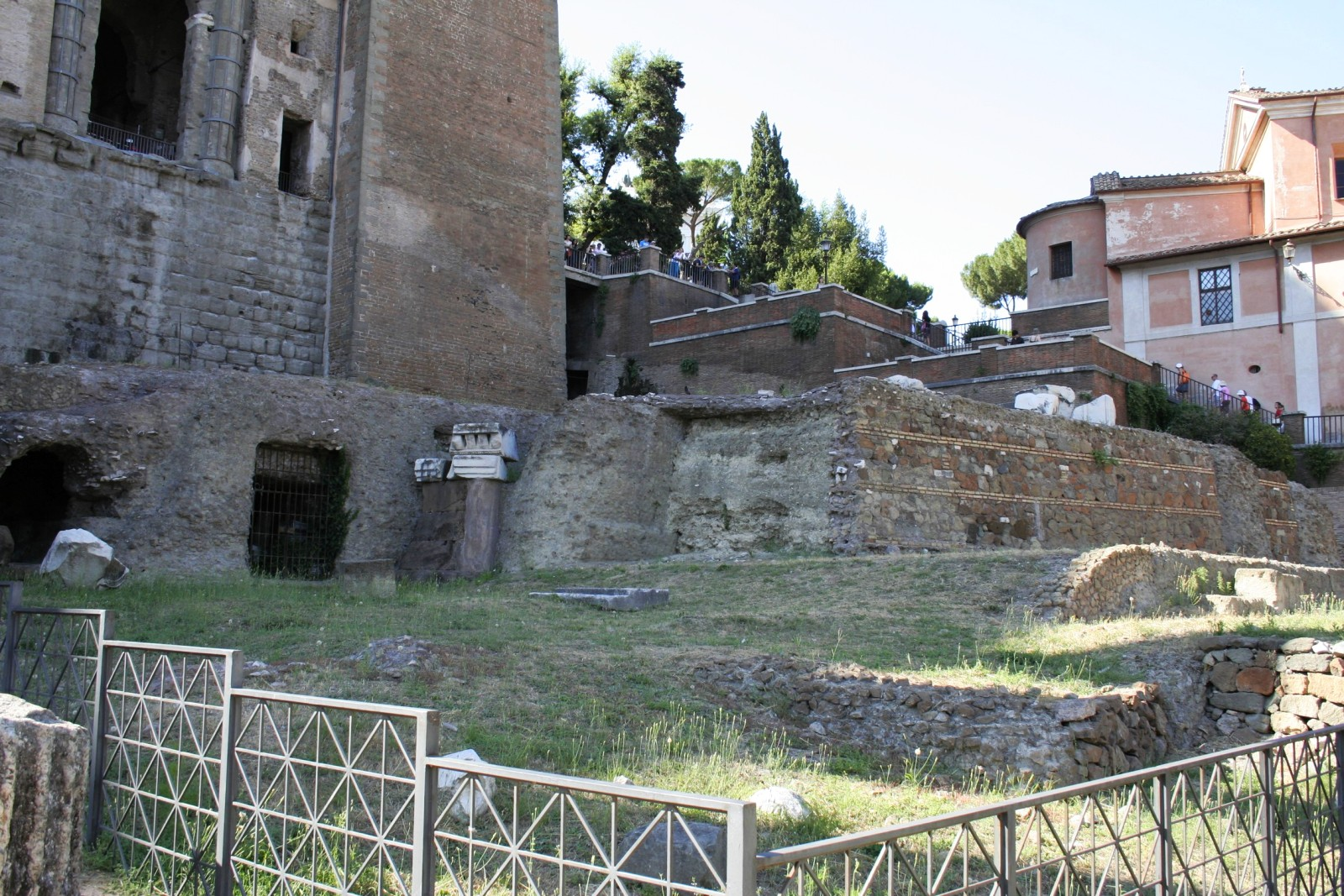
Remains of the Temple of Concord

The Temple of Concord, constructed by Lucius Opimus during the Republican period, had a typical rectangular podium 40.8 m × 30 m (134 ft × 98 ft). Based on the construction methods used in the base and support walls, the porch had eight Corinthian columns made out of travertine drums covered in stucco.

The later construction of the Temple of Concordia Augusta expanded and altered the previous temple. Backed up against the Tabularium at the foot of the Capitoline Hill, the design of the temple had to accommodate the limitations of the site. The cella of the temple, for instance, is almost twice as wide 45 m (148 ft) as it is deep 24 m (79 ft), as is the pronaos. A steep flight of stairs led up to the entrance of the temple on the long side, which would have been flanked by statues of Hercules and Mercury, symbolizing security and prosperity. A fragment of the marble threshold of the cella is preserved and features an engraved caduceus or wand of Mercury, which represented peace and reconciliation. Three statues were positioned on the apex of the pediment, which represented Concord along with two other goddess, Pax and Salus (or Securitas and Fortuna). Two soldiers, representing Tiberius and his brother Drusus, stood on either side of them. In the cella, a row of Corinthian columns rose from a continuous plinth projecting from the wall, which divided the cella into bays, each containing a niche. The capitals of these columns had pairs of leaping rams in place of the corner volutes. Only the platform now remains, partially covered by a road up to the Capitol.

== Other temples ==
The main temple in the Forum in Rome seems to have been a model for temples to the goddess elsewhere in the empire—a reproduction of this temple was found at Mérida in Spain, during the excavations of the town's forum in 2002.

== See also ==
- List of Ancient Roman temples

== Bibliography ==
- Marcus Tullius Cicero, De Domo Sua, Epistulae ad Atticum, In Catilinam, Philippicae, Pro Murena, Pro Sestio.
- Gaius Sallustius Crispus (Sallust), Bellum Catilinae (The Conspiracy of Catiline).
- Titus Livius (Livy), History of Rome.
- Publius Ovidius Naso (Ovid), Fasti.
- Gaius Plinius Secundus (Pliny the Elder), Historia Naturalis (Natural History).
- Plutarchus, Lives of the Noble Greeks and Romans.
- Gaius Suetonius Tranquillus, De Vita Caesarum (Lives of the Caesars, or The Twelve Caesars).
- Appianus Alexandrinus (Appian), Bellum Civile (The Civil War).
- Lucius Cassius Dio Cocceianus (Cassius Dio), Roman History.
- Julius Obsequens, Liber de Prodigiis (The Book of Prodigies).
- Augustine of Hippo, De Civitate Dei (The City of God).
- Theodor Mommsen et alii, Corpus Inscriptionum Latinarum (The Body of Latin Inscriptions, abbreviated CIL), Berlin-Brandenburgische Akademie der Wissenschaften (1853–present).
- Rodolfo Lanciani, Pagan and Christian Rome, Houghton, Mifflin and Company, Boston and New York (1892).
- Harper's Dictionary of Classical Literature and Antiquities, Harry Thurston Peck, ed. (Second Edition, 1897).
- Samuel Ball Platner & Thomas Ashby, A Topographical Dictionary of Ancient Rome, Oxford University Press (1929).
- Claridge, Amanda. 2010. Rome: An Oxford Archaeological Guide. 2nd ed., revised and expanded. Oxford: Oxford University Press.
- Gorski, Gilbert, and James E. Packer. 2015. The Roman Forum: A Reconstruction and Architectural Guide. New York : Cambridge University Press.
- Coarelli, Filippo. 2007. Rome and Environs: An Archaeological Guide. Berkeley: University of California Press.
