= Honos =

Roman personification of honor

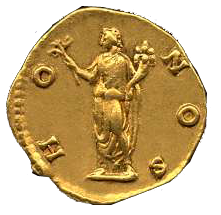
Aureus depicting Honos bearing an olive branch and a cornucopia.

In ancient Roman religion, Honos, (Latin: [ˈhɔnoːs̠]) also rendered Honor, (Latin: [ˈhɔnɔr]) was the deified personification of honor. He was typically depicted wearing a laurel wreath and holding an olive branch and a cornucopia.

Honos was closely associated with Virtus, the deified personification of Roman masculinity and valor; the pair were commonly worshipped together.

== Temples ==
=== Temple of Honor and Virtue ===
In 234 BC, Quintus Fabius Maximus Verrucosus dedicated a temple to Honos along the Appian Way following his victory over the Ligures. It was situated just outside the Porta Capena, one of Rome's principal gates. Twelve years later, after Marcus Claudius Marcellus defeated and slew the Gallic king Viridomarus at the Battle of Clastidium, he vowed a temple to Honos and Virtus in order to win the spolia opima. In 212 BC, he renewed this vow after capturing Syracuse during the Second Punic War; while consul in 208 BC, he attempted to fulfill it by rededicating the existing temple in the name of both gods. The College of Pontiffs refused to allow this, so Marcellus ordered the restoration of the temple of Honos and arranged the construction of a second, adjoining shrine dedicated to Virtus.

Marcellus was slain in an ambush near Venusia later that year, so the temple was eventually dedicated by his son, the consul Marcus Claudius Marcellusin 205 BC. It was richly adorned with treasures that Marcellus had looted from Syracuse, although many of them disappeared over the next two centuries. The temple was later restored by the emperor Vespasian, and was still standing in the fourth century.

=== Capitoline temple ===
Another temple dedicated to Honos and Virtus was built by Gaius Marius during his fifth consulship in 101 BC, and was built using the spoils he captured from the Cimbri and the Teutones. The shrine was probably built along the Via Sacra on the slopes of the Capitoline Hill, and was designed by the architect Gaius Mucius. It was here that the Roman Senate voted to recall Cicero from exile in 57 BC. Velia

== Bibliography ==
- Marcus Tullius Cicero, De Divinatione (On Divination), De Natura Deorum (On the Nature of the Gods), De Republica (On the Republic), In Verrem, Pro Sestio, Pro Plancio.
- Marcus Vitruvius Pollio, De Architectura (On Architecture).
- Titus Livius (Livy), History of Rome.
- Valerius Maximus, Factorum ac Dictorum Memorabilium (Memorable Facts and Sayings).
- Gaius Plinius Secundus (Pliny the Elder), Historia Naturalis (Natural History).
- Lucius Mestrius Plutarchus (Plutarch), Lives of the Noble Greeks and Romans.
- Quintus Aurelius Symmachus, Epistulae (Letters).
- Harper's Dictionary of Classical Literature and Antiquities, Harry Thurston Peck, ed. (Second Edition, 1897).
- Samuel Ball Platner & Thomas Ashby, A Topographical Dictionary of Ancient Rome, Oxford University Press (1929).
