= Temple of Honor and Virtue =

Ancient Roman temple in Rome

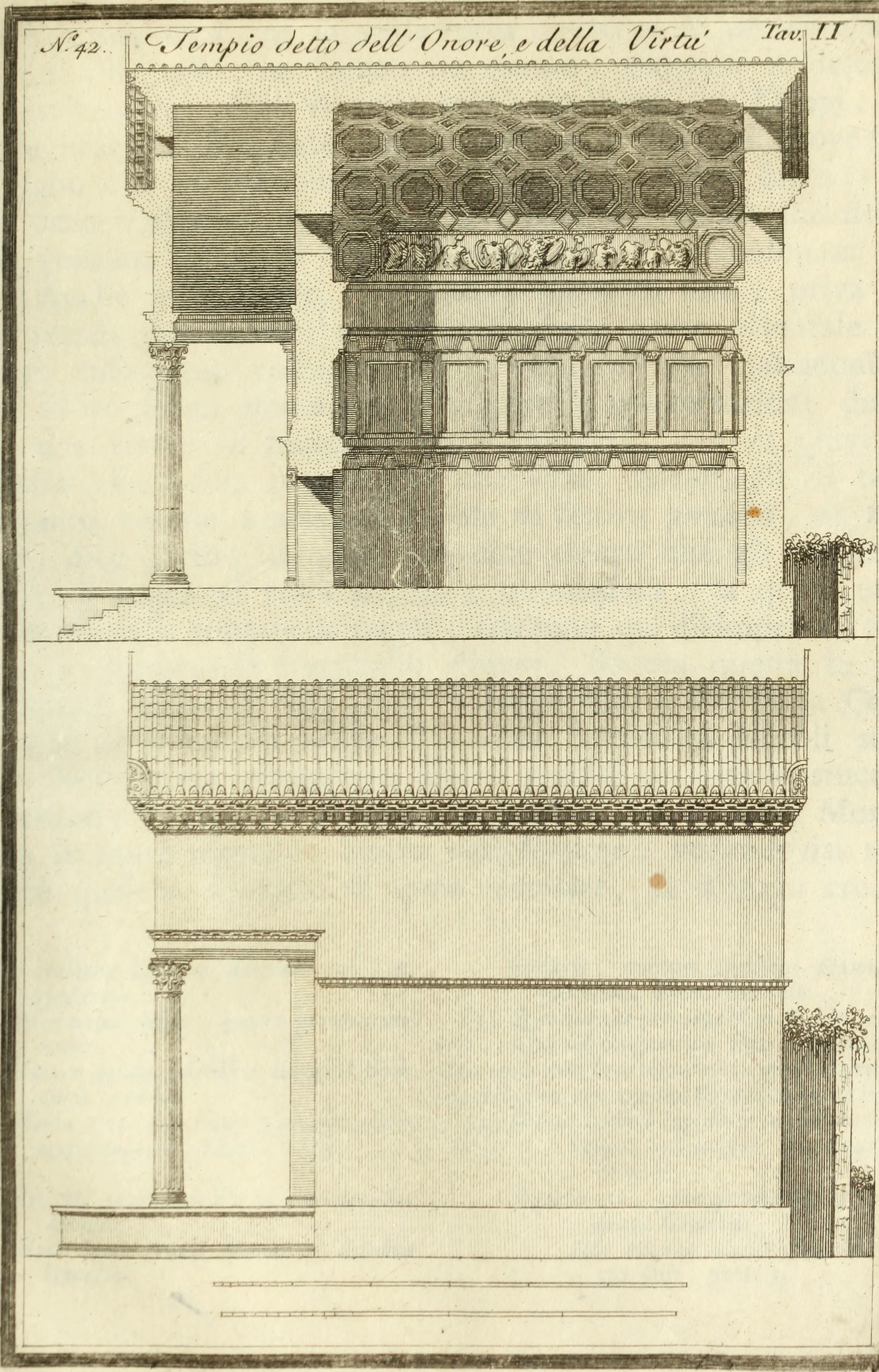
An illustration of the Temple of Honor and Virtue.

The Temple of Honor and Virtue (Latin: Aedes Honoris et Virtutis) was an ancient Roman temple in Rome, Italy dedicated to Virtus and Honos.

While no remains survive, it is known from ancient sources to have been sited just outside the Porta Capena, probably on the northern side of the Via Appia in front of the Ara Fortuna Redux. It is the first entry for Regio I in the regional catalogues.

== History ==
It was first dedicated solely to Honor on 17 July 234 BC by Quintus Fabius Maximus Verrucosus after his victory over the Liguri. After the Battle of Clastidium in 222 BC, Marcus Claudius Marcellus vowed to dedicate a temple to Honor and Virtue, a vow he renewed after the capture of Syracuse. In 208 BC he tried to fulfil the vow by rededicating the existing temple to Honor, but the pontifical college forbade it, since one cella could not be dedicated to both gods as - if a prodigy occurred in it - they would not know which god to sacrifice to in thanks. Marcellus instead restored the temple of Honor and built a new cella opposite it to Virtue, turning the existing temple into a double temple.

This new double temple was dedicated by Marcellus' son in 205 BC. It housed several art treasures looted from Syracuse by Marcellus, though these had largely vanished by the time of Livy. It also housed the aedicula Camenarum, the ancient bronze shrine thought to date back to the time of Numa Pompilius, which was later transferred to the temple of Hercules Musarum. The temple was later restored by Vespasian and decorated by the artists Cornelius Pinus and Attius Priscus. It is last mentioned in the 4th century, in the regional catalogues. If still in use by the 4th-century, it would have been closed during the persecution of pagans in the late Roman Empire.

== See also ==
- List of Ancient Roman temples
- List of ancient sites in Rome

== Bibliography ==
- Platner, Samuel Ball; Ashby, Thomas (1929). "Honos et Virtus, Aedes". A Topographical Dictionary of Ancient Rome. London: Oxford University Press. pp. 258–260.
