= Meta Sudans =

Fountain in ancient Rome

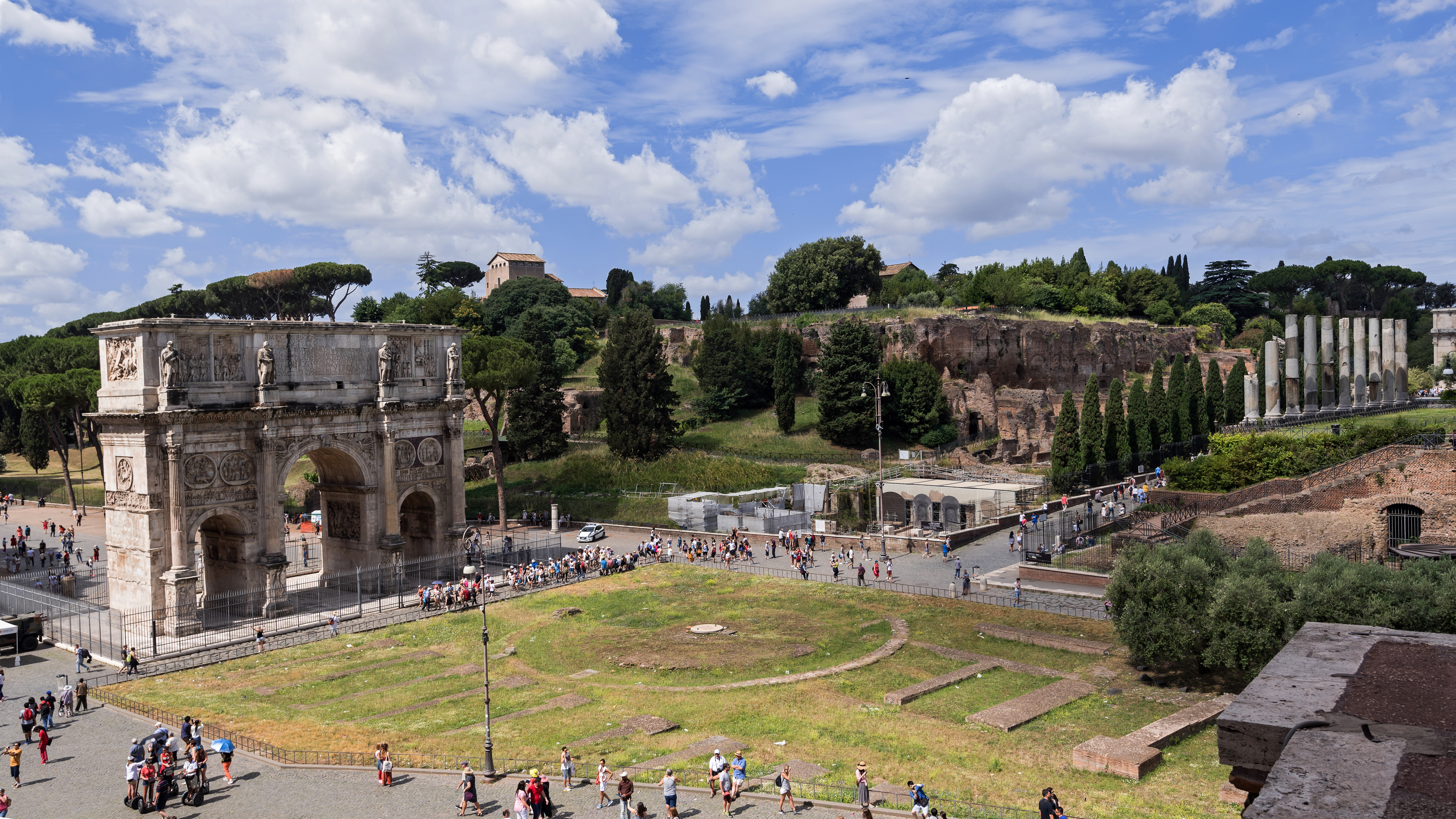
- The Arch of Constantine seen from the Colosseum. The foundation of the Meta Sudans is visible in front of the arch

- Location within Rome
- 41.8900812°N 12.4906909°E
- Type: fountain
- Location: Regio III: Isis et Serapis

History
- Built: Imperial period
- Built by: Flavian emperors

The Meta Sudans (Latin: "sweating turning post") was a large monumental conical fountain in ancient Rome.

== Date and location ==
The Meta Sudans was built some time between 89 and 96 under the Flavian emperors, a few years after the AD 80 completion of the nearby Colosseum. It was built between the Colosseum and the Temple of Venus and Roma, close to the later Arch of Constantine, at the juncture of four regions of ancient Rome: regions I, III, IV, X (and perhaps II).

== Name, function, and structure ==
A meta was a tall conical object in a Roman circus that stood at either end of the central spina, around which racing chariots would turn. The Meta Sudans had the same shape, and also functioned as a similar kind of turning point, in that it marked the spot where a Roman triumphal procession would turn left from the via Triumphalis along the east side of the Palatine onto the via Sacra and into the Forum Romanum itself.

The Meta Sudans was built of a brick and concrete core, faced with marble. It seems to have "sweated" the water (sudans means "sweating"), rather than jetting it out the top. This may mean that it oozed out the top, or perhaps that water came from holes in its side. The monument is estimated to have stood up to 17 m tall; until the 20th century, its concrete core was still over 9 m high. It had a base pool 16 m wide and 1.4 m deep.

== Destruction, remains ==
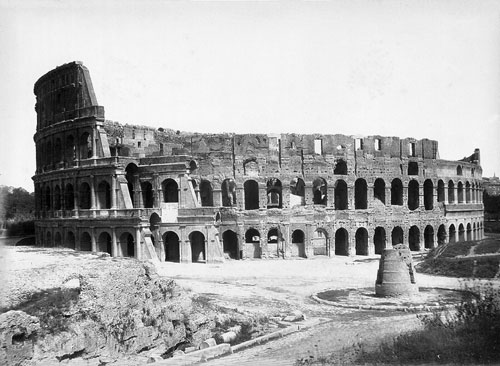
The Meta Sudans in front of the Colosseum in 1858

The fountain was obviously damaged in the Middle Ages because it already appears as a ruin in early views of the Colosseum. Photos from the end of the 19th century show a conical structure of solid bricks next to the Arch of Constantine, surrounded by its own original, reflecting stone pool. The ruins of Meta Sudans survived until 1936, when Benito Mussolini had its remains demolished and paved over to make room for the new traffic circle around the Colosseum. A commemorative plaque was set in the road. Although the above-ground structure is gone, its foundations were later re-excavated, revealing the extensive substructure. After another excavation in 1997-98 the traffic circle was closed and the area became a pedestrian zone.

Extensive excavations directed by Clementina Panella of the University of Rome "La Sapienza" have revealed extensive archaeological information about the Meta Sudans and the northeast slope of the Palatine Hill.

== Sources ==
- "Meta Sudans" From Samuel Ball Platner, A Topographical Dictionary of Ancient Rome, rev. Thomas Ashby. Oxford, 1929, p. 340-341.
- Coarelli, Filippo, Guida Archeologica di Roma, Milano: Arnoldo Mondadori Editore, 1989, ISBN 88-04-11896-2.
- Claridge, Amanda, Rome: An Oxford Archaeological Guide, New York: Oxford University Press, 1998, ISBN 0-19-288003-9.
- ROMA – VALLE DEL COLOSSEO – PALATINO NORD-ORIENTALE
- Panella, Clementina. 1996. Meta sudans. I: Un'area sacra in Palatio e la valle del Colosseo prima e dopo Nerone. Rome: Istituto poligrafico e zecca dello stato : Libreria dello Stato.
