= Margareta Steinby =

Finnish archaeologist

Margareta Steinby FSA
- Born: Eva Margareta Steinby; 21 November 1938 (age 87); Viipuri, Finland

Academic background
- Education: University of Helsinki

Academic work
- Discipline: Archaeology
- Institutions: University of Oxford
- Doctoral students: Rubina Raja

Eva Margareta Steinby FSA (born 21 November 1938; Wilén until 1961) is a Finnish classical archaeologist. She was the director of the Finnish Institute in Rome from 1979–1982 and 1992–1994, and Professor of the Archaeology of the Roman Empire at the Institute of Archaeology, University of Oxford from 1994 to 2004. She is best known for her work on the architecture and topography of Rome, especially due to her contributions to the Lexicon Topographicum Urbis Romae (1993-2000).

== Biography ==
Steinby was assistant director (1973–1977) and then director (1979–1982, 1992–1994) of the Finnish Institute in Rome. She then returned to Finland as senior research fellow at the Academy of Finland in Helsinki. Steinby was Professor of Archaeology of the Roman Empire at Oxford, a post held previously by Ian Richmond and Sheppard Frere, and fellow at All Souls College from 1994–2004. She was elected member of the Finnish Society of Sciences and Letters in 1983 and Honorary member in 2020. She was elected member of the Society of Antiquaries of London in 1997. In 1999 she was elected Corresponding Member of the Archaeological Institute of America. She was elected emeritus fellow of All Souls College in 2004.

Her major work was as the editor of the six volume multilingual reference work on the topography of Ancient Rome, the Lexicon Topographicum Urbis Romae. In 2007, a supplement to the Lexicon topographicum urbis Romae was published in her honour. She received the Order of the White Rose of Finland in 1991.

== Selected publications ==
- Steinby, M. 1974. I bolli laterizi degli antiquari del Foro e del Palatino. Roma: Accademia nazionale dei Lincei.
- Steinby, M. 1974. La cronologia delle figlinae doliari urbane dalla fine dell'età repubblicana fino all'inizio del iii sec. Bullettino, Comm. arch. comunale di Roma. Spoleto.
- Steinby, M. 1986. “L'industria laterizia di Roma nel tardo impero.” In A. Giardina. Società romana e impero tardoantico, Vol. 2: Roma: Politica, Economia, Paesaggio Urbano. Editori laterza. pp. 99–164.
- Steinby, M. 2003. La Necropoli della Via Triumphalis Roma.
