= Virtus (deity) =

Roman deity

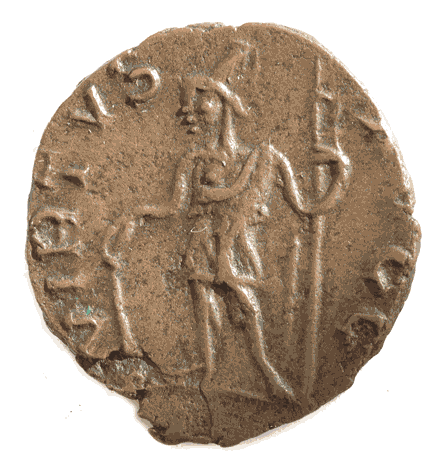
Gallic coin featuring Virtus

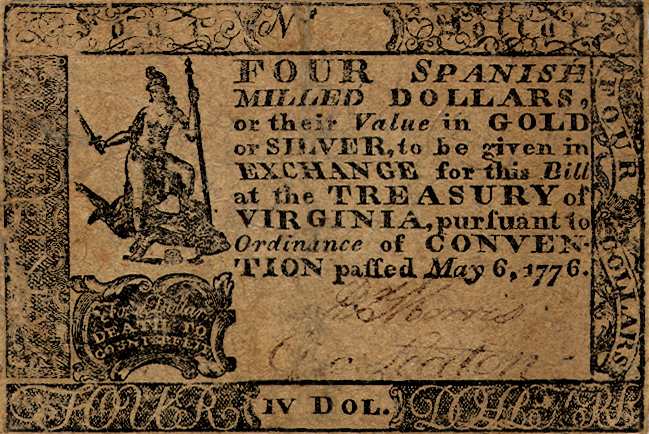
U.S. Continental currency Virginia four-dollar note of 1776 (obverse) with Virtus at the left

In ancient Roman religion, Virtus (Latin pronunciation: [ˈwɪrtuːs̠]) was the deity of bravery and military strength, the personification of the Roman virtue of virtus. The Greek equivalent deity was Arete. The deity was often associated with the Roman god Honos (personification of honour) and was often honoured together with him, such as in the Temple of Virtus and Honos at the Porta Capena in Rome. It was after the conquest of Syracuse in 205 B.C.E that the Virtus portion of the temple was added, and in such a way that one had to enter the temple of Virtus before Honos, symbolizing that honor cannot be obtained without military success.

Virtus also served as a deity to represent a continuous belief of virtue, after the Fall of Rome. Virtus is mentioned throughout Christian Medieval literature, especially throughout the Byzantine Empire and States of the Holy Roman Empire at the time. Virtue, as represented by Virtus, represented both character traits, and mythical power.

The deity was represented in a variety of ways, for example, on the coins of Tetricus, they could appear as a matron, an old man, or a young man, with a javelin, battle helmet, or only clothed in a cape. Within the realm of funerary reliefs Virtus is never shown without a male companion. Often their presence within this realm of art is to complement and provide assistance to the protagonist of the relief during a scene of intense masculinity or bravery.

== Hercules ==
Virtus is most commonly known in the story of Hercules. Hercules finds himself at a crossroads, where has to choose between Virtus and Voluptas, essentially vice and virtue. Hercules has to choose between a life of ease and glutton or between a life of valor and strength. Hercules eventually chooses Virtus.

== Modern era ==
In the United States in 1776, Virtus was made the central figure in the Seal of Virginia and the subsequent state flag, which features the seal. The Virginia four-dollar note, a Continental currency, had a similar Virtus pictured on its obverse. Virtus' use during the American Revolution stems from the idea of civic virtue, an idea deriving from both Enlightenment ideas, and the character value of bravery.

A flag of Virginia with Virtus on it.

== See also ==
- Hercules at the crossroads
