= A Topographical Dictionary of Ancient Rome =

Reference work by Samuel Ball Platner

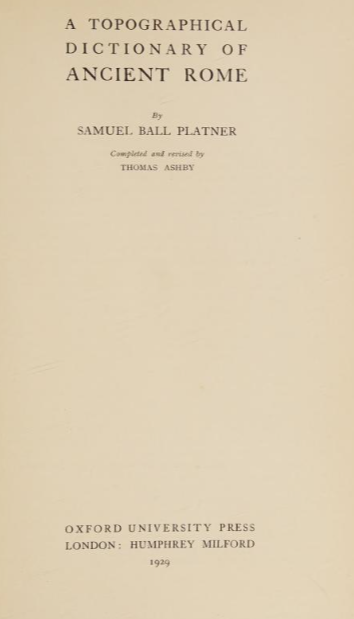
- Title page for A Topographical Dictionary of Ancient Rome (1929 edition)
- Author: Samuel Ball Platner
- Language: English
- Published: 1904
- Publisher: Allyn and Bacon
- Publication place: United States

A Topographical Dictionary of Ancient Rome is a reference work written by Samuel Ball Platner (1863–1921).

The first edition was published in 1904; the second edition ('revised and enlarged') was published in 1911 (both: Allyn and Bacon, Boston).

The book was completed by Thomas Ashby after Platner's death and published in 1929 by Oxford University Press. Referred to as 'Platner and Ashby', the volume describes the ancient monuments and buildings in the city of Rome, although by and large only if they belong to the classical period. It covers both remains that are still extant and buildings of which not a trace remained, and collates source documents for each. This volume was, for fifty or sixty years, the standard reference in the field of Roman topography, having superseded Rodolfo Lanciani's Forma Urbis Romae (1893–1901).

Platner and Ashby has since itself been superseded by a reworking, L. Richardson, Jr.'s A New Topographical Dictionary of Ancient Rome, but mostly by the new standard, a completely new work, Margareta Steinby's Lexicon Topographicum Urbis Romae (six volumes, 1993–2000).

== See also ==
- Topography of ancient Rome
- List of ancient monuments in Rome
- History of Rome
