= The Adventures of Mabel =

1896 novel by Harry Thurston Peck

- Author: Harry Thurston Peck (as Rafford Pyke)
- Publication date: January 1, 1896

The Adventures of Mabel is a children's fantasy novel by Harry Thurston Peck, first published in 1897 under the pseudonym Rafford Pyke.

== Plot ==
The story is about Mabel, a five-year-old girl who helps the King of all the lizards and is rewarded with the ability to converse with animals. She also meets giants and brownies.

== History ==
The first edition of The Adventures of Mabel was published in 1897 by Dodd, Mead & Co. under the pseudonym "Rafford Pyke" with illustrations by Melanie Elisabeth Norton. At the time, Peck was the editor of The Bookman, a literary journal which published an effusive review of The Adventures of Mabel in December 1897 under the byline Nicholas Brown, and had previously published an article under Peck's name announcing the book's release by "Pyke". The conflicts of interest were not disclosed. When The Adventures of Mabel was mentioned in the episode "Mabel" of the television show Better Call Saul as a childhood book beloved by protagonist Jimmy McGill, commentators noted parallels between Peck's and McGill's uses of pseudonyms, and compared the development of McGill's plot arc to the real-life fate of Peck, who died by suicide in 1914 after being cut off by literary colleagues in the fallout from an alleged love affair.

== Reception ==
Kirkus Reviews stated that the book may entertain young children. This sentiment was echoed by The New York Times, which lauded the book for young readers. The illustrations were praised by The Evangelist as "original and amusing". Kirkus criticised the book's word choice and loosely connected structure. The imagination of the book was described by The Critic as infantile, and its story was criticised by The Nation.
