= Lexicon Topographicum Urbis Romae =

The Lexicon Topographicum Urbis Romae (1993–2000) is a six-volume, multilingual reference work considered to be the major, modern work covering the topography of ancient Rome. The editor is Eva Margareta Steinby, and the publisher is Edizioni Quasar of Rome. It is considered the successor to Platner and Ashby's A Topographical Dictionary of Ancient Rome.

An ongoing series of supplements provides additional coverage of Roman topography and important topics in the archaeology of the city.

1. M. A. Tomei and P. Liverani. Lexicon topographicum urbis Romae. Supplementum. I, Carta archeologica di Roma. Primo quadrante. Rome: Edizioni Quasar, 2005. ISBN 9788871402734.
2. F. Coarelli. Lexicon topographicum urbis Romae. / Supplementum II. 1, Gli scavi di Roma 1878-1921. Rome: Edizioni Quasar, 2004. ISBN 9788870970524.
3. F. Coarelli et al. Lexicon topographicum urbis Romae. Supplementum II. 2, Gli scavi di Roma, 1922-1975. Rome: Edizioni Quasar, 2006. ISBN 9788871402949.
4. Carlo Pavolini. Lexicon topographicum urbis Romae. Supplementum. III, Archeologia e topografia della regione II (Celio) : un aggiornamento sessant'anni dopo Colini. Rome: Edizioni Quasar, 2006. ISBN 9788871402987.
5. Anna Leone, Domenico Palombi, Susan Walker (ed.), Res bene gestae: ricerche di storia urbana su Roma antica in onore di Eva Margareta Steinby. Lexicon Topographicum Urbis Romae, Supplementum, IV. Rome: Edizioni Quasar, 2007. Pp. xviii, 478; 169 ills. ISBN 9788871403533.
6. Elisabetta Carnabuci. Lexicon topographicum urbis Romae. Suppl. V, Lexicon topographicum urbis Romae : Supplementum V: regia : nuovi dati archeologici dagli appunti inediti di Giacomo Boni. Rome: Edizioni Quasar, 2012. ISBN 9788871404998.
7. Lexicon topographicum urbis Romae. Supplementum VII, scritti in onore di Lvcos Cozza. Rome: Edizioni Quasar, 2014. ISBN 9788871405551.

A subsequent series, Lexicon topographicum urbis Romae: Suburbium, edited by Adriano La Regina and produced by Edizioni Quasar covers sites in the suburbium of ancient Rome.

== Reviews ==
- R. B. Ulrich. 1995. "Review Article: Archaeological Reference Texts and the Information Age." American Journal of Archaeology 99.1:147-50.
- Catharine Edwards. 1996. "Roma Depicta." Review in The Classical Review (New Series), 46.02:354-356
- Review by Gregory S. Bucher BMCR 2001.04.02
