= Filippo Coarelli =

Italian archaeologist and topographer

- Born: 1936 aged (88-89); Rome, Italy
- Occupations: Archaeologist and university teacher
- Known for: Classical archaeology; Roman archaeology

Academic background
- Education: Università di Roma 'La Sapienza'
- Doctoral advisor: Ranuccio Bianchi Bandinelli

Academic work
- Discipline: Archaeology
- Institutions: University of Perugia

Filippo Coarelli is an Italian archaeologist, Professor of Greek and Roman Antiquities at the University of Perugia.

Born in Rome, Coarelli was a student of Ranuccio Bianchi Bandinelli. Coarelli is one of the foremost experts on Roman antiquities and the history of early Rome. A leading expert on the topography of ancient Rome, Coarelli produced a series of books from the 1980s and 1990s that have altered modern thinking about how Roman topography developed. His work on Italian monumental sanctuaries of the late Roman Republic is considered standard.

He led the team that discovered what is believed to be the villa in which Vespasian was born at Falacrinae. Together with British colleagues, he has long been involved in the archaeological exploration and documentation of Fregellae.

His important and influential handbook furnishing an archaeological guide to Rome and its environs was translated into English by Daniel P. Harmon and James J. Clauss.

In 1997, he was elected a member of the Academia Europaea.

== Works ==
- Il foro romano 3 v. Ed. Quasar (1983–2020).
- Dictionnaire méthodique de l'architecture grecque et romaine (editor, 1985).
- I santuari del Lazio in età repubblicana (1987).
- Il foro boario : dalle origini alla fine della repubblica (1988).
- Numerous contributions to Lexicon Topographicum Urbis Romae, E. M. Steinby, ed. (Quasar).
- Da Pergamo a Roma: i Galati nella città degli Attalidi (1995).
- Coarelli, Filippo. "I LUCILII E UNA NUOVA ISCRIZIONE REPUBBLICANA DA SINUESSA." Cahiers Du Centre Gustave Glotz 7 (1996): 259-62. Accessed May 27, 2021.
- Il Campo Marzio: dalle origini alla fine della Repubblica (1997).
- Belli e l'antico: con 50 sonetti di G. G. Belli (2000)
- The column of Trajan (2000).
- The Colosseum (2001).
- Coarelli, Filippo. "Les "Saepta" Et La Technique Du Vote à Rome De La Fin De La République à Auguste." Pallas, no. 55 (2001): 37-51. Accessed May 27, 2021.
- Coarelli, Filippo. "Substructio Et Tabularium." Papers of the British School at Rome 78 (2010): 107-32. Accessed May 27, 2021.
- Coarelli, Filippo. "VIA CAECILIA E VIA SALARIA UNA PROPOSTA." Archeologia Classica 67 (2016): 215-32. Accessed May 27, 2021.
