= Rodolfo Lanciani =

Italian archaeologist (1845–1929)

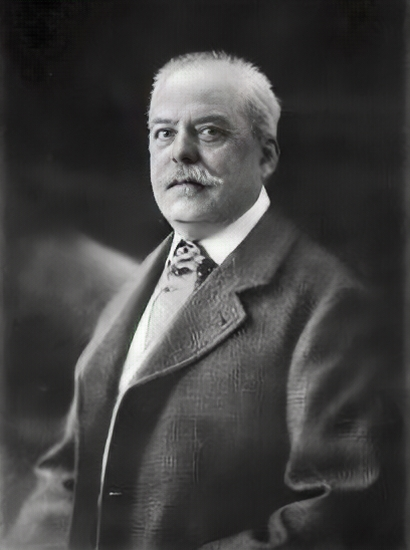
Rodolfo Lanciani

Rodolfo Amedeo Lanciani (1 January 1845 – 22 May 1929) was an Italian archaeologist, a pioneering student of ancient Roman topography. Among his many excavations was that of the House of the Vestals in the Roman Forum.

Lanciani earned LL.D. degrees from Aberdeen, Glasgow, and Harvard and a Ph.D. degree from Würzburg.

== Life ==
Lanciani was born in Rome, although some state he was born in Montecelio, now Guidonia Montecelio. He was professor of Roman topography at the Università di Roma from 1878 until 1927. He is known today chiefly for his Forma Urbis Romae (1893‑1901) and the Storia degli scavi, a regular summary of Roman excavations that started appearing in 1902. His students included Giulio Giglioli. Together with important British art historians such as Austen Henry Layard he re-edited the original 1843 guidebook to Rome for John Murray.

He was a member of the Accademia dei Lincei, the Academia di S. Lucia, the Berlin Institute, the Royal Academy of Belgium, and the Archaeological Society of Brussels. He was an International Member of the American Philosophical Society. He received numerous honorary degrees, including those from Aberdeen, Würzburg, Oxford, Harvard, and Glasgow.

Lanciani was married twice. He married Mary Ellen Rhodes (1842–1914) of Providence, Rhode Island, in July 1875.

Lanciani formed a core of distinguished late nineteenth-century scholars of the Roman Forum including Henri Jordan, Christian Huelsen, Samuel Ball Platner, and Thomas Ashby. Richard Brilliant described Lanciani's Ruins and Excavations of Ancient Rome as "undiminished in vitality as a study of ancient Roman ruins" (1967).

== Forma Urbis Romae ==
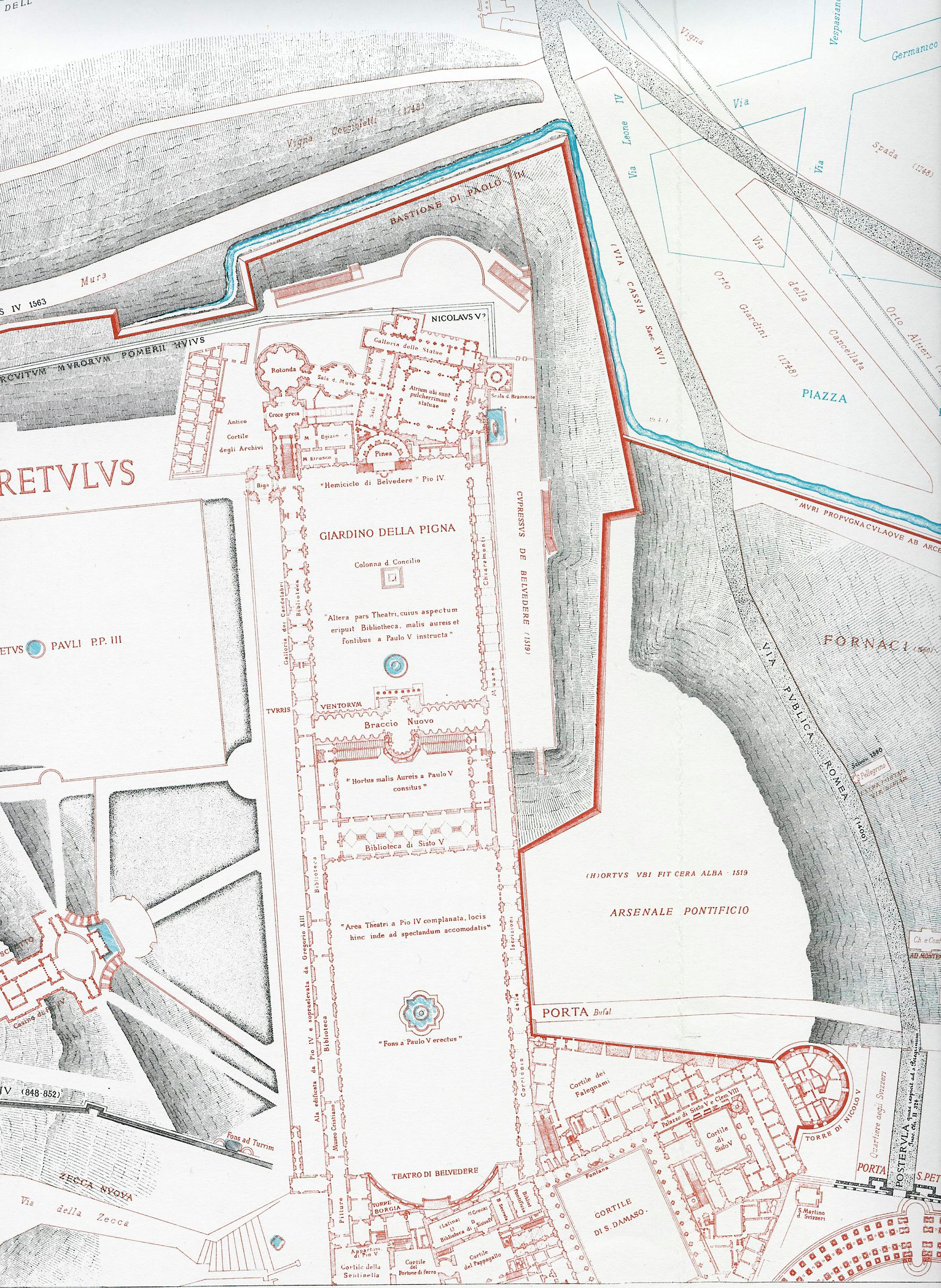
Forma Urbis Romae. Plate VI

Lanciani's great work was the production of a map of the ancient city of Rome, a "unique work within the genre". It shares the (modern) name of the ancient (Severan) marble map, the Forma Urbis Romae. It is a set of 46 detailed maps of ancient Rome, issued in 1893–1901. The maps measure 25 by 36 inches, at a scale of 1:1000. The map outlines ancient features in black, early modern features (based on the Nolli map of 1748) in red, and modern features (as of 1893) in blue.

The modern Atlas of Ancient Rome by Andrea Carandini is a "systematic update... and a reformulation of the information" of Lanciani's Forma Urbis.

== Archives ==
Lanciani assembled a sizable documentary collection of images and material related to Rome's history during his lifetime. These include thousands of photographs of excavations and discoveries taken by Lanciani himself, but also constitute thousands of pages of maps, watercolors, as well as about 15,000 historic prints and drawings. 3,000 volumes of documentation were bequeathed to the National Institute of Archaeology and Art History in Rome upon Lanciani's death in 1929; the collection occupies its own room in the Palazzo Venezia. The collection was digitized and made available to the public through an online database started in 2017 by researchers at Stanford University Libraries, Dartmouth College, and the University of Oregon.

== Bibliography ==
- L'aula e gli uffici del senato romano. (Curia hostilia iulia: Secretarium senatus) (1883)
- Ancient Rome in the light of recent discoveries (1888) (online at LacusCurtius)
- L'itinerario di Einsiedeln e l'ordine di Benedetto canonico (1891)
- Pagan and Christian Rome (1893) (online at LacusCurtius) (online at ProjectGutenberg)
- The ruins and excavations of ancient Rome; a companion book for students and travelers (1897) (online) * The destruction of ancient Rome; a sketch of the history of the monuments (1899) (online at InternetArchive)
- Forma Urbis Romae, 1893–1901, online in full (with some broken internal links); as one PDF; republished in 1994, ISBN 8870970132 and 2007, ISBN 8871403479; at the Rumsey Map Collection
- New tales of old Rome (1901) (online at InternetArchive)
- The golden days of the renaissance in Rome, from the pontificate of Julius II to that of Paul III (1906) (online at InternetArchive)
- Wanderings in the Roman campagna (1909) (online at InternetArchive)
- The Roman forum; a photographic description of its monuments. 1910. Archived from the original on 2012-10-25 – via Questia.
- Ancient and modern Rome (1925)
- Notes from Rome (republ. 1988)
- Storia degli scavi di Roma e notizie intorno le collezioni romane di antichità Editorial projected coordinated by Leonello Malvezzi Campeggi. Thus far (2006), 7 volumes have appeared. (volumes 1, 2, 3 and 4 online at InternetArchive)
  - Vol. 1, Storia degli scavi di Roma e notizie intorno le collezioni romane di antichità (A. 1000–1530), 1902.
  - Vol. 2: ... Gli ultimi anni di Clemente VII e il pontificato di Paolo III (1531–1549), 1903.
  - Vol. 3: ... Dalla elezione di Giulio III alla morte di Pio IV (7 febbraio 1550 - 10 dicembre 1565), 1907.
  - Vol. 4: ... Dalla elezione di Pio V alla morte di Clemente VIII (7 gennaio 1566 – 3 marzo 1605), 1912.
  - edited by Paolo Liverani, Maria Rosaria Russo: Storia degli scavi di Roma e notizie intorno le collezioni romane di antichità. Dalla elezione di Paolo V alla morte di Innocenzo XII : 16 maggio 1605 – 27 settembre 1700. Vol. 5, 1994.
  - edited by Paolo Liverani, Maria Rosaria Russo: Storia degli scavi di Roma e notizie intorno le collezioni romane di antichità. Dalla elezione di Clemente XI alla morte di Pio IX (23 novembre 1700-7 febbraio 1878). Vol. 6, 2000.
  - edited by Paolo Pellegrino: Storia degli scavi di Roma e notizie intorno le collezioni romane di antichità. Indici analitici. Vol. 7, 2002.

== See also ==
- Tombs of Via Latina
- Plan of Rome (Bigot)
