= Institute of Archaeology (Oxford) =

Academic department of the University of Oxford

The Institute of Archaeology is an academic department of the University of Oxford devoted to the teaching and research of archaeology. Together with the Research Laboratory for Archaeology and the History of Art, it forms part of the School of Archaeology. Its current director is Chris Gosden.

== History ==
The origins of the Institute go back to 1946, when Christopher Hawkes was appointed Oxford's first Professor of European Prehistory and Ian Richmond the first Professor of the Archaeology of the Roman Empire. Teaching facilities were set up for them at 36 Beaumont Street, which grew into the institute. It was formally founded in 1961, with Hawkes as its first director. Richmond and Hawkes were succeeded by Sheppard Frere and Barry Cunliffe, in respectively 1965 and 1972, who oversaw and expansion of the institute's research and fieldwork facilities in the 1970s. Starting in 1992, Oxford introduced a bachelor's degree in anthropology and archaeology and the Institute became the focal point for undergraduate teaching in archaeology. The following year Margareta Steinby succeeded Frere as Professor of the Archaeology of the Roman Empire. The Sackler Library, situated behind the institute, was opened in 2001. During its construction a Bronze Age ring ditches and a medieval orchard and Carmelite priory were discovered under the foundations. Andrew Wilson has been the Professor of the Archaeology of the Roman Empire since 2004.

== Research centres ==
The institute houses three research centres: Oxford Centre for Maritime Archaeology, Oxford Centre for Asian Archaeology, Art & Culture and Oxford Radiocarbon Accelerator Unit.

== Notable people ==
Professor of European Archaeology (formerly Professor of European Prehistory)

- 1946–1972: Christopher Hawkes
- 1972–2006: Sir Barry Cunliffe
- 2006–present: Chris Gosden

Professor of the Archaeology of the Roman Empire

- 1956–1965: Sir Ian Richmond
- 1966–1983: Sheppard Frere
- 1985–1992: Martin Harrison
- 1994–2004: Eva Margareta Steinby
- 2004–present: Andrew Wilson

Other

- Sonia Chadwick Hawkes
- J. J. Coulton
- John Lloyd

== See also ==
- UCL Institute of Archaeology
- McDonald Institute for Archaeological Research
