= Mabel (Better Call Saul) =

- Better Call Saul episode
- Episode no.: Season 3 Episode 1
- Directed by: Vince Gilligan
- Written by: Vince Gilligan; Peter Gould
- Editing by: Skip Macdonald
- Original air date: April 10, 2017
- Running time: 52 minutes

Guest appearances
- Dylan Riley Snyder as The Shoplifter; Cara Pifko as Paige Novick; Brendan Fehr as Captain Bauer; Joe DeRosa as Dr. Caldera; John Christian Love as Ernesto

Episode chronology
← Previous "Klick"	Next → "Witness"
- Better Call Saul season 3

"Mabel" is the third-season premiere of the American television drama series Better Call Saul, the spinoff series of Breaking Bad. Co-written by series creators Vince Gilligan and Peter Gould and directed by Gilligan, the episode aired on April 10, 2017 on AMC in the United States. Outside of the United States, the episode premiered on streaming service Netflix in several countries.

== Plot ==
=== Opening ===
In a flashforward, Gene Takavic has lunch at the Omaha mall where he manages a Cinnabon. He reluctantly points out a hiding shoplifter to police, but yells to the shoplifter to remain silent and hire a lawyer. After returning to work, a stressed Gene suddenly collapses.

=== Main story ===
Jimmy tells Howard Hamlin that Chuck McGill is not resigning from HHM. He helps Chuck remove the foil from his walls and finds a copy of The Adventures of Mabel, a book that the brothers read together during their youth. Jimmy tries to reminisce but Chuck says he will not forget the fraud Jimmy committed to steal the Mesa Verde account for Kim Wexler. (Note: As depicted in "Fifi".)

Captain Bauer confronts Jimmy about fraudulently entering the Air Force base and threatens to press charges if Jimmy does not pull his commercial off the air. Jimmy momentarily cracks because Bauer's arguments sound like ones Chuck would make but is ultimately unmoved.

Chuck plays Jimmy's confession to Howard, who questions its value since it will not make Mesa Verde return to HHM, and the way it was elicited prevents using it in court, but Chuck assures him the recording has a use. Chuck later asks Ernesto to change the recorder's batteries, and Ernesto hears part of the recording. Chuck compels Ernesto to promise not to repeat what he heard.

Mike Ehrmantraut drives away from the location where he tried to kill Hector Salamanca (Note: As depicted in "Klick".) and unsuccessfully checks his car for a tracking device. Certain he was followed, he completely dismantles the station wagon he was driving at a local junkyard but finds nothing. While looking at a sales display of gas caps, he has an epiphany and takes apart the one from the station wagon, where he finds a battery-operated tracker.

After finding the tracking device, Mike obtains an identical one from Dr. Caldera, studies its function, and discovers it remotely warns the operator when the battery runs low. He replaces the tracker in the gas cap of his sedan with the new one, drains the battery of the one he took from his sedan, and stays awake all night to watch the sedan. In the early morning, someone arrives to change the tracker for one with a fresh battery. Because the man who replaced the tracker is actually carrying the one Mike placed on his car, Mike is able to follow him.

== Production ==
This episode was written by show creators Vince Gilligan and Peter Gould, with Gilligan directing.

== Reception ==
=== Ratings ===
Upon airing, the episode received 1.81 million American viewers, and an 18–49 rating of 0.7.

=== Critical reception ===
The episode received acclaim from critics. On Rotten Tomatoes, the episode has a perfect 100% rating with an average score of 8.67 out of 10 based on 16 reviews. The site's critical consensus reads, "Odenkirk and Banks carry their respective portions of "Mabel" with ease and innuendo in an episode that enlivens its familiar aesthetic with a peppier-than-normal pace."
