= Clementina Panella =

Italian archaeologist

Clementina Panella is an Italian archaeologist, a professor at the University of Rome La Sapienza, where she teaches Methodology of Archaeology. She has guided and co-written a number of articles on the commercial pottery of ancient Italy.

== Career ==
=== Study of ceramics ===
Panella's contribution has been in the field of modern amphora studies, which combine careful observation, quantification and intensive research. She published her analysis of the amphoras from excavation at the baths at Ostia in Studi Miscellanei 13 (1968), 16 (1972), and especially 21 (1973). She has contributed to four major conferences which set the standard for amphora studies today: Recherches sur les amphores romaines, CollEFR 10 (Rome 1972); Méthodes classiques et méthodes formelles dans l'étude des amphores, CollEFR 32 (Rome 1977); Recherches sur les amphores grècques, BCH Suppl. 13 (Paris 1986) and Amphores romaines et histoire économique: Dix ans de recherche, CollEFR 114 (Rome 1989). She worked at Carthage in the early years of the UNESCO archaeological project there.

In addition, she prepared the conclusions of the symposium on sixth and seventh century ceramics in Italy that was held at Rome in honour of John W. Hayes, published as Ceramica in Italia: VI-VII secolo: Atti del Convengo in onore di John W. Hayes, Roma 11-13 maggio 1995, L. Sagui, editor (Florence: Edizioni All’Insegna del Giglio, in series Biblioteca di Archeologia Medievale 14) 1998.

Her continuing interest in the testimony contributed by ancient amphoras, their imprinted bullae of manufacture and the traces of the goods they carried, were reflected in her contribution to The Ancient Economy, 2002 She is often called upon to provide dates for amphorae found at otherwise hard-to-date sites, such as shipwrecks.

=== Excavations ===
In excavations under her direction west of the Colosseum and on the northeast slopes of the Palatine Hill in Rome, the foundations of the Meta Sudans, a fountain of the Augustan era, were uncovered, together with other remains dating from the Late Republic through the Flavian eras. Nearby, on the lower slopes of the Palatine, her recent excavations showed traces of religious cult dating as far back as the late seventh century BCE.

With Patrizio Pensabene she co-edited Arco di Constantino, tra archeologia e archeometria, which summed up the new interpretation of the Arch of Constantine as entirely scavenged sculptural elements reused and modified from a Hadrianic context.

Her excavations in Rome, discovering lead roofing nails melted by the heat of the Great Fire of Rome, were sketched for a general audience in the PBS "Secrets of the Dead" episode on the fire.

In 2006 two reports on the Palatine excavations were newsworthy. In June, the discovery of a carefully secreted wooden box containing imperial scepters and ceremonial lance-heads and halberds, dating to the fourth century. The three scepters had handgrips of orichalcum, the prized golden-colored brass alloy, with glass and chalcedony globes. The following month her report that her team had uncovered the frescoed corridor of a grand aristocratic domus of the first century BCE, the so-called Palatine House, led to hopes that it may prove to be the birthplace of Augustus. In 2015, The New York Times reported on the discovery of the likely site of the shrine of the Curiae veteres within the area of Panella's excavation.
