= Sheppard Frere =

British historian and archaeologist

- Frere in 1989
- Born: 23 August 1916
- Died: 26 February 2015 (aged 98)
- Spouse: Janet Hoare
- Awards: Order of the British Empire, FSA, Fellow of the British Academy
- Scientific career
- Fields: Archaeology
- Workplaces: All Souls College, Oxford

Sheppard Sunderland Frere, CBE, FSA, FBA (23 August 1916 – 26 February 2015) was a British historian and archaeologist who studied the Roman Empire. He was a fellow at All Souls College, Oxford.

== Biography ==
The son of Noel Gray Frere, of the Colonial Service, and his wife Agnes (née Sutherland), Sheppard "Sam" Frere was born in 1916. He was educated at Lancing College and Magdalene College, Cambridge. He was a master at Epsom College from 1938 to 1941, and became classics master and housemaster at Lancing College from 1945 to 1954, when he was in charge of the excavations at Canterbury during his summer vacations. He made a number of broadcasts about his work at that time. He left Lancing in 1954 to become a university lecturer in archaeology at the University of Manchester. His family details and dates are given under the family of 'Frere' in Burke's Landed Gentry for 1969. For three seasons early in the 1970s, he was in charge of the archaeological summer school that excavated the Roman fort at Strageath, near Crieff, in Perthshire.

Between 1955 and 1961 he excavated at Verulamium. He then became Professor of the Archaeology of the Roman Provinces at the University of London from 1961 to 1966 before becoming Professor of the Archaeology of the Roman Empire at Oxford University, where his communicative lectures at the Archaeological Institute, almost always illustrated with visual tools, on Iron Age and Roman Britain and the Rhine frontier of the Roman Empire were well attended. He was married in 1961 to Janet, daughter of Edward Graham Hoare, and had two children, Sarah Barbara Ruth (born 1962) and Bartle Henry David Hoare (born 1963). He was a 4th cousin of paleontologist Mary Leakey and shared with her the same descent from the pioneering discoverer of Old Stone Age John Frere.

Frere was elected as a Fellow of the British Academy in 1971, and became a CBE in 1976. He became an Honorary Corresponding Member of the Deutsches Archäologisches Institut in 1964, and a fellow in 1967.

He died in 2015, aged 98.

== Works ==
- Problems of the Iron Age in Southern Britain; papers given at a C.B.A. conference held at the Institute of Archaeology, 12 to 14 December 1958. Edited by S. S. Frere. [London, University of London, Institute of Archaeology, 1961].
- Britannia: A History of Roman Britain, Cambridge, Mass., Harvard University Press, 1967. Or, London, Routledge & K. Paul, 1967.
  - London: Cardinal, 1974. ISBN 0-351-16310-7
  - Revised edition. London; Boston : Routledge & Kegan Paul, 1978. ISBN 0-7100-8916-3
  - 3rd ed., extensively rev. London; New York: Routledge & Kegan Paul, 1987. ISBN 0-7102-1215-1
  - 4th ed., revised. Folio Society, 1999.
- Verulamium Excavations, London, Society of Antiquaries of London; (Distributed by Thames and Hudson), 1972-<1983 >. ISBN 0-85431-007-X (v. 1)
- Roman Britain from the Air (with J. K. S. St Joseph). Cambridge [Cambridgeshire]; New York : Cambridge University Press, 1983. ISBN 0-521-25088-9
- Trajan’s Column: a new edition of the Cichorius plates; introduction, commentary, and notes by Frank Lepper and Sheppard Frere. Gloucester, UK; Wolfboro, New Hampshire, US: Alan Sutton, 1988. ISBN 0-86299-467-5
- Strageath: excavations within the Roman fort, 1973-86; by S. S. Frere and J. J. Wilkes; with contributions by Anne Anderson ... [et al.]. London: Society for the Promotion of Roman Studies, 1989. ISBN 0-907764-11-8
- The Roman inscriptions of Britain. II, Instrumentum domesticum (personal belongings and the like); by R.G. Collingwood, R.P. Wright, S. Frere, M. Roxan, R. Tomlin. Stroud : Published for the Administrators of the Haverfield Bequest by Alan Sutton Publishing), 1990–95.
- Excavations at Bowes and Lease Rigg Roman Forts; by S. Frere. Leeds : Yorkshire Archaeological Society, 2009.

== Festschriften ==
- Rome and her Northern Provinces: papers presented to Sheppard Frere in honour of his retirement from the Chair of the Archaeology of the Roman Empire, University of Oxford, 1983; edited by Brian Hartley and John Wacher. Gloucester [Gloucestershire]: A. Sutton, 1983. (Includes "A bibliography of the published works of Sheppard Frere": p. 4-12.) ISBN 0-86299-046-7
- Romanitas: essays on Roman archaeology in honour of Sheppard Frere on the occasion of his ninetieth birthday; edited by R. J. A. Wilson. Oxford: Oxbow, 2006. ISBN 1-84217-248-4; ISBN 978-1-84217-248-3
