= Harry Thurston Peck =

American classical scholar, author, editor, and critic (1856-1914)

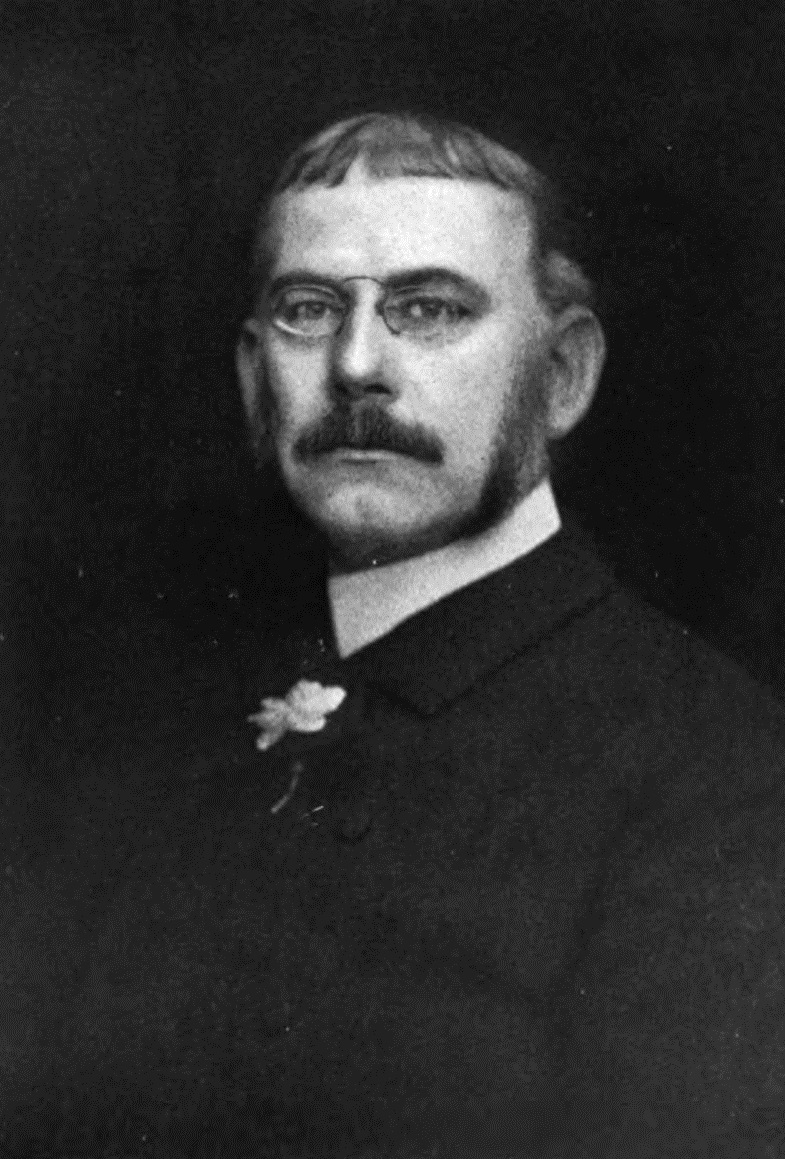
Harry Thurston Peck

Harry Thurston Peck (November 24, 1856 – March 23, 1914) was an American classical scholar, author, editor, historian and critic.

== Biography ==
Peck was born in Stamford, Connecticut. He was educated in private schools and at Columbia College, graduating in 1881, where his literary gifts attracted wide attention. His address at the conclusion of that year's commencement exercises was "witty, pathetic, and full of clever allusions" according to The New York Times. "Bouquets fell at his feet by the score as he bowed his way off the stage." As an undergraduate at Columbia College, Peck was a member of the Philolexian Society, the University's literary and debating society. Upon graduation, he immediately joined the faculty as a Latin tutor, becoming a professor in 1888. He was among several faculty members appointed to newly created chairs when he became Anthon Professor of Latin Language and Literature at the celebration of the 150th anniversary of Columbia's founding in 1904.

Peck also wrote travel guides and produced translations and works for children under a number of pseudonyms, and he was a frequent and forceful contributor to magazines and newspapers. He was editor in chief of Harpers Dictionary of Classical Antiquities and editor of the Students' Series of Latin Classics and Columbia University Studies in Classical Philology. He served as the first editor in chief of The Bookman magazine, worked on its staff from 1895 to 1906, and created America's first best-seller list for its pages in 1895. He was also editor in chief of the International Cyclopaedia from 1890 to 1901 and co-editor of the first edition of the New International Encyclopedia (1902–1904). In 1906 he published a nearly 800-page monument of progressive historiography, Twenty Years of the Republic 1885–1905, expansive, dense with detail and reference, penetrating, scathing in its revelations of actual social, economic and political conditions. It was excoriated in the metropolitan press and plainly had much to do with his later difficulties.

In 1910, various newspapers reported that Peck was being sued by a former secretary for breach of promise of marriage. The stories included alleged excerpts from his love letters to her. The romance had purportedly occurred around the time that Peck divorced his first wife and married his second. The lawsuit was eventually dismissed and the facts of the dispute were never fully established. Columbia's president Nicholas Murray Butler was a long-time friend and former schoolmate of Peck's, but he promptly terminated Peck's relationship with Columbia based on the press reports. Peck fought his dismissal without success. Various Columbia scholars tried to support Peck's right to more considerate treatment or due process, including Joel Spingarn—who was soon dismissed, as well.

Peck lived out his remaining years cut off from his former colleagues and relying on income from occasional writing assignments. He was increasingly depressed and unable to find work, and was seen one day near the end of his life on the streets of Manhattan "walking in a dazed sort of way" and "entirely oblivious to his surroundings". He died by suicide in Stamford, Connecticut, on March 23, 1914, by shooting himself in the head. He was buried in Christ Church cemetery in Greenwich, Connecticut.

== Works (partial list) ==
=== Classical ===
- The Semitic Theory of Creation (1886)
- Latin Pronunciation: A Short Exposition of the Roman Method (1890)
- Suetonius (1889)
- Roman Life in Latin Prose and Verse: Illustrative Readings from Latin Literature (1894)
- International Library of Masterpieces, Literature, Art and Rare Manuscripts (1901)
- A History of Classical Philology from the Seventh Century BC to the Twentieth Century AD (1911)

=== Edited works ===
- Harper's Dictionary of Classical Literature and Antiquities (1898)
- The International Cyclopedia (1890–1901)

=== Children's stories ===
- The Adventures of Mabel (1889)
- Hilda and the Wishes

=== Essays ===
- The Personal Equation (1899)
- What is Good English? and Other Essays (1899)
- The New Baedeker: Being Casual Notes of an Irresponsible Traveler (1910)

=== Other ===
- William Hickling Prescott (1905)
- Twenty Years of the Republic, 1885–1905 (1906)
- Studies in Several Literatures (1909)

=== Poetry ===
- Greystone and Porphyry (1899)

=== Translation ===
- Trimalchio's Dinner (1898)
