= Ian Richmond =

English archaeologist and academic

Professor Sir Ian Richmond CBE FSA FBA
- Born: 10 May 1902
- Died: 5 October 1965 (aged 63)
- Title: Professor of the Archaeology of the Roman Empire

Academic background
- Education: Ruthin School
- Alma mater: Corpus Christi College, Oxford

Academic work
- Discipline: Archaeology; Classics
- Sub-discipline: Roman Britain; Roman Empire; Classical archaeology
- Institutions: Queen's University Belfast; British School at Rome; Durham University; University of Oxford

Sir Ian Archibald Richmond, CBE, FSA, FBA (10 May 1902 – 5 October 1965) was an English archaeologist and academic. He was Professor of the Archaeology of the Roman Empire at the University of Oxford. In addition, he was Director of the British School at Rome from 1930 to 1932, President of the Society for the Promotion of Roman Studies from 1958 to 1961, and Director of the Society of Antiquaries of London from 1959 to 1964.

== Early life ==
Richmond was born on 10 May 1902 in Rochdale, Lancashire, England, alongside his twin brother. He was educated at Ruthin School, a public school in Ruthin, Denbighshire, Wales. In 1920, he began the study of classics at Corpus Christi College, Oxford. He achieved a third class in Mods in 1922 and a second class in Greats in 1924 of his Literae Humaniores degree. He spent the next two years studying at the British School at Rome.

== Academic career ==
In 1926, following his studies, Richmond joined Queen's University Belfast as a lecturer in Classical Archaeology and Ancient History. In 1930, he returned to Rome as Director of the British School. On leaving Rome in 1935, he became a lecturer in Roman-British studies at Durham University's King's College, Newcastle upon Tyne. He was promoted to Reader in 1943 and to professor in 1950. He was Public Orator for Durham University from 1949 to 1951. In 1956, he was invited to fill the new chair of the Archaeology of the Roman Empire at Oxford.

He was a prolific excavator of Romano-British sites, specialising in small-scale excavations, often just a single trench placed at a crucial point in a Roman fort which thereby established both the date and purpose of the fort. He excavated at Segontium in Caernarfon, Chester, South Shields, Lancaster, Bath, Silchester, Inveresk Roman Fort and Chedworth Roman villa. However his two major projects were at the Hod Hill Iron Age hillfort where he elucidated the Roman fort that was inserted into one corner, and then at Inchtuthil near Perth in Scotland, the legionary fortress occupied during Agricola's advance into Scotland. He also wrote a highly successful book on Roman Britain for the Penguin series.

On 25 April 1944, he was appointed a member of the Royal Commission on the Ancient and Historical Monuments of Scotland. He was also appointed a member of the Royal Commission on the Historical Monuments of England on 2 April 1946. He was a Commissioner until his death, making an important contribution to their study and record of Roman monuments.

== Death ==
Having experienced two years of minor heart troubles, Richmond died at his home in Oxford on 5 October 1965. He was 63 at the time of his sudden death. His funeral was held on 8 October 1965 at the University Church of St Mary the Virgin, Oxford.

== Personal life ==
Richmond was a devout Anglican. In 1938, he married Isabel Little. Together they had two children; one son, Hugh, and one daughter, Helen.

== Honours ==
Richmond was elected Fellow of the Society of Antiquaries of London (FSA) in 1931 and Fellow of the British Academy (FBA) in 1947. He was appointed Commander of the Order of the British Empire (CBE) in 1958. He was knighted by Queen Elizabeth II at Buckingham Palace on 22 July 1964.

== Legacy ==
The Richmond Prize is awarded every year by the Archaeology department of Newcastle University for the best performance at Stage 2, given to an undergraduate at the end of their second year.

== Publications ==
- Roman Britain (1955) Penguin.
