= Harper's Dictionary of Classical Literature and Antiquities =

Book by Harry Thurston Peck

Harper's Dictionary of Classical Literature and Antiquities is an English-language encyclopedia on subjects of classical antiquity.

== Publication history ==
It was edited by Harry Thurston Peck and published 1898 by Harper & Brothers in New York City. A 1965 reprint runs to 1,750 pages.

The dictionary's contents are now in the public domain.
