= Thomas Ashby (archaeologist) =

British archaeologist

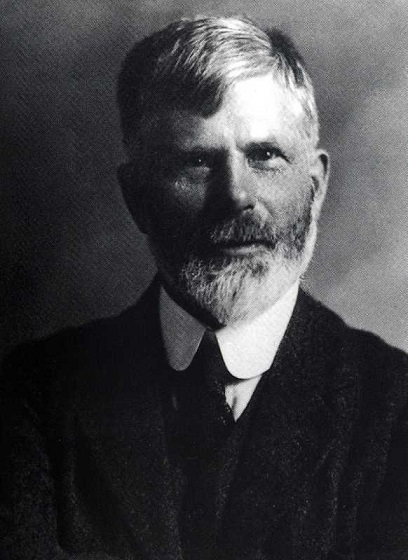
- Thomas Ashby
- Born: 14 October 1874; Ashford Road, Staines, Middlesex, England
- Died: 15 May 1931 (aged 56); London, England
- Education: Christ Church, Oxford
- Known for: Roman topography
- Scientific career
- Fields: Archaeology, Topography, Classical studies
- Workplaces: British School at Rome
- Doctoral advisor: Francis John Haverfield and John Linton Myres

Thomas Ashby, FBA, FSA (14 October 1874 – 15 May 1931) was a British archaeologist and director of the British School at Rome.

== Family ==
He was the only child of Thomas Ashby (1851–1906), and his wife, Rose Emma, daughter of Apsley Smith. His father belonged to the well-known Quaker family which owned Ashby's brewery at Staines – this became a private company in 1886.

== Appearance and manner ==
Stocky in figure, he had a tall and forceful head and a neat beard (first red and later white). His English and Italian were both equally brusque (John Ward-Perkins recalled a 'flow of impeccably idiomatic Italian spoken in an accent which to his dying day remained obstinately British'), and the Oxford Dictionary of National Biography calls him "shy with strangers, blunt with acquaintances, and devoted to his friends".

== Life ==
=== Early life ===
Ashby was educated initially at Sunningdale School, a prep school close to his childhood home. He was later an exhibitioner at Winchester College (1887–93), where he gained the lasting nickname Titus. Ashby won a scholarship at Christ Church, Oxford, studying under Francis John Haverfield and John Linton Myres, then gained a first in Classical Moderations (1895) and in literae humaniores (1897). Concentrating on Roman antiquities after 1897 (the year he was awarded a Craven fellowship), he next published his first article ('The true site of Lake Regillus', 1898), gained an Oxford degree of DLitt (1905) and won the Conington Prize for classical learning (1906).

Understanding of the city of Rome was then being transformed by a series of excavations, including renewed work on the Roman forum (started under Giacomo Boni in 1898), and Ashby wrote a regular series of reports on these developments for the Classical Review (1899–1906), The Times, the Times Literary Supplement, and the Antiquaries Journal (1921–5, 1930). (Also, in 1890, four years after the Staines brewery's privatisation, Ashby's father had settled in Rome, exploring the Campagna and becoming friends with Rodolfo Lanciani.)

=== The British School at Rome ===
==== Appointment ====
Ashby enrolled in January 1902 as the first student of the British School at Rome, under its first director Gordon McNeil Rushforth, and was the same year appointed its honorary librarian and elected as a fellow of the Society of Antiquaries. Rushforth and his successor Henry Stuart Jones both retired early due to ill health and Ashby (assistant director 1903–06) became the School's third director, until 1925. His first assistant directors were Augustus Moore Daniel (later a director of the National Gallery in London), then from 1909 Eugénie Strong – the latter appointment made Ashby's position at the school more secure and extending the School's influence in Roman society, with Eugénie in effect serving as its hostess.

Trying to make the British School at Rome a focus for archaeological research in the western Mediterranean, Ashby appointed as associate student of the BSR Duncan Mackenzie, who had just worked with Arthur Evans at Knossos. Ashby and Mackenzie presented a joint paper on the ethnology of Sardinia to the British Association for the Advancement of Science meeting in York in summer 1906 (after a joint trip there that June). This research area at the BSR dried up in 1909 when Mackenzie returned to work for the Palestine Exploration Fund in the eastern Mediterranean, though Ashby did make a return trip to Sardinia in 1912. Turning his attention to the British islands of Malta and Gozo and their possibilities for research on Mediterranean prehistory, and joined by T. Eric Peet for the 1905–6 session, Ashby visited Malta alone on various occasions in 1908 and 1909 and returned with Peet to excavate the sites of Hagiar-Kim and Mnaidra in 1910 and 1911.

==== World War I and after ====
With the support of the British ambassador Sir Rennell Rodd, the BSR decided in 1912 to relocate a new, larger, permanent building in the Valle Giulia, designed by Lutyens, and to expand into not only archaeology but also art and architecture. The move itself occurred in 1915 saw the actual move, and Ashby's volunteering not to fight in the First World War but instead to serve as a translator in the first British Red Cross ambulance unit, based at the Villa Trento near Udine, leaving Mrs Strong to run the School. Ashby felt this appropriate to his Quaker leanings and, though it drew criticism, he was still asked to return to Rome and the BSR, and was mentioned in dispatches for his bravery in his ambulance work on the Asiago plateau.

Moving to the British Red Cross headquarters in Genoa from late 1917 to spring 1918 after the Italian defeat at the battle of Caporetto, Ashby then moved to Rome as an education officer (lecturing on ancient Rome to the troops), and only resumed his role as director of the school in spring 1919. On his return, he and Strong had immediately to restart the school's work on the sculpture catalogue which Stuart Jones had begun, though Ashby still managed to return to Malta in March 1921 to work with Themistocles Zammit at Hal-Tarxien (in work published in the Antiquaries Journal (1924) and to continue his interest in prehistory by collaborating with Peet and H. Thurlow Leeds on an essay on the western Mediterranean for The Cambridge Ancient History (1924).

On his return from Malta in spring 1921, Ashby met Caroline May, eldest daughter of the civil engineer Richard Price-Williams and cousin of Walter Ashburner (an old friend of Ashby's with links to the British Institute of Florence), working in the school library. The couple married on 20 July 1921 and, though they had no children, Caroline began to take over Strong's role as hostess at the school, straining relations between them. In 1924 the BSR executive committee decided to only renew Strong's and Ashby's appointments until 1925, when Mrs Strong would reach retirement age at sixty-five. General shock greeted the decision, with Rennell Rodd writing in late November 1924:

"almost everyone I meet deplores the decision … In spite of Ashby's eccentricities he had the regard of all the Italian archaeologists and they are all very much upset at his going. In his own particular line he is considered one of the greatest authorities and his collections and maps which have been at the disposal of students are almost unique in their way. "

=== Retirement and death ===
Ashby settled in Rome after his enforced retirement and set to work completing "Some Italian scenes and festivals" (1929, a work dedicated to his wife, which also appeared in 1995 in a revised edition as "Sagre e feste d'Abruzzo"), a revision of the second part of W. J. Anderson and R. P. Spiers's 1902 "The architecture of Greece and Rome" (1927), and a revised edition of Samuel B. Platner's "Topographical dictionary of ancient Rome" (1929). He also carried out lecture tours of Australia (having first visited in 1914) and – in 1926 – he embarked of North America (the latter in conjunction with the Archaeological Institute of America).

Ashby's health seems to have declined in this period, including deteriorating eyesight. Elected in 1930 to a senior research studentship at Christ Church, Oxford, he returned to England to fulfil the post's residence requirements. However, on his way to Oxford on the morning of 15 May 1931, he fell from the Southampton to Waterloo train between New Malden and Raynes Park, Surrey. An enlarged brain tumour was revealed in the post-mortem. Despite suspicions of suicide, an open verdict was recorded. Ashby was cremated, with his ashes interred at St Margaret's Bay in Kent (R. R. Campbell stated that Ashby "was almost as fond [of St Margaret's] as of his own beloved Rome").

== Studies ==
=== Topography ===
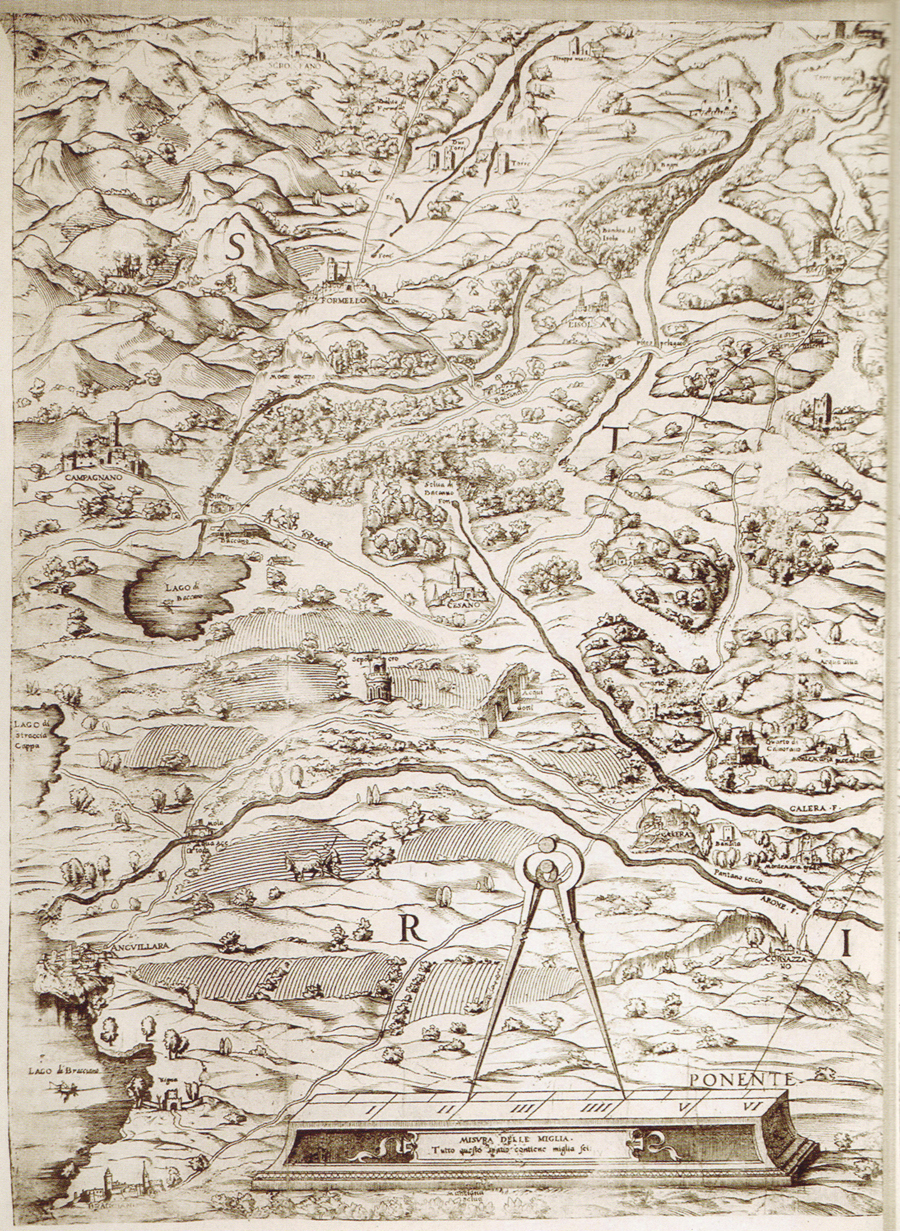
Campagnano mappa 1547

Excavation in Italy, in the post-Risorgimento period of the 1910s, was limited to Italians and disallowed to foreigners, leading to their concentration on topographical and museum studies. Ashby was no exception, producing a series of detailed topographical studies of Italy's Roman roads, later collated in the valuable work The Roman Campagna in classical times (1927, republished in 1970 with an Italian edition in 1982), and studies on the aqueducts in the city of Rome, the first of which was published in the Classical Review in 1900. (After his retirement, he also produced The aqueducts of ancient Rome, published posthumously in 1935 under Ian Richmond's guidance). Indeed, Ashby grew into a master of Rome's urban topography, working from both classical and early modern literature and prints, and drawing on (among other things) Antonio Labacco's 16th century architectural drawings, Eufrosino della Volpaia's 1547 map of the Campagna, Étienne du Pérac's 1581 topographical studies, Giovanni Battista de'Cavalieri's "Antiquae statuae urbis Romae", and the art collections at Windsor Castle, the Sir John Soane Museum, and Eton College.

=== Caerwent ===
Haverfield also encouraged and supported Ashby in gaining excavation experience at the Roman town of Caerwent in south Wales as part of the Caerwent Exploration Fund (1899–1910, 1913), presided over by Lord Tredegar and initiated by the Clifton Antiquarian Club. Ashby, Alfred E. Hudd and A. Trice Martin, an assistant master at Clifton College, all worked on the project, with Ashby contributing to the annual reports published in Archaeologia (1901–7, 1909–11).

== Memberships ==
Ashby was a member of the German Archaeological Institute (1913), of the Pontificia Accademia Romana d'Archeologia (1914); a foreign member of the Reale Accademia dei Lincei (1918); an honorary associate of the Royal Institute of British Architects (1922); an honorary member of the Reale Accademia di San Luca (1925); and a fellow of the Reale Società Romana di Storia Patria (1923), and of the British Academy (1927).
