= Samuel Ball Platner =

American archaeologist (1863–1921)

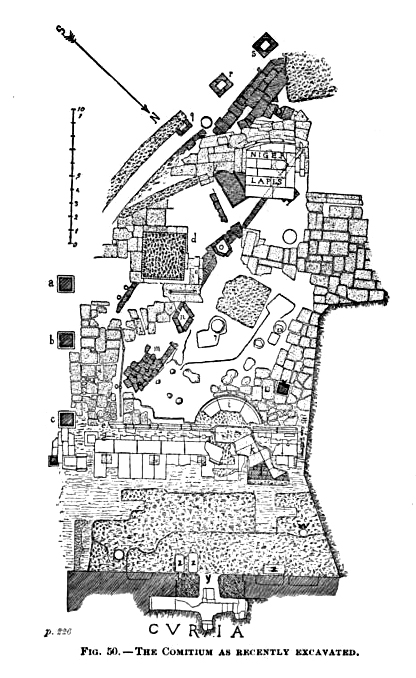
The Comitium as recently excavated

Samuel Ball Platner (December 4, 1863 – August 20, 1921) was an American classicist and archaeologist.

Platner was born at Unionville, Connecticut, and educated at Yale College. He taught at Western Reserve University and is best known as the author of various topographical works on ancient Rome, chief among them A Topographical Dictionary of Ancient Rome, completed after Platner's death by Thomas Ashby and published in 1929; and as a contributor to the 1911 Britannica.

== Bibliography ==
- The topography and monuments of ancient Rome (1st ed. 1904; 2nd rev ed. 1911; Boston, Allyn & Bacon).
