= Tomb of the Haterii =

Roman funerary monument

- Tomba degli Haterii (Italian)
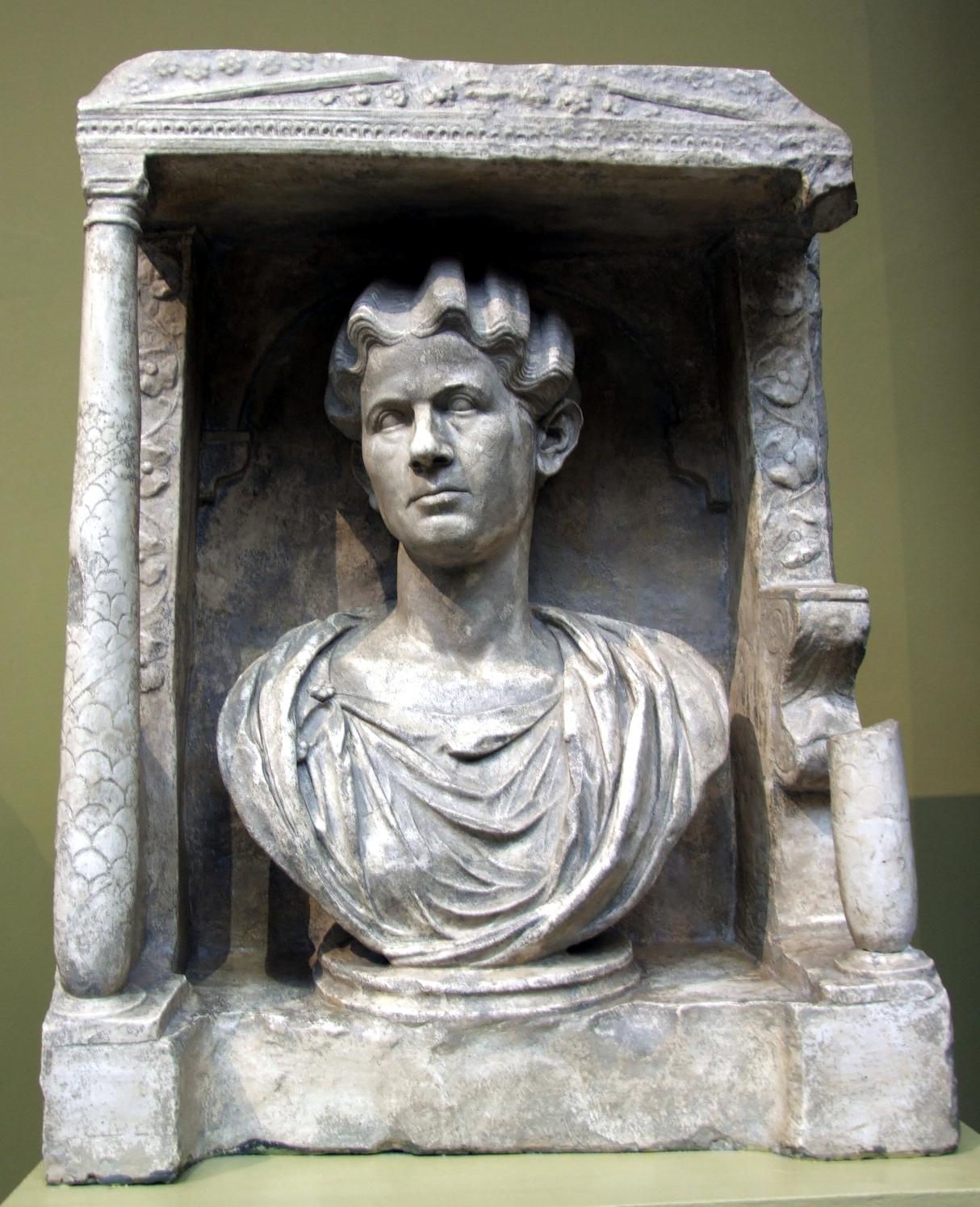
- Plaster cast of a bust from the aedicula of the tomb, possibly the Hateria named in the founding inscription.

- Approximate location of the Tomb of the Haterii in Rome
- 41.873370°N 12.570647°E
- Periods: Roman Empire
- Cultures: Ancient Rome
- Location: Rome, Italy

History
- Built: c. 100 – c. 120 CE

Site notes
- Excavation dates: 1848, 1970

The Tomb of the Haterii is an ancient Roman funerary monument, constructed between c. 100 and c. 120 CE along the Via Labicana to the south-east of Rome. It was discovered in 1848 and is particularly noted for the numerous artworks, particularly reliefs, found within.

The tomb was primarily dedicated to Hateria, a freedwoman and priestess, and her husband Quintus Haterius, who was involved in the construction of public monuments. Artworks from the tomb show some of these monuments, including the Colosseum and an archway generally identified as the Arch of Titus; another of the tomb's sculptures shows a funerary scene featuring Hateria, one of few surviving depictions of collocatio (lying in repose) from the Roman world. Inscriptions found within the tomb also commemorate four of the couple's children, as well as other members of their gens.

The tomb was rebuilt at least once following the end of the Roman period. It was originally rediscovered in 1848, and partially excavated, with many of its sculptures removed and put on display in the Vatican Museums. Its location was subsequently forgotten until 1970, when a further round of excavations uncovered more of the tomb's lower storey, as well as further works of sculpture.

== The gens Hateria ==
The gens Hateria was a Roman plebeian family. Originally enslaved, they became notable from the later 1st century BCE: the Roman statesman Cicero mentions a jurist of the gens in a letter of 46 BCE, and another is mentioned as a victim of the proscriptions of 43 BCE.

The fragmentary titulus (founding inscription) names Quintus Haterius, of uncertain cognomen, and his wife Hateria as the founders of the tomb. The inscription indicates that at least Hateria was a former slave, and that Haterius was either a former slave of the same household or the former master of Hateria, who freed her in order to marry her. The titulus also dedicates the tomb to Quintus Haterius Rufio, either a close relative or former owner of Haterius and Hateria. (Note: Trimble 2018, p. 334. The reconstruction of the relevant parts of the titulus is uncertain.) A now-lost relief within the tomb gave Hateria the additional name of Helpis.

Smaller inscriptions beneath the titulus commemorate Quintus Haterius Rufinus and Quintus Haterius Anicetus, sons of Quintus, and two daughters, Hateria Magna and Hateria Quintilla, who are recorded as having died before marriage. (Note: Corpus Inscriptionum Latinarum 6.19148-150. The two Hateriae are named as virgines raptae.) All four children's names are recorded with filiations, indicating that they were born free, and so after Hateria's manumission. Other inscriptions found in the tomb mention Quintus Haterius Antigonus and Hateria Supera, who died at the age of five. (Note: Corpus Inscriptionum Latinarum 6.19148-150)

The Italian archaeologist Filippo Coarelli has argued for an identification between the Quintus Haterius of the founding inscription and Quintus Haterius Tychichus, a freedman and redemptor (building contractor) known from another inscription. (Note: CIL VI, 607) However, since the cognomen of the tomb's founder has been lost from the titulus, the identification cannot be securely proven, though several of the reliefs allude to the deceased's involvement in public building.

The tomb is not associated with the orator Quintus Haterius, also of the gens Hateria, who died in 26 BCE: his tomb, consisting of a funerary altar covered in travertine and decorated with marble, was near the Porta Nomentana. (Note: CIL VI, 1426; Richardson 1992, p. 356) The German archaeologist Barbara Borg has, however, suggested that the Haterii of this tomb were freedmen of Quintus Haterius's grandson, Quintus Haterius Antoninus, which gave them a close relationship with the imperial family. They may have been involved in the construction of the Templum Gentis Flaviae, constructed by Domitian, which seems to have served as an inspiration for the construction of temple-shaped tombs such as that of the Haterii.

== Tomb ==
Plan of the tomb's lower storey, in relation to the hypothetical route of the Via Labicana

The tomb was heavily damaged at the time of rediscovery. It was a mausoleum in the approximate shape of a temple, standing on two storeys, the upper of which was originally accessed by a staircase. The tomb is located approximately 8.4 kilometres (5.2 mi) south-east of Rome, along the route of the ancient Via Labicana between the city and the town of Labici.

The tomb was decorated with various marble reliefs. The part of the lower storey excavated in 1970 consisted of a semi-interred burial chamber measuring 3.5 × 3.5 m. This chamber, which was originally accessible from ground level, included marble flooring, marble cladding on the walls, and marble mouldings at their base. Originally, the tomb included a garden, in which were found a puteal and a sculpture of a cow. The garden is believed to have been the original location of a statue of Silvanus, with an inscription declaring that Quintus Haterius Anicetus and his brother Crescens had dedicated it in fulfilment of a vow, parts of which were found to the south of the tomb in 1970. Mayer has suggested that this garden originally included an altar dedicated to Dis Pater, a Roman god of the dead.

No direct evidence of burials was found in the tomb, particularly graves or sarcophagi, leading to the conclusion that the burials here were cremation burials placed into urns which are now mostly lost. During either late antiquity or the Medieval period, the tomb was rebuilt at least once.

== Artworks ==
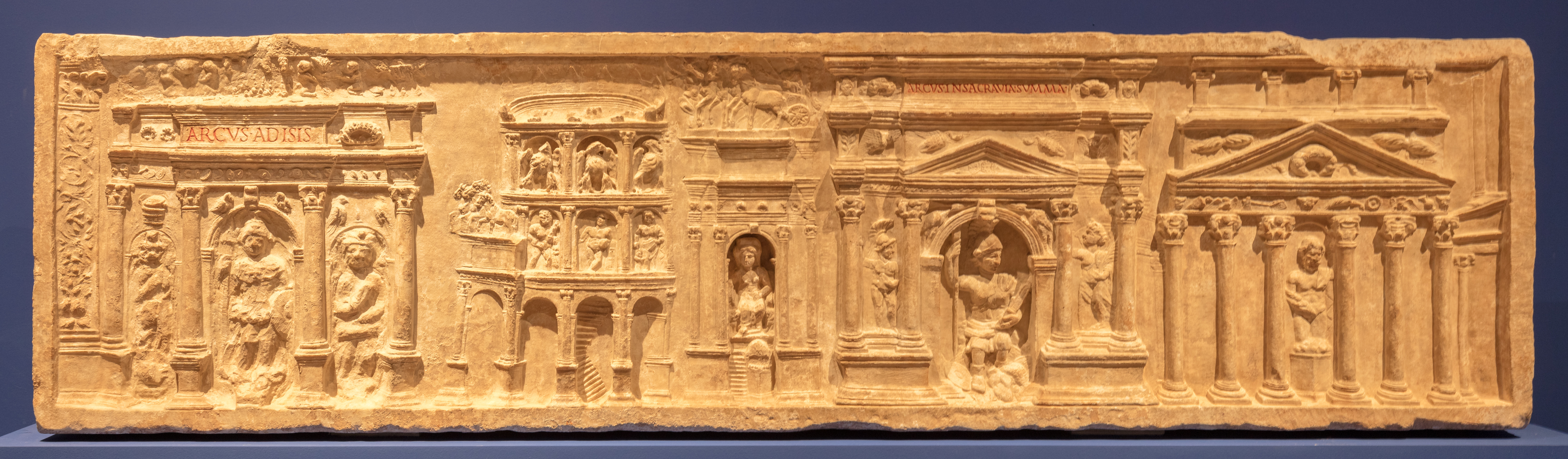
The monument relief from the Tomb of the Haterii

One of the reliefs associated with the tomb consists of an elongated rectangular space showing a series of five buildings, identified by inscriptions, generally believed to represent public monuments on which the founding Quintus Haterius had worked. The monuments are, from left to right:

- Arcus ad Isis ('Arch at [the temple of] Isis'), generally interpreted as either part of or near the Temple of Isis and Serapis on the Campus Martius.
- The Colosseum (at this stage, without the attic above the three tiers of arches).
- An arch without an inscription.
- Arcus in sacra via summa ('Arch at the top of the Via Sacra'), generally identified with the Arch of Titus.
- A hexastyle temple (with six columns) and with a pediment surmounted by an attic, dedicated to Jupiter. This may be either the Temple of Jupiter Tonans on the Capitoline Hill or the Temple of Jupiter Stator on the Palatine.

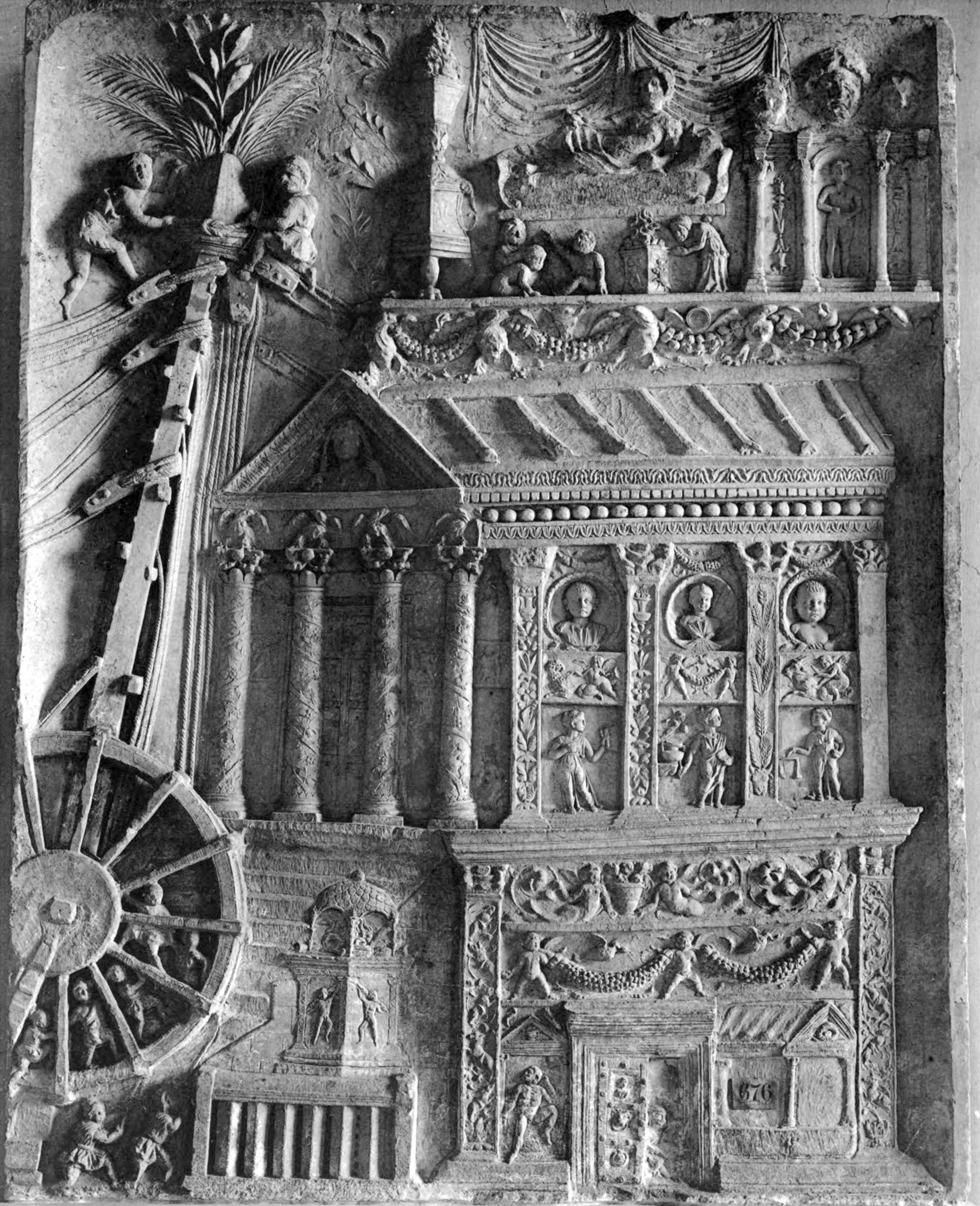
The Tomb-Crane Relief, showing the construction of an elaborate tomb of a similar style to that of the Haterii

A second relief, known as the Tomb-Crane Relief, shows the construction of a temple-shaped funerary monument, with sculptural busts in niches along the outside and reliefs covering the walls. A deceased man appears on a couch above the temple, already in the afterlife. While the tomb shown in this relief is larger than the Tomb of the Haterii, and the decoration does not match that found within the tomb, it has been taken as a "heightened, elaborated vision" of the tomb or of its type. The relief has been used as evidence that the Haterii of the tomb had acquired their wealth as building contractors.

A third relief, a funerary scene, is one of the few extant depictions of a collocatio (lying in repose) known from the Roman world. It shows a deceased woman lying on a bed, in the atrium of a house, surrounded by four candelabra with burning flames and a small flaming vessel, possibly an acerra used to burn incense. On the far side of the bed stand two women with unbound hair beating their breasts, perhaps professional mourners known as praeficae; next to them is a man preparing to lay a garland on the body. On the near side are four other mourning figures, either family members or slaves. At the foot of the bed is a woman playing the flute. Several newly-liberated freedmen wearing the pileus, similar to those working in the crane relief, are also present. The British archaeologist Jocelyn Toynbee suggested that these freedmen represent those manumitted in Hateria's will, which may have been represented by writing-tablets shown at the woman's feet; a small scene in the upper right of the collocatio relief shows the writing of this will. The prominent position of women in the relief has been taken as evidence for "the predominance of women in mourning ritual" among the Romans.

Another relief shows a pillar (baluster) with rose-plants climbing up it. This motif is often found in sacred contexts, and has been taken as a reminder of the Rosalia, an annual festival from May to July in which Romans would dedicate their family's tombs with roses, and hold banquets in the tomb gardens. A further now-lost relief, showing a priestess of Dis Pater by the name Hateria, is generally considered to have come from the tomb and to be identified with the Hateria mentioned in the titulus.

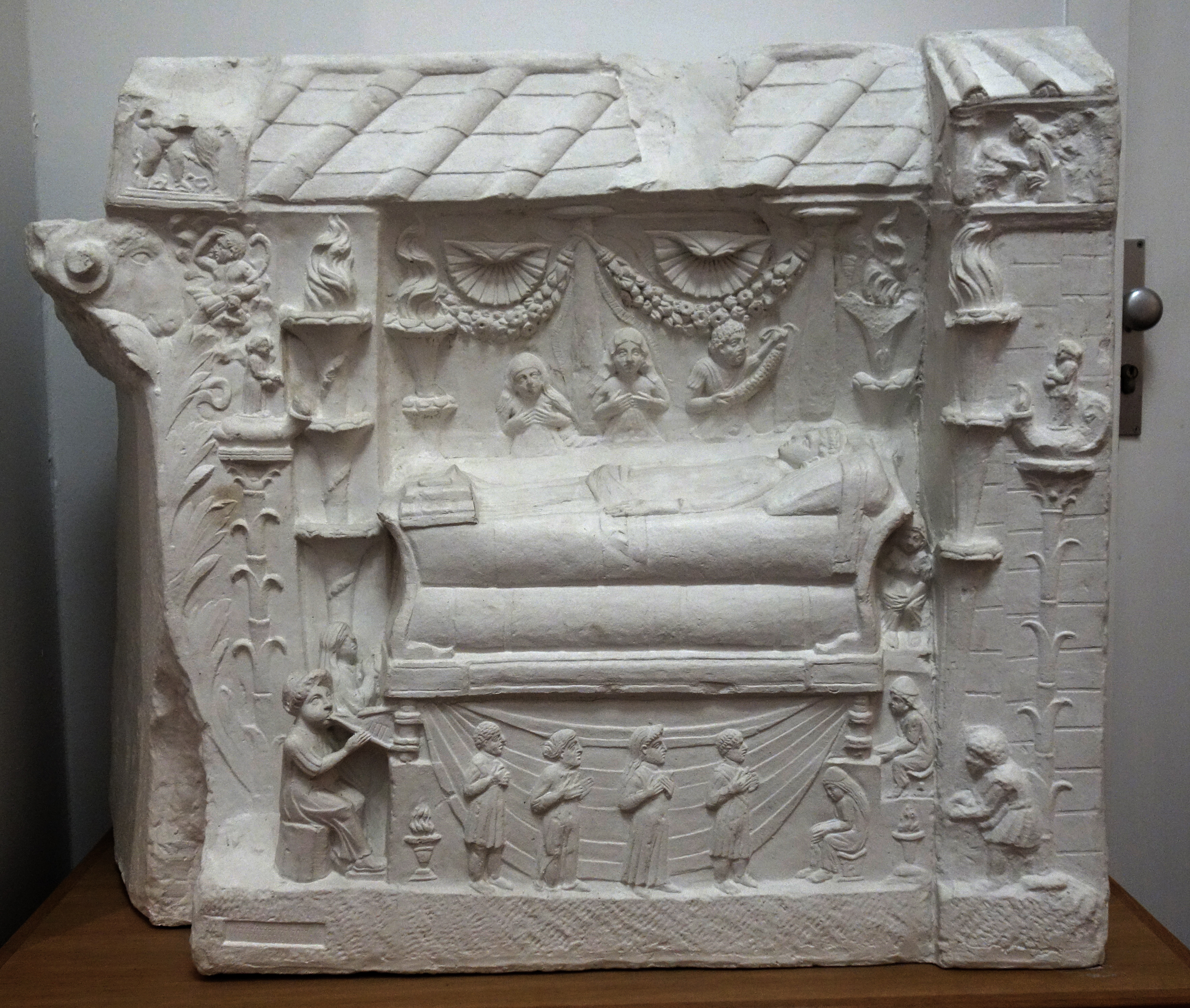
Plaster cast of the collocatio relief

Alongside the reliefs, two portraits inside a brick aedicula were found, along with an architrave with the busts of Mercury, Ceres, Proserpina and Pluto. These figures have been interpreted as equivalent to the Theoi Megaloi worshipped by the mystery cult of Samothrace, and in turn as tentative evidence for the spread of this cult to Rome. Another sculpture shows a child in the pose of Hercules, while a nude portrait of Venus has been interpreted as a portrait, perhaps of Hateria. The myth of Proserpina was alluded to in another relief from the tomb, showing her rape by Pluto, perhaps intended to allude to the deaths of Hateria's daughters.

Other artworks perhaps associated with the tomb include a cinerary urn with a marine scene, a small pillar and a jamb decorated with vine shoots and grape harvest scenes, and another small pillar decorated on two sides by a candlestick adorned with roses and birds. (Note: They are included in Jensen 1978, though Trimble does not consider them to have come from the tomb.) One cinerarium from the tomb shows the heads of two bulls eating grapes, as well as a mussel-shell pouring forth a pool of water, in which various marine creatures such as fish, water-birds and dolphins are swimming. Toynbee suggests that this imagery represents the refreshment awaiting the deceased in the afterlife.

The artworks of the Tomb of the Haterii have been interpreted as showing "the continuity of traditional Italic sculptural subjects and conventions". In particular, the collocatio relief is the only known example of its kind from Roman art, but follows precedents established in Greek, Lucanian and Etruscan sculpture. In artistic style, the relief follows the Italic convention of portraying more significant figures, particularly the deceased, as physically larger, while the relief's parallel depiction of numerous episodes from the deceased's life also has precedents in non-Roman Italic art.

== Excavations ==
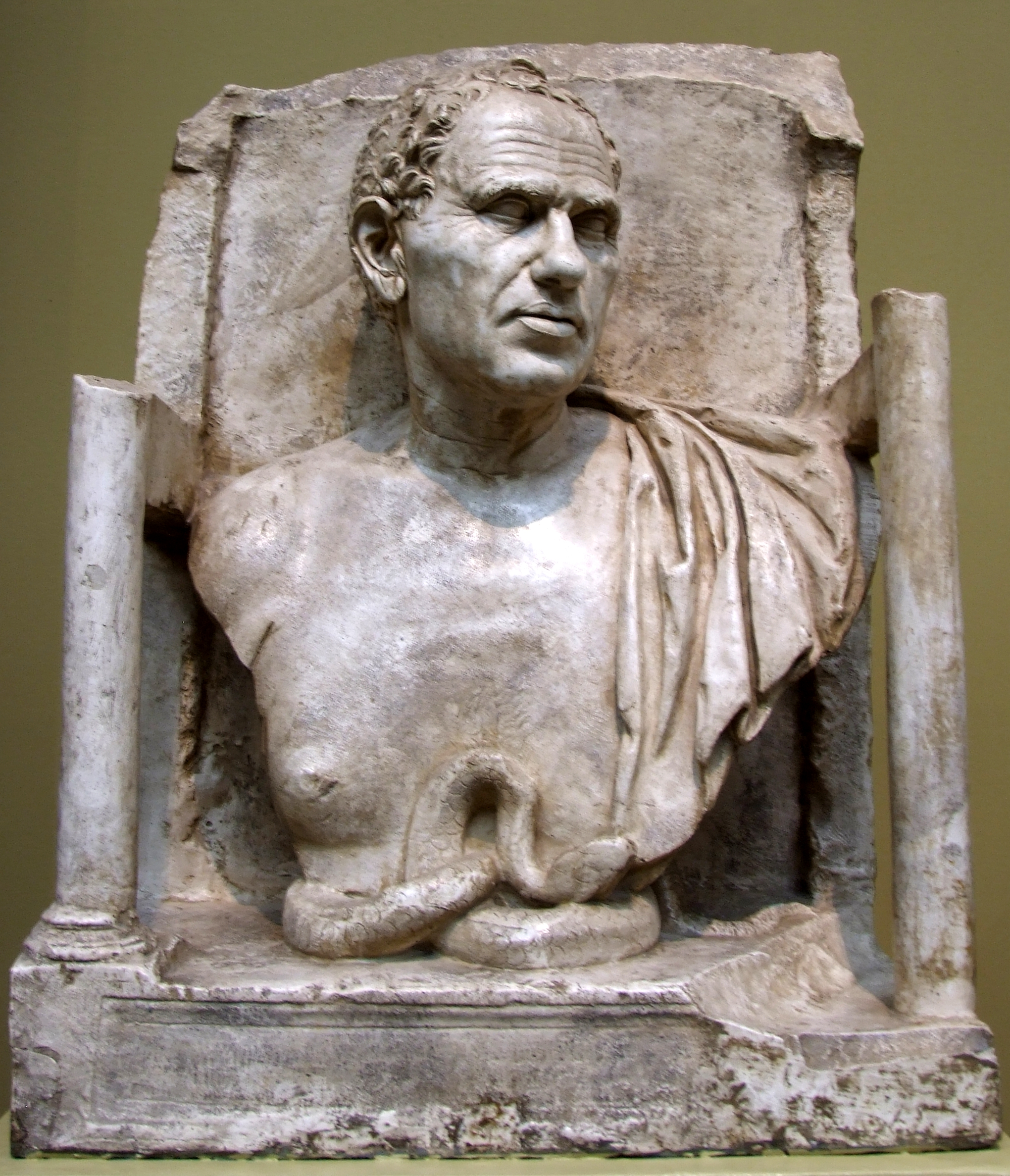
Cast of a male bust from the Tomb of the Haterii, identified as Quintus Haterius or his patron or ancestor

The tomb was first discovered during roadworks in 1848. At this point, an ancient wall and several pieces of sculpture, including the crane relief, were discovered, with at least some of the reliefs still in situ. During the Risorgimento, excavation on the tomb ceased, and its location was lost, with no detailed records having been made of the excavations to date or the find-spots of the material.

Most of the sculptures discovered in the initial excavation were sold to the Vatican in 1853. They were displayed in the Lateran Museum until the 1960s, and after its closure were moved to the Museo Gregorio Profano in the Vatican Museums.

The tomb was rediscovered in 1970, during further roadworks, and excavated over three days. During this excavation, part of the lower storey was uncovered as well as additional sculptural finds, including the titulus.

== Bibliography ==
- Borg, Barbara E. (2019). Roman Tombs and the Art of Commemoration: Contextual Approaches to Funerary Customs in the Second Century CE. Cambridge University Press. doi:10.1017/9781108690904. ISBN 9781108690904. S2CID 166623582.
- Coarelli, Filippo (1979). "'La riscoperta del sepolcro degli Haterii: una base con dedica a Silvano'". In Kopke, Günter; Moore, Mary B. (eds.). Studies in Classical Art and Archaeology: A tribute to P.H. Von Blanckenhangen (in Italian). New York: Locust Valley. pp. 255–269.
- Corbeill, Anthony (2018). Nature Embodied: Gesture in Ancient Rome. Princeton University Press. ISBN 9780691187808.
- Gerding, Henrik (2002). The tomb of Caecilia Metella: Tumulus, Tropaeum and Thymele (PDF). Lund University Press. ISBN 91-628-5342-2. Archived from the original (PDF) on 2023-01-29.
- Jensen, William Michael (1978). The Sculptures from the tomb of the Haterii (Ph.D.). University of Michigan.
- Gros, Pierre (1997). "Iuppiter Invictus". In Steinby, Eva Margareta (ed.). Lexicon Topographicum Urbis Romae (in Italian). Vol. 3. Rome: Edizioni Quazar. pp. 159–160. ISBN 9788871400969.
- Helbig, Wolfgang (1963). Speier, Hermine (ed.). Führer durch die öffentlichen Sammlungen klassischer Altertümer in Rom. Vol. 1 (4 ed.). Tübingen: Ernst Wasmuth Verlag. pp. 773–781. (Erika Simon).
- Lancaster, Lynne C. (2005). Concrete Vaulted Construction in Imperial Rome: Innovations in Context. Cambridge University Press. doi:10.1017/CBO9780511610516. ISBN 9780511610516.
- Mayer, Emanuel (2012). The Ancient Middle Classes. Cambridge, MA: Harvard University Press. ISBN 9780674065345.
- Meinecke, Katharina (2013). "Funerary Cult at Sarcophagi, Rome and Vicinity". Iconographie funéraire romaine et société: Corpus antique, approches nouvelles?. Perpignan: Presses universitaires de Perpignan. pp. 31–49. doi:10.4000/books.pupvd.7078. ISBN 9782354124212. Archived from the original on 2023-01-29.
- Richardson, Lawrence (1992). A New Topographical Dictionary of Ancient Rome. London: Johns Hopkins University Press. ISBN 0-8018-4300-6.
- Rushforth, G. McN. (1915). "Funeral lights in Roman sepulchral monuments". Journal of Roman Studies. 5: 149–164. doi:10.2307/296303. JSTOR 296303. S2CID 163135826.
- Sinn, F.; Freyberger, K. S. (1996). Die Grabdenkmäler II: Die Ausstattung des Hateriergrabes (Vatikanische Museen, Museo Gregoriano Profano ex Lateranense: Katalog der Skulpturen, vol. I.2) (in German). Mainz: Von Zabern.
- Stambaugh, John E. (1988). The Ancient Roman City. Baltimore: Johns Hopkins University Press. ISBN 9780801836923.
- Toynbee, Jocelyn M.C.M. (1996) [1976]. Death and Burial in the Roman World. Baltimore: Johns Hopkins University Press. ISBN 978-0801855078.
- Trimble, Jennifer (2018). "Figure and ornament, death and transformation in the Tomb of the Haterii". In Dietrich, Nikolaus; Squire, Michael (eds.). Ornament and Figure in Graeco-Roman Art: Rethinking Visual Ontologies in Classical Antiquity. Berlin: Walter de Gruyter. pp. 327–352.
- Tuck, Steven L. (2021). A History of Roman Art. Oxford: Wiley. ISBN 9781119653288.
- Zanker, Paul; Ewald, Bjorn C. (2012). Living with Myths: The Imagery of Roman Sarcophagi. Oxford University Press. ISBN 9780199228690.
