= Ptolemaeus Chennus =

Alexandrine grammarian (2nd century CE)

Ptolemy Chennus or Chennos ("quail") (Koine Greek: Πτολεμαῖος Χέννος Ptolemaios Chennos), was an Alexandrine grammarian during the reigns of Trajan and Hadrian.

According to the Suda, he was the author of an historical drama named Sphinx, of an epic, Anthomeros, in 24 books (both lost) and a Strange History. The last is probably identical with the New History in six books ascribed by Photius to Ptolemy Hephaestion, of which a summary outline has been preserved in Photius' Biblioteca (cod. 190), who observed sarcastically of its credulous author that he found it "a work really useful for those who undertake to attempt erudition in history," for "it abounds in extraordinary and badly imagined information." Photius goes on to say, "In any case, the majority of his stories which are free of things impossible to believe, offer a knowledge above the ordinary, but which is not unpleasing."

It was dedicated to the author's lady, Tertulla, and contained a medley of all sorts of legends and fables belonging to both the mythological and historical periods. An identification with Ptolemy-el-Garib has been suggested, but this is no longer accepted.

See editions of Photius's abridgment by Joseph-Emmanuel-Ghislain Roulez (Ptolemaei Hephaestionis Novarum historiarum ad variam eruditionem pertinentium excerpta e Photio, 1834); and in Anton Westermann, Mythographi graeci (1843); Rudolf Hercher, Über die Glaubwürdigkeit der neuen Geschichte des Ptolemaus Chennus (Leipzig, 1856); John Edwin Sandys, History of Classical Scholarship (2nd ed., 1906).
