= Rudolf Hercher =

German classical scholar (1821–1878)

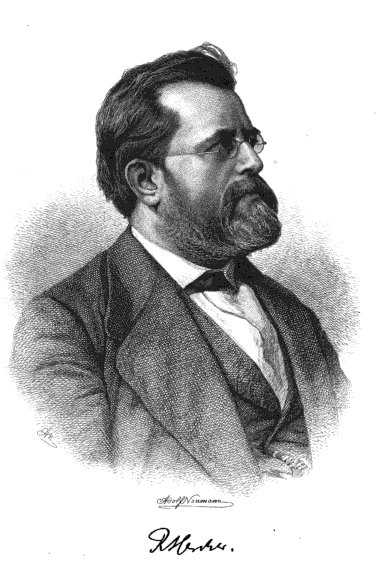
Rudolf Hercher

Rudolf Hercher (Latin: Rudolphus Hercher; 11 January 1821 – 26 March 1878) was a German classical philologist, who worked as a grammar school teacher in Rudolstadt (1847–1859) and Berlin (1861–1878). He is especially known for his textual criticism of diverse Greek authors and was considered the successor of Anton Westermann. He opposed the theories of William Gell that the events described in Greek epics, such as the Odyssey, were true historical events.

== Life ==
Rudolf Hercher was born in Rudolstadt to the grammar schoolmaster and later financial advisor Johann Andreas Hercher. He attended grammar school in his home city from 1830 until 1838, where he especially came under the influence of the Latin teacher Lobegott Samuel Obbarius and of the Greek teacher Christian Lorenz Sommer. Before tertiary education, he deepened his education even further, according to his father's wish with a year in the senior class of the Grammar school. He particularly focussed further on German literature, drawing, and English. In the Summer semester of 1839, Hercher moved to Leipzig University, where he studied for three years alongside Gottfried Hermann and Moriz Haupt. In 1842 he went for two further semesters at Humboldt University of Berlin, where the celebrated textual critic, Karl Lachmann instructed him. After gaining his doctorate at Friedrich Schiller University of Jena (1844) Hercher became house teacher to Hartwig Julius Ludwig von Both, member of the Oldenburg bundestag, later in the same year. After a year, he quit this position and traveled for many months to relatives in Manchester and London; after a short stay in Rudolstadt, he worked from Easter till Autumn 1846 as house teacher to an Irish family in Dublin. Subsequently, he travelled for a month in London and in the Netherlands.

After his summer teaching position of 1846 was over, Hercher was offered a position as a Collaborator at the Grammar school in Rudolstadt in December of the same year, which he took up in 1847. After seven years of employment he became a schoolmaster in 1854. In the following years, Hercher repeatedly received the opportunity to go on long sabbaticals: He spent further months in Paris and went to Italy for a year in 1859; this stay was extended for a further year because of an eye illness. He owed a call to the local Joachimsthalsches Gymnasium in Berlin to his friendship with Immanuel Bekker and Gustav Parthey (1798–1872), which he took up in Autumn of 1861. Soon thereafter he was enrolled as a Member of the German Archaeological Institute in Rome, entering its central governance in 1865. He undertook further sabbaticals to Ithaca and Corfu (1863) and to Paris (1867).

In Berlin, Hercher interacted with the leading ancient scholars, including Moriz Haupt, Immanuel Bekker, and August Meineke; with Theodor Mommsen and Adolf Kirchhoff he founded the journal Hermes: Zeitschrift für classische Philologie (Hermes: Journal of Classical Philology) in 1866, which continues to this day. The interaction with his colleagues was so important to Hercher, that he rejected three job offers from foreign universities. On 14 July 1873 he was enrolled as an ordinary member in the Prussian Academy of Sciences, on 19 December 1875 as a corresponding member in the St. Petersburg Academy of Sciences.

In his later years, Hercher came to suffer from neurasthenia, which developed into a serious affliction at the beginning of 1878. On 26 March of that year he died in Berlin after a brain haemorrhage, aged 58.

== Works ==
Rudolf Hercher is especially known for his works on textual reconstruction. He mainly worked with Greek prose authors of the post-classical period, but also strayed into Homer, Herodotus and Latin authors. His first publication was a critical edition of the work On the Names of Rivers and Mountains (περὶ ποταμῶν καὶ ὀρῶν ἐπωνυμίας), in which he not only produced the text, but also established that the work's attribution to Plutarch was incorrect. He focussed on Arrian's On Hunting (De Venatione), Michael Psellos, Nikephoros Gregoras, the Dreambook of Achmet, Ptolemaios Chennos and Philo of Byzantium.

Especially his edition of the erotic authors (Erotici Graeci, two volumes, Leipzig 1858–1859), his first edition Astrampsychi oraculorum decades (Berlin 1863), his two volume edition of Aelian (Leipzig 1864–1866) and the Epistolographi Graeci (Paris 1873) attracted attention. In his edition of Aineias Taktikos (Berlin 1870) it first occurred to him, to restore the text which was distorted by many interpolations and to stress the Atticising style of the Late Antique prose author. Of his edition of Plutarch's Moralia, only one volume appeared (Leipzig 1872).

As well as these and other monographs, Hercher wrote hundreds of shorter articles on textual criticism and exegesis. He especially discussed the Homeric Epics often. After his death, Carl Robert's archaeology and philology division published these papers under the title Homerische Aufsätze von Rudolf Hercher (Berlin 1881).

=== List of works ===
- On the Names of Rivers and Mountains
- Arriani Nicomediensis Scripta Minora (1854)
- Erotici Graeci, two volumes, (Leipzig 1858–1859)
- Aelian (1858)
- Astrampsychi oraculorum decades (Berlin 1863)
- Aineias Taktikos (Berlin 1870)
- Plutach's Moralia, only one volume appeared (Leipzig 1872)
- Epistolographi Graeci (Paris, 1873)
- Homerische Aufsätze (Berlin, 1881)
