= Hans Herter =

Hans Herter (8 June 1899 – 7 November 1984) was a German Classical philologist who was for many years Director of the Rheinischen Museum für Philologie, Bonn. His main interests lay in the works of Thucydides and Plato. Among his prominent students is Heinz-Günther Nesselrath.

== Sources ==
- Rainer Lengeler, Ernst Vogt and Heinz Gerd Ingenkamp, eds. In memoriam Hans Herter. Reden gehalten am 3. Mai 1985 bei der Gedenkfeier der Philosophischen Fakultät der Rheinischen Friedrich-Wilhelms-Universität Bonn, Bonn 1986. ISBN 3-416-09158-2
- Carl Werner Müller. "Nachruf auf Hans Herter", in: Rheinisches Museum für Philologie 128, (1985:3-4).
- Ernst Vogt: Bibliographie Hans Herter. Zum 65. Geburtstag am 8. Juni 1964, Bonn 1964.
