= Babler =

Babler is a surname. Notable people with the surname include:

- Andreas Babler (born 1973), Austrian politician
- Balbina Bäbler (born 1967), Swiss archaeologist
- Edmund A. Babler (1874 – c. 1929), American surgeon, namesake of Babler State Park, Missouri, United States
- James H. Babler, namesake of Babler oxidation
