= Hermes (classical philology journal) =

German academic journal

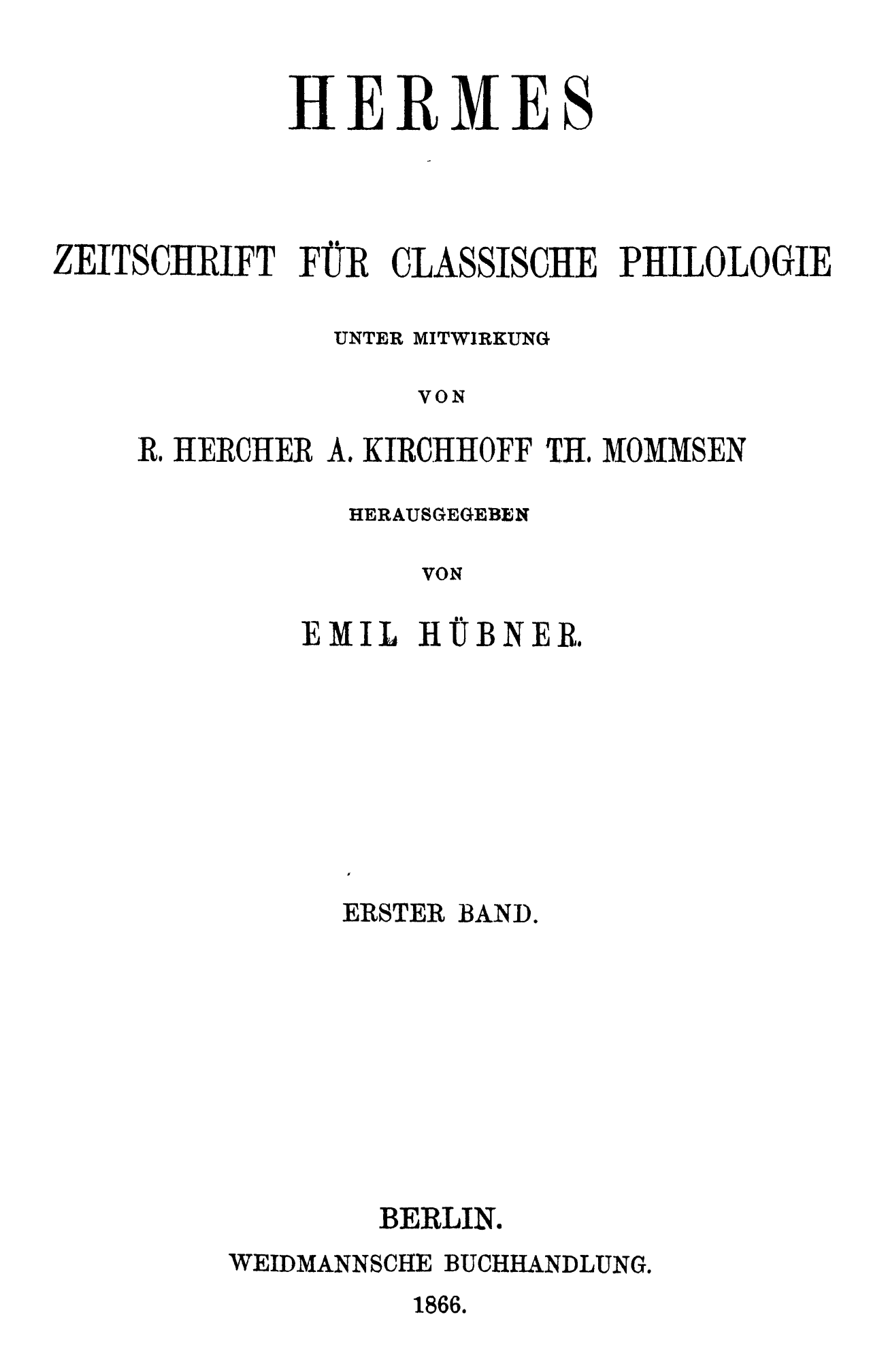
- Title page
- Discipline: Classical philology
- Language: German, English, French, Italian
- Edited by: Hans Beck; Martin Hose; Claudia Schindler

Publication details
- History: 1866–present
- Publisher: Franz Steiner Verlag
- Frequency: Quarterly

Standard abbreviations
- ISO 4: Hermes

Indexing
- ISSN: 0018-0777 (print); 2365-3116 (web)

Links
- Journal homepage; Online archive (JSTOR)

Hermes (full title: Hermes: Zeitschrift für classische Philologie; Hermes: Bulletin for Classical Philology) is a German periodical specialising in classical studies. Originally published by the Berlin publisher Weidmann, it is now published by Franz Steiner Verlag.

Its founding in 1866 was led by the ancient historian Theodor Mommsen, who co-founded the publication with Adolf Kirchhoff and Rudolf Hercher. Its first editor, from 1866 until 1881, was the philologist Emil Hübner: most of its early contributors, including Hübner, were pupils of the Plautine scholar Friedrich Wilhelm Ritschl. As of 2024, it is edited by Hans Beck, Martin Hose and Claudia Schindler.

On its release, the German scholar Wilhelm Wagner praised Hermes as a worthy rival to the Rheinisches Museum für Philologie, the oldest and then the dominant classical journal in the German-speaking world. Hermes is listed by Scopus, where it has a CiteScore of 0.2.
