= Pompeii: Out of Time with Tom Hiddleston =

2026 American documentary-drama television series

- Genre: Documentary; Drama
- Directed by: Tom Barbor-Might
- Presented by: Tom Hiddleston
- Starring: Lubna Azabal; Bernard Satariano
- Country of origin: United States
- Original language: English
- No. of episodes: 3

Production
- Executive producers: Tom Hiddleston; Kevin R. Wright
- Producer: Ithaca

Original release
- Network: National Geographic
- Release: July 22 – July 22, 2026

Pompeii: Out of Time with Tom Hiddleston is a 2026 American three-part documentary-drama television series produced for National Geographic. Hosted and executive produced by actor Tom Hiddleston, the series combines documentary interviews with scripted dramatic reconstructions to investigate whether any residents of Pompeii and the neighbouring town of Herculaneum survived the eruption of Mount Vesuvius in 79 AD.

The series premiered July 22, 2026, with all three episodes airing back-to-back on National Geographic, then streaming the following day on Disney+ and Hulu.

== Premise ==
Rather than retelling Pompeii's destruction solely as a story of loss, the series sets out to identify residents who may have escaped the catastrophe. Working with the Pompeii Survivors Project led by classicist Steven Tuck, Hiddleston cross-references names inscribed on objects and buildings found in Pompeii with names that resurface elsewhere in the Roman world after the eruption, on the theory that anyone named in records after AD 79 likely lived through it.

The series follows the fates of three individuals across the eruption's roughly 24-hour timeline: Avianius, a teenage apprentice to a bronzesmith; Julia Felix, a businesswoman who owned a bathhouse and estate; and an unidentified Praetorian Guard whose belongings were recovered at Herculaneum.

Hiddleston has described his approach as combining the historical record with an actor's technique of imaginative reconstruction, moving between present-day investigation at the archaeological sites and dramatised re-enactments of the disaster. The series' visual style borrows devices associated with Hiddleston's Marvel character Loki, including gestures that appear to pause, rewind, or replay time as the host revises his account of events in light of new evidence.

== Episodes ==
No.	Title	Directed by	Written by	Original release date
1	"Tremors"	Tom Barbor-Might	Unknown	July 22, 2026
Tom Hiddleston challenges the idea that Pompeii was destroyed without warning, tracing early signs from Vesuvius and following Avianius and Julia Felix as earthquakes disrupt the city and the countdown to eruption begins.
2	"Eruption"	Tom Barbor-Might	Unknown	July 22, 2026
As Vesuvius erupts and daylight turns to darkness, Hiddleston investigates a possible naval rescue and the fate of a Praetorian Guard at Herculaneum as pyroclastic surges begin.
3	"Survival"	Tom Barbor-Might	Unknown	July 22, 2026
As the final, lethal surges strike, Hiddleston uncovers new evidence about the fates of Avianius and Julia Felix and reflects on what survival meant for Pompeii's residents.

== Production ==
The series was developed by Hiddleston's production company Ithaca, which he co-founded with producer Kevin R. Wright after their work together on the Disney+ series Loki. Wright, a former U.S. Marine who had produced combat documentaries before joining Marvel Studios, said the pair did not want to strictly separate the documentary and dramatised elements of the show, instead aiming to let each feed into the other.

Hiddleston's connection to Pompeii dates to 1998, when he visited the site at age 17 during an Interrail trip across Europe with two friends; he has said the visit inspired him to study Classics at the University of Cambridge and later pursue acting.

A 2021 scene in the first season of Loki, in which Hiddleston's character and Mobius (Owen Wilson) travel to Pompeii shortly before the eruption, is cited by both Hiddleston and Wright as an informal precursor to the documentary.

Hiddleston has also said he was encouraged to pursue a National Geographic project after seeing his Thor co-star Chris Hemsworth host the network's series Limitless and A Road Trip to Remember; Tom Barbor-Might, who directed installments of both Hemsworth shows, went on to direct and serve as showrunner on Pompeii: Out of Time.

Hiddleston initially resisted including the site's well-known plaster casts of victims in the series, saying he wanted to first establish the humanity of the people they represent before showing them on screen; the casts ultimately appear in the third episode, after the stories of the three featured Romans have been told.

== Reception ==
Critical response to the series was mixed, with several reviewers praising its ambition and Hiddleston's evident passion for the subject while finding his on-camera presentation overwrought.

Writing in The Guardian, Lucy Mangan described the show as embarrassing and exhausting but undeniably entertaining, criticising what she characterised as melodramatic narration and staging while acknowledging she was drawn in regardless. In The Independent, Adam White similarly described Hiddleston as an uncomfortable, theatrical host, arguing the show functions as much as a reflection on Hiddleston's own fame as a work of history, though he credited Hiddleston's evident sincerity. The Los Angeles Times's Robert Lloyd called the series stylistically uneven and "a little goofy" but said he enjoyed it greatly, praising the quality of its dramatic reconstructions and the performance of Lubna Azabal as Julia Felix. The Wall Street Journal's John Anderson credited Hiddleston's classics background for lending the series credibility and highlighted its focus on why more residents did not flee before the eruption as a particularly compelling thread. Variety's Addie Morfoot framed the series as a rare documentary format with the potential to draw younger audiences, citing showrunner Tom Barbor-Might's stated goal of blending documentary and dramatic technique to reach viewers who do not typically watch traditional historical documentaries.

== Cast and contributors ==
Contributors featured alongside Hiddleston include classicist Steven Tuck, archaeologist Caitie Barrett, geoscientist Chris Jackson, and disaster/survival psychologist Sarita Robinson.

Actors in the series' dramatised sequences include Lubna Azabal, who portrays Julia Felix, and Bernard Satariano, who portrays Julius.

== Release ==
Pompeii: Out of Time with Tom Hiddleston premiered on National Geographic on July 22, 2026, at 8 p.m. ET, with all three episodes airing consecutively, and became available to stream on Disney+ and Hulu on July 23, 2026.
