= Gnomon (journal) =

Review journal and bibliography in the classics

- Discipline: Classics, Archaeology
- Language: English

Publication details
- History: 1925–present

Standard abbreviations
- ISO 4: Gnomon

Indexing
- ISSN: 0017-1417

Links
- Journal homepage

Gnomon. Kritische Zeitschrift für die gesamte klassische Altertumswissenschaft (Gnomon: Critical Journal of the Entire Field of Scholarship on Classical Antiquity) is a German review journal covering the classics. It was established in 1925, first published by Verlag Weidmann and since 1949 by Verlag C. H. Beck. The journal appears in 8 issues each year and contains reviews, obituaries, and notices. Since 1950, odd-numbered volumes contain a "Bibliographic Supplement" of new books, dissertations and submitted journal articles, in addition to the regular contents. The editors-in-chief are Hans-Joachim Gehrke, Martin Hose, Henner von Hesberg, Ernst Vogt, and Paul Zanker.

== Abstracting and indexing ==
The journal is abstracted and indexed in the Arts & Humanities Citation Index and Current Contents/Arts & Humanities. In both 2007 and 2011 the journal received an "INT1" ranking (internationally recognised with high visibility) from the European Reference Index for the Humanities.

== Gnomon Bibliographische Datenbank ==
In 1994 the Gnomon Bibliographische Datenbank (Gnomon bibliographic database) was established, containing data on Gnomon articles, monographs, book chapters, journal articles from over 200 classics journals. Entries were in German or English. Since the beginning of 1996 there has been a sister project, Gnomon Online, which provides access to the database through the internet and is updated weekly.

== List of editors ==
The following persons have been editor-in-chief of the journal:

- 1925–1933: Ludwig Curtius
- 1925–1933: Ludwig Deubner
- 1925–1933: Eduard Fraenkel
- 1925–1962: Matthias Gelzer
- 1925–1933: Ernst Hoffmann
- 1925–1933: Werner Jaeger
- 1925–1933: Walther Kranz
- 1925–1933: Karl Meister
- 1925–1933: Peter von der Mühll
- 1925–1933: Karl Reinhardt
- 1925–1943: Gerhart Rodenwaldt
- 1925–1933: Wilhelm Schubart
- 1925–1933: Wilhelm Schulze
- 1925–1933: Eduard Schwartz
- 1925–1933: Johannes Stroux
- 1925–1933: Wilhelm Weber
- 1930–1943: Richard Harder
- 1940–1994: Erich Burck
- 1949–1965: Friedrich Matz
- 1954–1977: Walter Marg
- 1963–1978: Hermann Strasburger
- 1966–1977: Nikolaus Himmelmann
- 1975–2017: Ernst Vogt
- since 1978: Paul Zanker
- 1979–1995: Walter Schmitthenner
- 1988–2007: Carl Joachim Classen
- 1996–2025: Hans-Joachim Gehrke
- since 2000: Henner von Hesberg
- since 2000: Martin Hose
- since 2010: Christoph Horn
- since 2010: Katharina Volk
- since 2017: Martin Bentz
- since 2017: Ruth Bielfeldt
- since 2017: Peter Eich
- since 2026: Johannes Wienand
