= Anton Westermann =

German classical philologist

Anton Westermann (18 June 1806, Leipzig – 24 November 1869, Leipzig) was a German classical philologist.

From 1825 to 1830, he studied philology at the University of Leipzig, where in 1833 he became an associate professor of classical philology. From 1834 to 1865, he was a full professor of Greek and Roman literature at Leipzig. On four separate occasions he was dean to the faculty of philosophy.

He is known for his edition and critical examination of Demosthenes, for his edition of works by ancient authors such as Plutarch, Lysias, Callistratus and Philostratus, and for his scholarly treatment of Greek mythography ("Mythographoi"), biography ("Biographoi") and paradoxography ("Paradoxographoi"). His edition of Heraclitus' epistles, Heracliti Epistolae quae feruntur (1857), later appeared in Rudolf Hercher's Epistolographi Graeci.

== Published works ==
=== Editions of classical authors ===
- Plutarchi Vitae decem oratorum, Quedlinburg and Leipzig 1833.
- Paradoxographoi, scriptores rerum mirabilium graeci, Braunschweig 1839.
- Stephani Byzantii Ἐθνικῶν [Ethnicorum] quae supersunt, 1839; (edition of Ethnika by Stephanus of Byzantium)
- Diogenis Laertii De clarorum philosophorum : vitis, dogmatibus et apophthegmatibus libri decem, 1842; (part of series: Bibliotheca scriptorum graecorum editore A. Firmin-Didot, with other authors).
- Mythographoi. Scriptores poeticae historiae Graeci, Braunschweig 1843.
- Biographoi. Vitarum scriptores Graeci minores, Braunschweig 1845.
- Philostratorum et Callistrati opera, 1849 (with other authors)
- Lysiae Orationes, 1854
- Heracliti epistolae (Leipzig 1857)

=== School editions (Schulausgaben) ===
- Ausgewählte Reden des Demosthenes erklärt (Berlin: Weidmann)
  - 1. Bändchen: Reden I–VI und VIII–IX (1851 digitized; 1853^{2} digitized; 1856^{3} digitized; 1860^{4} digitized; 1866^{5} digitized; 1871^{6} digitized; 1875^{7} von Emil Müller digitized; 1883^{8}, 1891^{9} digitized und 1902^{10} digitized besorgt von Emil Rosenberg)
  - 2. Bändchen: Reden XVIII und XX (1850 digitized; 1855^{2} digitized; 1860^{3} digitized; 1868^{4} digitized; 1874^{5} digitized; 1885^{6} digitized und 1903^{7} besorgt von Emil Rosenberg)
  - 3. Bändchen: Reden XXIII, LIV und LVII (1852 digitized; 1865^{2} digitized; 1890^{3} besorgt von Emil Rosenberg digitized)

=== Translations ===
- Demosthenes' Ausgewählte Reden verdeutscht (4 volumes) digitized
  - 1. Bändchen: [Reden I–VI und VIII–IX]: Olynthische; Friede; Chersones; gegen Philippus (Stuttgart: Hoffmann, 1856)
  - 2. Bändchen: Aeschines' [Rede II] und Demosthenes' [Rede XVIII] Reden gegen und für Ktesiphon von Kranze (Stuttgart: Krais & Hoffmann, 1859)
  - 3. Bändchen: Rede gegen Leptines [XX] und Meidias [XXI] (Stuttgart: Krais & Hoffmann, 1863; Stuttgart und Leipzig: Wilhelm Nübling^{3})
  - 4. Bändchen: Reden gegen Androtion [XXII], gegen Aristokrates [XXIII], gegen Aphobos [XXVII–XXVIII], gegen Onetor [XXX–XXXI], gegen Konon [LIV], gegen Eubulides [LVII] (Stuttgart: Hoffmann, 1868)

=== Other ===
- Quaestiones Demosthenicae, 4 volumes, Leipzig 1830–37.
- Geschichte der Beredtsamkeit in Griechenland und Rom, 2 volumes, Leipzig 1833-1835 – History of eloquence in Greece and Rome.
- Die Modalität der Athenischen Gesetzgebung, geprüft an den in die Rede des Demosthenes gegen Timokrates §§ 20 - 23, 27, 33, 39, 40, 59 (Untersuchungen über die in die Attischen Redner eingelegten Urkunden, Tl. 1), Leipzig 1850 – The modality of Athenian legislation examined in the speech of Demosthenes against Timocrates. Investigations on proceedings in the Attic orators' documents.
- Untersuchung über die in die attischen Reden eingelegten Urkunden (Leipzig 1850, 2 parts)
- Index graecitatis Hyperideae (Leipzig 1860–64, 8 parts)
