= Otto Seeck =

German classical historian (1850–1921)

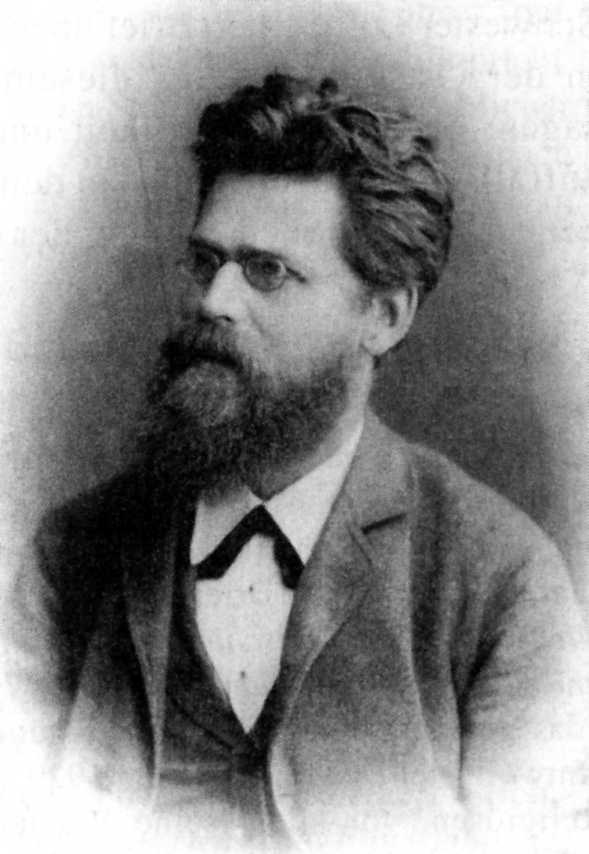
Otto Seeck

Otto Karl Seeck (2 February 1850 – 29 June 1921) was a German classical historian who is perhaps best known for his work on the decline of the ancient world. He was born in Riga.

== Life and career ==
He first began studying chemistry at the Imperial University of Dorpat but transferred to the University of Berlin to study classical history under Theodor Mommsen. Seeck earned his doctorate from the University of Berlin in 1872 after writing his thesis on the Notitia Dignitatum, a document enumerating the roles and responsibilities of administrative officials of the later Roman Empire c. 400 AD. He habilitated under Mommsen in Berlin in 1877 and, with the help of Mommsen, secured a post at the University of Greifswald in 1881, where he taught Roman History and Archaeology. There he met Karl Julius Beloch. In 1907 he went to the University of Münster where he continued teaching and writing.

Seeck wrote many influential works on late antiquity and social Darwinism. He was widely published in such academic journals as the Deutsche Zeitschrift für Geschichtswissenschaft (German Journal of History), Hermes, Zeitschrift für Kirchengeschichte (Journal of Church History), and the Zeitschrift für Sozial- und Wirtschaftsgeschichte (Journal of Social and Economic History). Some of his monographs, including his influential 6-volume Geschichte des Untergangs der antiken Welt (History of the Decline of the Ancient World)—which set forth his beliefs concerning social Darwinism, later influencing Oswald Spengler—are still in print today.

== Selected works ==
- Quaestiones de notitia dignitatum. Dissertation, Berlin 1872 (Questions concerning the Notitia Dignitatum)
- Notitia dignitatum. Accedunt notitia urbis Constantinopolitanae et laterculi provinciarum. Berlin 1876
- Die Kalendertafel der Pontifices. Berlin 1885 (The Calendar Tables of the Pontifices)
- Die Quellen der Odyssee. Berlin 1887 (The Sources of the Odyssey)
- Die Briefe des Libanius zeitlich geordnet. Leipzig 1906 (The letters of Libanius arranged chronologically)
- Regesten der Kaiser und Päpste für die Jahre 311 bis 476 n. Chr.: Vorarbeit zu einer Prosopographie der christlichen Kaiserzeit. Stuttgart 1919. (Synopses of the emperors and popes for the years 311-476 AD: preliminary work for a prosopography the Christian Empire)
- Geschichte des Untergangs der antiken Welt. 6 Bände. Metzler, Stuttgart 1895–1920 (History of the Decline of the Ancient World)
- Kaiser August. 1902 (Caesar Augustus)
