= Lobegott Samuel Obbarius =

Lobegott Samuel Obbarius (12 December 1788, Heringen – 29 December 1860, Rudolstadt) was a German educator and classical philologist known for his edition and examination of works by the Roman poet Horace. His son, Friedrich August Theodor Obbarius (1817–1855), was also a classical scholar.

From 1808 he studied theology and philology at the University of Jena, where he was a pupil of Johann Jakob Griesbach, Johann Christian Wilhelm Augusti, Georg Ludwig Walch and Johann Philipp Gabler. After working as a private tutor for five years in Kelbra, he moved to Frankenhausen, where he served as subkonrektor at the Lyceum. In 1817 he was appointed "collaborator" to the local church ministry. In 1819 he became a professor at the gymnasium at Rudolstadt, a position he maintained up until his death. In 1842 he was awarded with an honorary degree from the University of Marburg, and in 1844 he became a member of the Societas Latina Jenensis (Latin Society of Jena).

== Selected published works ==
- "Des Quintus Horatius Flaccus erster Brief des ersten Buches", 1822.
- "In Horatii epistolam libri I secundam", 1828.
- "Horatiana: Kritiken über Horaz betreffende Programme", 1829.
- "Quinti Horatii Flacci epistolae commentariis uberrimis instructae" (with Friedrich Ernst Theodor Schmid).
- "Rudolstadt, sein Fichtennadel-Dampfbad und seine Umgebungen", 1855.
- "Des Q. Horatius Flaccus Oden und Epoden", 1856 (with Friedrich August Theodor Obbarius).
