= Ernst Vogt =

German classical philologist

Ernst Vogt (6 November 1930 – 9 August 2017) was a German classical philologist. He was a professor at the University of Mannheim (1967–1975) and LMU Munich (1975–1999). Between 2002 and 2014 he served president of the International Thesaurus Commission.

Vogt engaged with the history of literary forms and genres, with Greek literature of the Hellenistic and Roman Empire periods, with the history of how classical literature was delivered and received, and with the history of classical philology.

== Biography ==
Ernst Walter Siegfried Vogt was born and grew up in Duisburg, a dynamic commercial and manufacturing center which at that time (as now) was home to one of the world's largest inland ports. His father was a lawyer. He successfully completed his schooling at the city's Landfermann-Gymnasium (secondary school) and then, in 1950, moved on to study classical philology, archeology and philosophy, upriver at the University of Bonn. His student career at Bonn lasted until 1956, during which time the scope of his studies also covered papyrology and language sciences. In 1951/52, he spent a year at the University of Tübingen. He also received a DAAD scholarship which enabled him to spend a year in Athens. It was nevertheless from the University of Bonn that, in 1956, he received his doctorate. His dissertation formed the basis for his "Procli hymni" published the next year. The doctorate was supervised by the polyhistorian Hans Herter, whose research assistant he now became. He passed his Level I national teaching exams at around the same time. Four years later he received his habilitation, a higher academic qualification which opened the way to a lifelong academic career. Two years after that, in 1962, he was appointed to an extraordinary professorship, still at Bonn. Between 1959 and 1967, he was also responsible on a day-to-day basis, as "Schriftleiter", for the contents of the Rheinisches Museum für Philologie (journal), under the direction of Hans Herter.

Meanwhile, on 2 August 1963, Ernst Vogt married Monika Vagedes in the Altenberg Abbey Church. At least three children resulted from the marriage, and by the time he died Ernst and Monika Vogt were also grandparents.

In 1967, Vogt accepted an invitation to move to the University of Mannheim where he took a full professorship, and where later, in 1970/71, he became dean of faculty for language and literature sciences. In 1970, he took charge as "Schriftleiter" at the academic (Classics) journal Gnomon which under his aegis became probably the most influential periodical in the sector. He remained at Gnomon till 1999. Between 1973 and 1975, he served as chairman of the research council and a member of the governing council at the University of Mannheim. Between 1974 and 1976, he held a senior administrative position in the philosophy faculty.

In 1975, he accepted an appointment at LMU Munich. In 1977, he was elected a full member of the Bavarian Academy of Sciences and Humanities where in 1978, he became a member of the commission for the production of the Thesaurus Linguae Latinae, which between 1986 and 2014 he chaired. In 1979, he became a corresponding member of the German Archaeological Institute. Between 1980 and 1988, he lectured for the German Academic Scholarship Foundation ("Studienstiftung"), and between 1981 and 1983 as dean of the faculty for language and literature sciences. In 1983, he became a member of the International Thesaurus Commission, becoming vice-president of it in 1988 and president between 2002 and 2014. He also served, between 1986 and 1990, as a member of LMU Munich's senate. In 1986, he became a member of the Bavarian Academy commission to produce a second series of the "Acta conciliorum oecumenicorum", chairing the commission from 1988. In 1991, he took a guest professorship at the University of Rome Tor Vergata. In 1994, the Union of German Academies of Sciences and Humanities appointed him a delegate to the Union Académique Internationale, a role he sustained until 2008. In 1994, he also joined the commission Bavarian Academy's commission for the production of the "Deutschen Inschriften des Mittelalters und der frühen Neuzeit" ("German Medieval and early modern inscriptions").

In 1997, Vogt received the Praemium Classicum Clavarense (prize) from the Italian Society of Classical Culture. From that year he was a member of the Scientific Committee at the specialist journal Eikasmós. In 1999, he retired. Nevertheless, from 2000, he was a council member at the Görres Society, and in 2002, he accepted a guest professorship at the University of Naples Federico II.
