= Sarita Robinson =

British survival scientist and broadcaster

Sarita Robinson, sometimes called Dr Survival, is a British academic researcher in the area of survival psychology, specializing in survival strategies and the human consequences of major disasters. She has served as a committee member of the British Psychological Society's Crisis, Disaster and Trauma Section and on the committee of the Institute of Civil Protection and Emergency Management. In these roles she has contributed to policy and practice on emergency responses and trauma treatment. A frequent interviewee and contributor to TV and radio news and current affairs programming, her live presentations include How to Survive an Alien Invasion and The Psychology of Surviving the Apocalypse. She is one of the key experts featured in the National Geographic three-part docuseries Pompeii: Out of Time with Tom Hiddleston.

A science fiction reader and a lifelong fan of Doctor Who, Robinson attends and often gives popular science talks at genre-themed conventions. She appears at Bushcraft shows, giving talks and running workshops, and is a practiced kayaker. In pursuit of her specialty she has joined firefighters and military personnel in training, including outdoor survival exercises and Helicopter Underwater Escape Training. She has also performed standup comedy at the Edinburgh Fringe.

== Early life ==
Robinson was born and received her early education in the northwest of England. Both of her parents were mental health nurses and she has one sibling. She is married with two sons.

== Academic career ==
After earning an undergraduate degree in Psychology from Lancaster University she took a master's degree in Cognitive Sciences at Manchester University. Returning to Lancaster to undertake a PhD under the supervision of survival expert John Leach, she then joined the School of Psychology at the University of Lancashire in 2005, rising to the role of associate dean.

== Media ==
- Surviving Pompeii with Tom Hiddleston (3 episodes, onscreen expert) (National Geographic 2026)
- Woman's Hour (Jane Garvey interview, BBC Radio 4 2025)
- This Morning (live interview, ITV 2024)
- Andrew Marr (live interview, LBC 2022)
- The Psychology of Prepping (live interview, BBC Radio Scotland 2020)
- Sky World News (live interview, BSkyB 2020)
- Time Change (onscreen contributor, CNN 2020)
- Comedians Giving Lectures (panel of judges, UKTV 2019)
- History (onscreen contributor, ZDF 2019)
- Jobs From Hell: Caught On Camera (advising psychologist) (Channel 4 2019)
- Flights From Hell: Caught On Camera (contributing psychologist) (Channel 4) 2018
- The Great Fire (onscreen contributor, Lion Television 2017)
- The Cheating Memory (onscreen contributor, 2 Entertain/BBC Worldwide 2011)

== Published work ==
- Unmasked: The Science of Superheroes STEM textbook for young adults, ed James Phoenix
- Westworld Psychology: Violent Delights ed Travis Langley, Wind Goodfriend
- Doctor Who Psychology: A Madman with a Box ed Travis Langley
- Thai cave boys: the psychology of surviving underground article, International Business Times
- What are the effects of isolation? An expert explains article, The Conversation
- The Psychology of 'Doctor Who' article, The Huffington Post
