= Callistratus (sophist) =

Greek sophist and rhetorician (fl. 300 CE)

Callistratus (Koine Greek: Καλλίστρατος), Greek sophist and rhetorician, probably flourished in the 3rd (or possibly 4th) century CE. He wrote Ekphraseis (also known by the Latin title Statuarum descriptiones, and Greek title Ἐκφράσεις), descriptions of fourteen works of art in stone or brass by distinguished artists. This little work is usually edited with the Eikones of Philostratus (whose form it imitates).

== Bibliography ==
- Editions of the Greek text
  - Edition by C. Schenkl and E. Reisch (Teubner series, 1902)
  - C. G. Heyne, Opuscula Academica, v. pp. 196–221, with commentary on the Descriptiones
  - A. Fairbanks, Loeb Classical Library edition (with Philostratus), with English translation (1931)
  - Balbina Bäbler and Heinz-Günther Nesselrath, Ars et verba: die Kunstbeschreibungen des Kallistratos, Greek text with introduction, annotations, and archeological commentary in German. Munich and Leipzig: K.G. Saur, 2006.
- F. Jacobs, Animadversiones criticae in Callistrati statuas (1797)
- Michel Costantini, Françoise Graziani, Stéphane Rolet, Le défi de l'art. Philostrate, Callistrate et l'image sophistique. Rennes: Presses Universitaires de Rennes, 2006.
