= Balbina Bäbler =

Swiss classical archaeologist

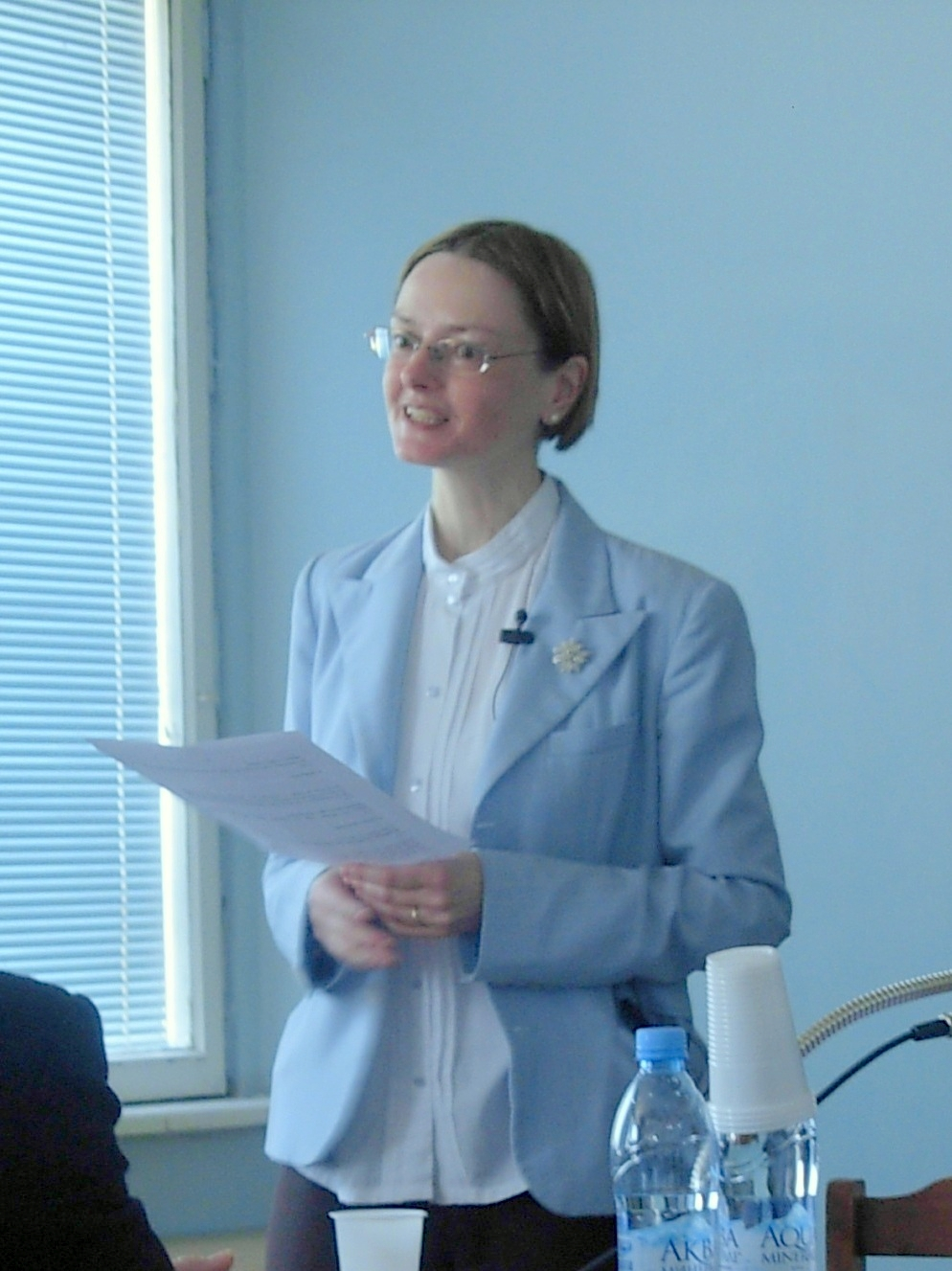
- Balbina Bäbler at Moscow State University
- Born: 1967, May 7 Glarus, Switzerland
- Occupations: Artist, archaeologist and university professor
- Spouse: Heinz-Günther Nesselrath

Balbina Bäbler (German: Balbina Bäbler, also known as Balbina Bäbler-Nesselrath; Glarus, 7 May 1967) is a Swiss archaeologist and historian, and is a specialist on the Northern Black Sea coastal area.

== Biography ==
Balbina Bäbler studied at the University of Bern and LMU Munich. She graduated the course in 1997 with a thesis on "Diligent Thracians and strong Scythians: non-Greek population of Athens of the classical period and their archaeological heritage" (Fleissige Thrakerinnen und wehrhafte Skythen Nichtgriechen im klassischen Athen und ihre archaologische Hinterlassenschaft.).

Bäbler is an expert on the archaeological chronology and burial cultures, and was an Honorary Fellow at the University of Exeter from 2002 until 2004. Bäbler worked at the University of Hamburg, Leibniz University Hannover, as well as at the University of Göttingen. She was a research fellow at the Winckelmann-Ausgabe of the Akademie der Wissenschaften und der Literatur in Mainz from 2010 to 2015. She has co-edited several books on archeology in the Black Sea.

Balbina Bäbler is an author of several articles in the encyclopedia Neue Pauly.

Bäbler was a part of a research team that investigated burials at a Byzantine basilica in Ashdod in Israel. The basilica is one of the earliest and largest Christian basilicas in Israel. The team announced in 2021 that they found at the site numerous burials of women recorded as deaconesses, including one recorded as "Holy Mother Sophronia". The role of deaconess has been disestablished in many Christian denominations, although some such as the Orthodox Church of Greece have re-established it. Pope Francis initiated a commission to investigate restoring deaconesses to the Catholic Church.

== Publications ==
- Fleissige Thrakerinnen und wehrhafte Skythen. Nichtgriechen im klassischen Athen und ihre archäologische Hinterlassenschaft, Teubner, Stuttgart-Leipzig 1998 ISBN 3-519-07657-8
- Die Welt des Sokrates von Konstantinopel. Studien zu Politik, Religion und Kultur im späten 4. und frühen 5. Jh. n. Chr. (Hrsg. mit Heinz-Günther Nesselrath), Saur, München-Leipzig 2001 ISBN 3-598-73003-9
- Archäologie und Chronologie. Eine Einführung, Wissenschaftliche Buchgesellschaft, Darmstadt 2004 (Einführung Archäologie) ISBN 3-534-15898-9
- Ars et Verba. Die Kunstbeschreibungen des Kallistratos. Einführung, Text, Übersetzung, Anmerkungen, archäologischer Kommentar (mit Heinz-Günther Nesselrath), Saur, München-Leipzig 2006 ISBN 3-598-73056-X
