= Rheinisches Museum für Philologie =

- Discipline: Classical history
- Language: English, German, French, Italian

Publication details
- History: 1827–present
- Publisher: J. D. Sauerländers Verlag
- Frequency: Annual

Standard abbreviations
- ISO 4: Rhein. Mus. Philol.

Indexing
- ISSN: 0035-449X

Links
- Journal homepage

Rheinisches Museum für Philologie (RhM) is a German journal of classical studies and philology. It was founded in 1827 by Barthold Georg Niebuhr, August Böckh and Christian August Brandis. Breaks in publication appeared shortly thereafter until a new series was introduced in 1842 that continues to the present. It is the oldest extant journal devoted to classical studies.

The Oxford Classical Dictionary abbreviation for the journal is Rh. Mus.
