= Against Timocrates =

Speech given by Demosthenes in Athens

"Against Timocrates" was a speech given by Demosthenes in Athens in which he accused Timocrates of proposing an illegal decree. The speech provides our best evidence about the use of imprisonment as a punishment in Classical Athens.

Timocrates' law would have allowed debtors to the state to go free on providing a surety, rather than being imprisoned until they paid their debts. Demosthenes' speech criticises this law on the grounds that it would unfairly advantage wealthy citizens at the expense of the poor.

== Historical background ==
The speech can be dated to the summer of 353 BC. A series of events led to the trial. Three Athenians in 355 BC, including Androtion, whilst sailing as ambassadors to Mausolus, the King of Caria, captured a merchant ship near Naucratis, claiming lawful seizure of enemy property. The ambassadors held onto the plunder they received until a commission was appointed into the matter, moved by Euctemon and Diodorus. Euctemon and Diodorus gave information against the two trierarchs who had been commanding the ambassadors' ship. The result was that the ambassadors admitted possession of the money, however Euctemon furthered his investigation and proposed a decree (which was passed) that the trierarchs should be responsible for recovering the money.

Androtion and his supporters in retaliation proposed a graphe paranomon (the charge for proposing an unlawful decree) against Euctemon. Euctemon was acquitted; however, Timocrates, a friend of the ambassadors, then proposed his law that any debtor of the state should remain at liberty until the ninth prytany on the condition that they provided a surety. This presumably would have enabled the ambassadors to escape with their plunder. The speech "Against Timocrates" details the graphe paranomon Euctemon and Diodorus brought against Timocrates in retaliation. Diodorus opens the speech. The action of the graphe paranomon suspended the effect of Timocrates' law, and the ambassadors were forced to pay the money. The action against Timocrates however was not halted but pursued.
