= Barbara Borg =

German classical archaeologist

Barbara Borg FSA
- Born: 26 December 1960 (age 65); Germany

Academic background
- Education: Heidelberg University, Göttingen University, Ruhr-University Bochum
- Thesis: Mumienporträts – Chronologie und kultureller Kontext

Academic work
- Discipline: Classical archaeology
- Sub-discipline: Geoarchaeology
- Institutions: University of Exeter
- Notable works: Crisis and ambition: Roman tombs and burial customs in the third century CE; Roman tombs and the art of commemoration: contextual approaches to funerary customs in the second century CE

Barbara Elisabeth Borg FSA (born 26 December 1960) is Professor of Classical Archaeology at the Scuola Normale Superiore. She is known in particular for her work on Roman tombs, the language of classical art, and geoarchaeology.

== Career ==
Borg studied Classical Archaeology, Philosophy and Geology at Ruhr-University Bochum from 1981 to 1985 and gained her PhD at Georg-August-University, Göttingen, in 1990 with the thesis Mumienporträts – Chronologie und kultureller Kontext. Borg gained her Habilitation and venia legendi for Classical Archaeology at Ruprecht-Karls-University, Heidelberg in 1999 with the thesis Der Logos des Mythos – Allegorien und Personifikationen in der frühen griechischen Kunst.

From 1993 to 2004 Borg held various teaching and research positions in Germany including acting Head of Department and Director of the Collection of Antiquities at the Archaeological Institute of Ruprecht-Karls-University. In 2004 she moved to the University of Exeter as professor of Classical Archaeology. She was Head of Classics from 2010 to 2015 and from 2018 onwards.

== Honours ==
Borg has held a number of visiting fellowships, including the Hugh Last Fellowship at the British School at Rome (2013), the Senior Onassis Fellowship at the Waterloo Institute for Hellenic Studies (2012), and a Getty Scholarship at the Getty Research Institute (2011).

Borg has been a corresponding member of the German Archaeological Institute since 2006, was elected to the Academy of Europe in 2012, and was elected as Fellow of the Society of Antiquaries of London in 2015.

Borg received a Major Research Fellowship from the Leverhulme Trust in 2014.

== Academic work ==
Borg's early work emphasised the cross-cultural links of Roman art, including the edited volume Paideia: The World of the Second Sophistic, which places Roman sculpture in the wider context of intellectual and literary culture. Her interest in the history and reception of Roman sculptures is evident in her contribution to the first full publication of the remarkable collection of antiquities at Castle Howard with Professor Henner von Hesberg and the late Andreas Linfert, one of the oldest collections of antiquities in Great Britain and of statues from antiquity.

Borg's recent work on Roman tombs and burial customs of the 2nd and 3rd centuries, resulting in two monographs in 2013 and 2018, has been widely recognised due to Borg's meticulous and thorough treatment of the material evidence. Her conclusion that 'the open-air display of sarcophagi was much more common than is attested by preserved or documented examples or that multiple burials were frequent in sarcophagi' (Katharine Meinecke) has been supported by further work on imperial funerary monuments in the Suburbium of Rome. Borg's Blackwell Companion to Roman Art provides a substantial evaluation of methodological approaches to the different media and zones of Roman art, with a range of experts in the different sub-fields highlighting critical issues and approaches.

Borg has commented that her work on funerary culture aims to bring together all available evidence and to demonstrate that customs were shared between Christians and non-Christians in the Roman world.

Borg's most recent work is a micro-history of the first part of the Via Appia.

== Selected publications ==
- Roman tombs and the art of commemoration: contextual approaches to funerary customs in the second century CE (Cambridge University Press, 2018)
- A Companion to Roman Art (Wiley-Blackwell, 2015)
- Crisis and ambition: tombs and burial customs in third-century CE Rome (Oxford University Press, 2013)
- with H von Hesberg and A Linfert Die antiken Skulpturen in Castle Howard (Wiesbaden, Reichert, 2005)
- Paideia: the world of the Second Sophistic (Berlin, de Gruyter, 2004)
- Der Logos des Mythos. Allegorien und Personifikationen in der frühen griechischen Kunst (Wilheim Fink Verlag, 2002)
- "Der zierlichste Anblick der Welt" : ägyptische Porträtmumien (Mainz, von Zabern, 1998)
- Mumienporträts : Chronologie und kultureller Kontext (Mainz, von Zabern, 1996)
