= Georg Ludwig Walch =

- Born: May 8, 1785; Jena, Holy Roman Empire
- Died: January 21, 1838 (aged 52); Greifswald, Kingdom of Prussia

Academic background
- Education: University of Jena

Academic work
- Discipline: Classical philology
- Institutions: University of Greifswald

Georg Ludwig Walch (8 May 1785, in Jena – 21 January 1838, in Greifswald) was a German classical philologist largely known for his edition and analysis of works by the Roman historian Tacitus. He was the grandson of theologian Johann Georg Walch (1693–1775).

Beginning in 1805, he studied at the University of Jena, where he subsequently worked as a librarian. In 1808 he obtained his habilitation at Jena. Since 1811 he served as an instructor of Latin and Greek languages at the Grauen Kloster in Berlin. In 1830 he succeeded Christian Wilhelm Ahlwardt as a professor of ancient languages at the University of Greifswald.

== Principal works ==
- Horaz als Mensch und Bürger von Rom, 1802 (by Richeus van Ommeren, translated from Dutch by Walch) – Horace as a human being and as a citizen of Rome.
- Meletematum criticorum specimen, 1809.
- Memoria Georgii Ludovici Spaldingii, 1815 – In memoriam of Georg Ludwig Spalding.
- Emendationes Livianae, 1815 – an edition of Livy.
- Tacitus’ Agrikola. Urschrift, Übersetzung, Anmerkungen und eine Abhandlung über die Kunstform der antiken Biographie, 1828 – Tacitus' "Agricola". Original, translation, notes, and a treatise on the art form of ancient biography.
- Tacitus’ Germania. Urschrift, Übersetzung, Anmerkungen und eine Abhandlung über antike Darstellung in Beziehung auf Zweck und Zusammenhang in Tacitus’ Germania, 1829 – Tacitus' "Germania". Original, translation, notes, and a treatise on ancient representation, etc.
- "Germania, Agricola and First Book of the Annals : with notes from Ruperti, Passow, Walch, and Bötticher's remarks on the style of Tacitus". (Latin text; notes in English). London : Taylor and Walton, 1840.
