= Henner von Hesberg =

German classical archaeologist

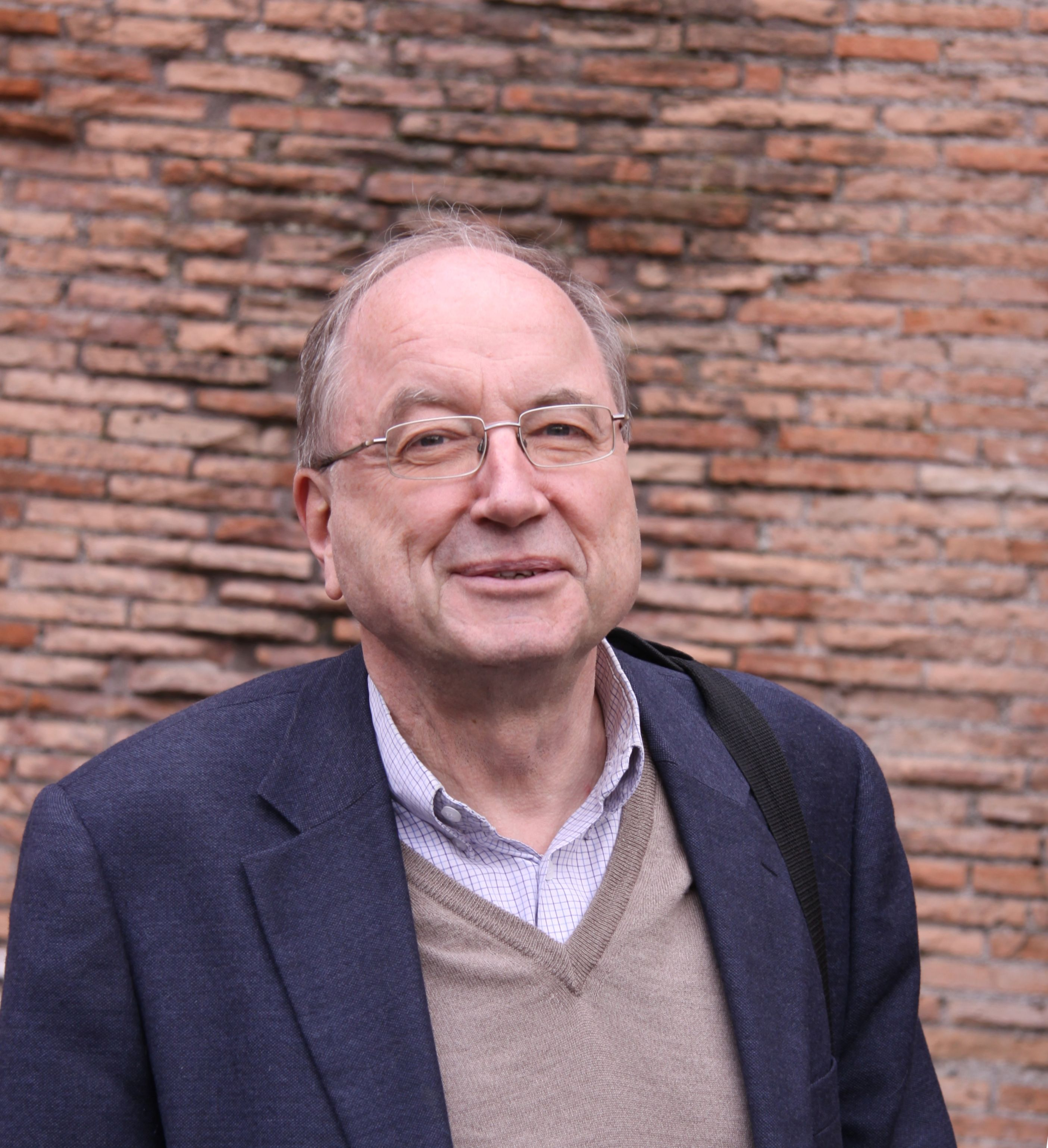
- Herner von Hesburg in March 2011
- Born: December 24, 1947
- Occupation: Classical Archaeologist

Academic background
- Education: Marburg University
- Alma mater: German Archaeological Institute

Henner von Hesberg (born 24 December 1947 in Lüneburg) is a German classical archaeologist.

Henner von Hesberg studied classical archaeology, ancient history, classical philology and art history from 1968 to 1975 at Bonn, Marburg and Wurzburg. He received his doctorate at Marburg University from Heinrich Drerup for his dissertation Zur Entwicklung und Funktion des Konsolengeison im Hellenismus und in der frühen Kaiserzeit (On the development and function of the Konsolengeison in the Hellenistic and early Imperial period). After that he received a scholarship from the German Archaeological Institute and was employed by them in Berlin and Rome.

From 1979 to 1983, von Hesberg was an Assistant lecturer at LMU Munich and he received his habilitation there in 1983 for Formen privater Repräsentation in der Baukunst des 2. und 1. Jahrhunderts v. Chr (Forms of private display in the architecture of the 2nd and 1st centuries BC). In 1984, he became a C2-Professor at LMU Munich and in 1987, he received a Chair at the University of Cologne, where he was spokesman for the graduate programme "Formierung und Selbstdarstellung städtischer Eliten im Römischen Reich" (Formation and Self-Representation of Civic Elites in the Roman Empire) and Dean of the Faculty of Philosophy from 1995 to 1997. From November 2006 until spring 2014, von Hesberg was the first director of the Rome school of the German Archaeological Institute. For this time, he was on a leave of absence from the University of Cologne. At the end of February 2014, he formally retired from his position at Cologne. His successor since 2006 has been Michael Heinzelmann. Von Hesberg is an ordinary member of the Mainz Akademie der Wissenschaften und der Literatur. Between 2008 and 2009, he delivered the Jerome Lecture Series at the University of Michigan.

Henner von Hesberg focused especially on Hellenistic and Roman architecture, urbanism, architectural decoration, Roman tomb structures, Hellenistic court art and art in the Roman provinces. A geographic focus of his work was ancient Italy, especially the city of Rome and its neighbourhood.

== Selected publications ==
- Konsolengeisa des Hellenismus und der frühen Kaiserzeit [Corbel Geisons of the Hellenistic and Early Imperial Period] (= Mitteilungen des Deutschen Archäologischen Instituts. Römische Abteilung. Ergänzungs-Heft 24). Zabern, Mainz 1981, ISBN 3-8053-0469-2.
- Römische Grabbauten [Roman Funerary Structures]. Wissenschaftliche Buchgesellschaft, Darmstadt 1992, ISBN 3-534-02446-X.
- Formen privater Repräsentation in der Baukunst des 2. und 1. Jahrhunderts v. Chr. [Forms of Private Representation in Architectural Art of the 2nd and 1st Centuries BC] Böhlau, Köln 1994, ISBN 3-412-07592-2.
- with Silvio Panciera: Das Mausoleum des Augustus. Der Bau und seine Inschriften [The Mausoleum of Augustus: The Building and its Inscriptions] (= Bayerische Akademie der Wissenschaften, Abhandlungen der Philosophisch-Historischen Klasse, N.F. 108). Beck, München 1994, ISBN 3-7696-0103-3.
- with Harald Mielsch: Die heidnische Nekropole unter St. Peter in Rom [The Pagan Necropolis under St Peter's in Rome]. (= Atti della Pontificia Accademia Romana di Archeologia, Ser. 03, Memorie. 16). L’Erma di Bretschneider, Roma 1995 ISBN 88-7062-903-1.
- with Dietrich Boschung, Andreas Linfert: Die antiken Skulpturen in Chatsworth sowie in Dunham Massey und Withington Hall [The Ancient Sculptures in Chatsworth, Dunham Massey and Withington Hall] (= Corpus Signorum Imperii Romani. Vol. 3, Fasc. 8. Monumenta artis Romanae. 26. Antike Skulpturen in englischen Schlössern). Zabern, Mainz 1997, ISBN 3-8053-1991-6.
- Römische Baukunst [Roman Architectural Art]. Beck, München 2005, ISBN 3-406-52920-8.
- with Barbara Borg, Andreas Linfert: Die antiken Skulpturen in Castle Howard [The Ancient Sculptures in Castle Howard] (= Monumenta artis Romanae. 31. Antike Skulpturen in englischen Schlössern). Reichert, Wiesbaden 2005, ISBN 3-89500-440-5.
- with Stephanie Dimas, Carola Reinsberg: Die Antikensammlungen von Hever Castle, Cliveden, Bignor Park und Knole [The Antiquity Collections of Hever Castle, Cliveden, Bignor Park and Knole. (= Monumenta artis Romanae. 38). Reichert, Wiesbaden 2014, ISBN 978-3-89500-714-9.
