= Martin Hose =

German classical philologist (born 1961)

Martin Hose (born 8 April 1961 in Wathlingen) is a German classical philologist.

After achieving the Abitur in 1981, Hose studied classical philology, history, and education at the Universities of Hamburg and Konstanz and graduated in 1988 from Konstanz with the Staatsexamen and the master of arts. After that, he taught at University College London from 1988 to 1989 and at the University of Konstanz from 1988 to 1994, where received his doctorate in 1990 for a work on the Chorus in Euripides and his habilitation in 1993 for a work on the historians of the Roman Empire from Florus to Cassius Dio. In 1994 he received a position at the University of Greifswald and he also taught at the University of Heidelberg part-time until 1995. Since 1997, Hose has held the Chair of Greek at LMU Munich.

Hose's research focuses are Greek drama, historiography, Hellenistic poetry and Greek literature of the Imperial period.

Alongside his scholarly activities, Hose is also active in university politics. From 1999 until 2001, he was Dean of the Faculty of Language and Literature at LMU Munich. Since 2002 he has been a member of the University Senate of LMU Munich, and he became its chairman in 2007. In this role, Hose is also ex officio deputy chairman of the university council.

From 1995 until 2001, he was a board member of the Mommsen Society. Since 2001, Hose has been an ordinary member of the Bavarian Academy of Sciences and Humanities. Since 2004 he has been a board member of the Fédération internationale des associations d’études classiques. In addition, he has been a co-editor of the review journal, Gnomon since 2000.

== Selected publications ==
- Studien zum Chor bei Euripides, Teil 1, Stuttgart 1990 (347 pp.) (Beiträge zur Altertumskunde Vol. 10) (= Diss. Konstanz 1990)
- Studien zum Chor bei Euripides, Teil 2, Stuttgart 1991 (467 pp.) (Beiträge zur Altertumskunde Vol. 20)
- Erneuerung der Vergangenheit. Die Historiker im Imperium Romanum von Florus bis Cassius Dio, Stuttgart/Leipzig 1994 (XII + 522 pp.) (Beiträge zur Altertumskunde Vol. 45) (= Habilitationsschrift Konstanz 1993)
- Drama und Gesellschaft. Studien zur dramatischen Produktion in Athen am Ende des 5. Jahrhunderts, Stuttgart 1995 (214 pp.) (Drama Beiheft 3)
- Kleine griechische Literaturgeschichte. Von Homer bis zum Ende der Antike, Munich 1999 (261 pp.) (Beck’sche Reihe)
- Aristoteles. Fragmente III. Die historischen Fragmente, übers. u. kommentiert von M. H. (Aristoteles Werke in deutscher Übersetzung, edited by Hellmut Flashar, Bd. 20.III), Akademie Verlag Berlin 2002 (307 pp.)
- Poesie aus der Schule. Überlegungen zur spätgriechischen Dichtung, Bayerische Akademie der Wissenschaften, Phil.-Hist. Kl., Sitzungsberichte. Jg. 2004, vol. 1, Munich 2004 (37 pp.)
- Euripides. Der Dichter der Leidenschaften, Munich 2008 (256 pp.) (Romanian translation 2010, Modern Greek translation 2011)
- Euripides als Anthropologe. (= Sitzungsberichte der Bayerische Akademie der Wissenschaften, Philosophisch-Historische Klasse. Jahrgang 2009, vol. 2), Munich 2009.
