= Steven L. Tuck =

American Classical scholar

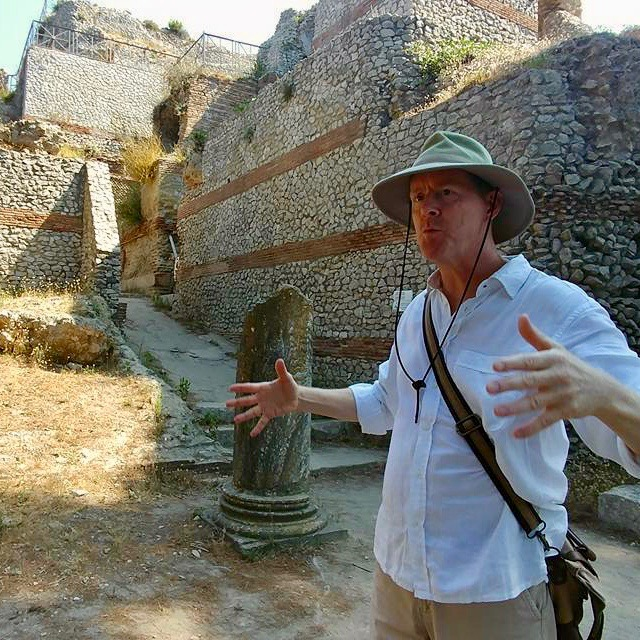
- Professor Tuck at an archeological site near Rome, Italy
- Education: Ph.D., University of Michigan
- Occupation: Classics scholar
- Employer: Miami University

Steven L. Tuck is a professor of classics, who is currently head of classics at Miami University. He teaches many classics courses at Miami University, especially those relating to the arts. He received a Ph.D. in Classical Art and Archaeology from University of Michigan in 1997, and he is the author of the textbook A History of Roman Art and Escape From Pompeii: The Great Eruption of Mount Vesuvius and Its Survivors.

In addition to his teaching, he has lectured the general public at Classics at the University of Colorado Boulder, Yale University, the University of Puget Sound, Baylor University and for the Getty Villa. He has also appeared in the media discussing classics, including in a 2019 feature for Atlas Obscura on the eruption of Mount Vesuvius in 79 C.E. and its impact on refugees and migration in the ancient world. For the Vergilian Society, he managed the Villa Vergiliana in Cumae, and organized educational programs there.

== Awards and recognitions ==
Tuck has received the Excellence in Undergraduate Teaching Award from the Archaeological Institute of America for 2014.

== Archaeological tours ==
Dr. Tuck leads educational journeys for Far Horizons Archaeological and Cultural trips

- Steve Tuck's tour page Steve Tuck
