= Heinz-Günther Nesselrath =

German classical philologist (born 1957)

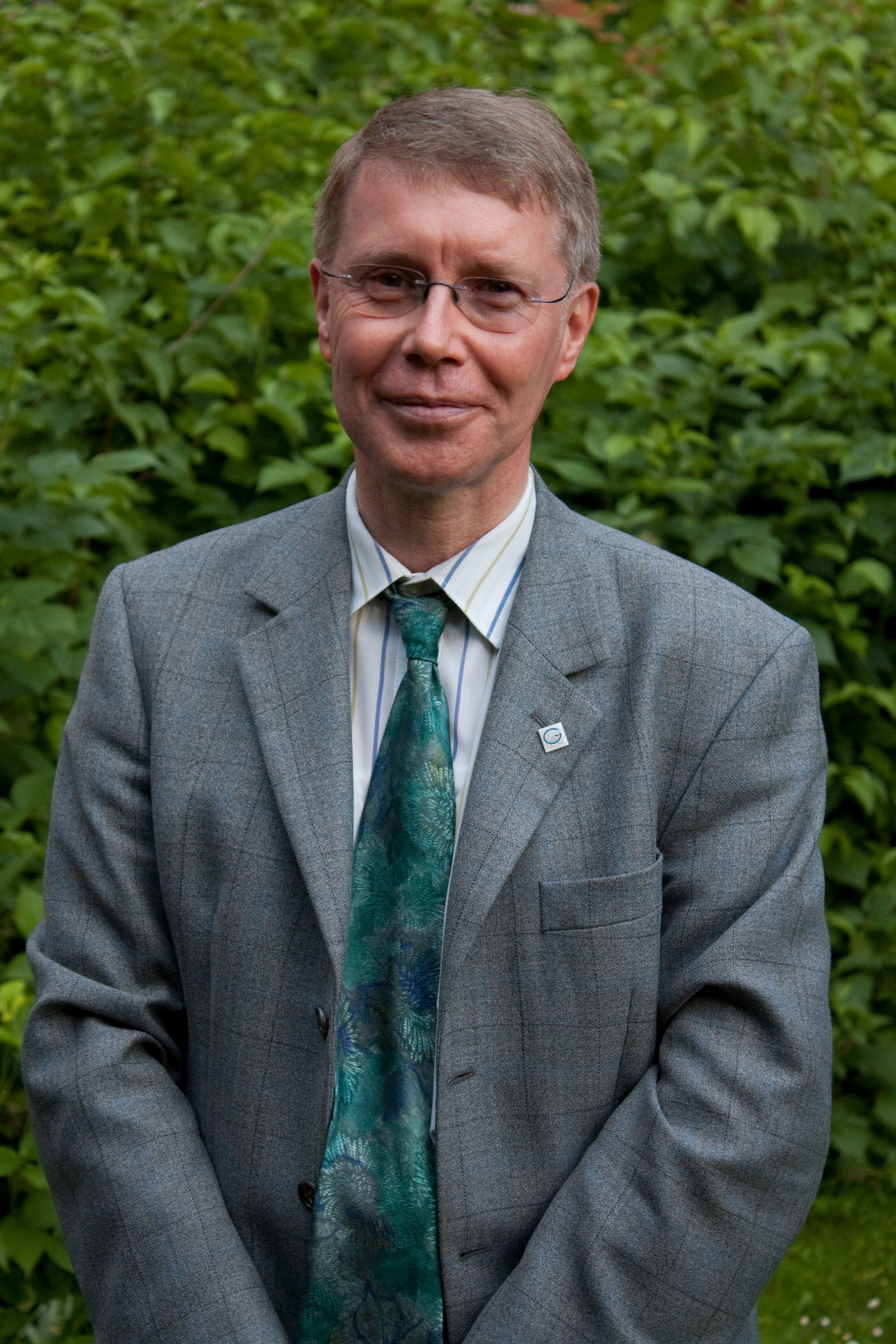
Heinz-Günther Nesselrath

Heinz-Günther Nesselrath (born 9 November 1957) is a German philologist.

== Career ==
Born in Rödingen, Heinz Günther Nesselrath studied classical philology in the University of Cologne from 1976 to 1981. Between 1981 and 1989 he held an assistant professorship at the Cologne Classics Institute, between 1989 and 1992 a Heisenberg Scholarship granted by the Deutsche Forschungsgemeinschaft ("German Research Foundation"). He reached Habilitation in 1987.

From 1992 to 2001 Nesselrath was a professor of classical philology at the University of Bern. In 2001, he became a professor and researcher at University of Göttingen. One of his research interests is Plato's presentation of Atlantis in the dialogues Critias and Timaeus.

Nesselrath regards Atlantis as an invention by Plato that must be understood as a parable or cautionary tale.
