= Ferdinando Castagnoli =

Italian topographer

Ferdinando Castagnoli (June 18, 1917, in Prato – July 28, 1988, in Marina di Pietrasanta) was a Roman topographer who taught at the University of Rome.

Among Castagnoli's fieldwork accomplishments was the amazing discovery of the Latin sanctuary at Lavinium (modern Pratica di Mare) and its series of 13 altars, a find that was revealed to the world in 1959. Also at the site is the so-called heroon of Aeneas.

Castagnoli was a student of Giuseppe Lugli. Among his students was Adriano La Regina, a former archaeological superintendent of Rome.

He was a member of Accademia Nazionale dei Lincei.

== Publications ==
- 1956. "La centuriazione di Cosa." Memoirs of the American Academy in Rome 24:147+149-165.
- 1956. Ippodamo di Mileto e l'urbanistica a pianta ortogonale. Rome: De Luca. (English translation, 1971. Orthogonal Town Planning in Antiquity. MIT Press.) Review by John E. Coleman, The Classical World 66.6 (1973):369-70.
- 1958. Topografia e urbanistica di Roma. Bologna : L. Cappelli.
- 1972. Lavinium. I, Topografia generale, fonti e storia delle ricerche. Rome: De Luca.
- 1975. Lavinium 2 : le tredici are. Rome: De Luca.
- 1980. Topographia di Roma antica (Enciclopedia classica, sez. 3. 10, Turin 1957; 2d rev. ed., Turin.
- 1982. "La leggenda di Enea nel Lazio." Studi Romani 30:1-15.
- 1984. "Il Tempio Romano: Questioni di Terminologia e di Tipologia." Papers of the British School at Rome 52:3-20.

== Necrology ==
- Obituary recorded in Vergilius 34
- Lucos Cozza. 1989. "Ferdinando Castagnoli 1917-1988." PBSR 57:xi-xiv.
- Jacques Heurgon. 1989. "FERDINANDO CASTAGNOLI 1917-1988." Revue Archéologique, Nouvelle Série, Fasc. 2:357-8.
