= Cyclopean masonry =

Type of stonework

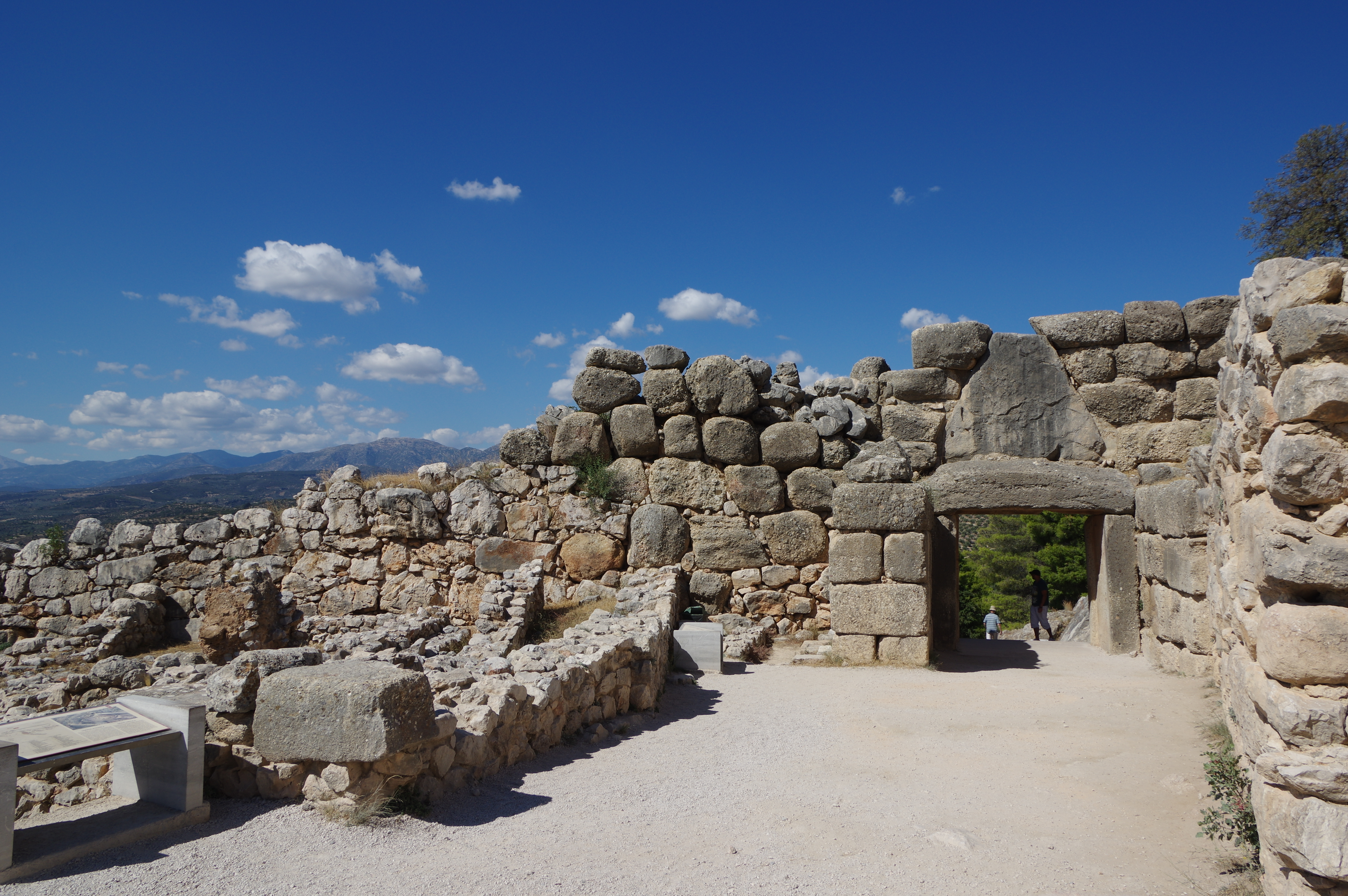
Cyclopean masonry, backside of the Lion Gate, Mycenae, Greece

Cyclopean masonry is a type of stonework found in Mycenaean architecture, built with massive limestone boulders, roughly fitted together with minimal clearance between adjacent stones and with clay mortar or no use of mortar. The boulders typically seem unworked, but some may have been worked roughly with a hammer and the gaps between boulders filled in with smaller chunks of limestone.

The most famous examples of Cyclopean masonry are found in the walls of Mycenae and Tiryns, and the style is characteristic of Mycenaean fortifications. Similar styles of stonework are found in other cultures and the term has come to be used to describe typical stonework of this sort.

The term comes from the assumption of classical Greeks that only the mythical Cyclopes had the strength to move the enormous boulders that made up the walls of Mycenae and Tiryns. Pliny's Natural History reported the tradition, attributed to Aristotle, that the Cyclopes were the inventors of masonry towers, giving rise to the designation "Cyclopean".

== Current definitions ==
The walls are usually founded in extremely shallow beddings carved out of the bedrock. "Cyclopean", the term normally applied to the masonry style characteristic of Mycenaean fortification systems, describes walls built of huge, unworked limestone boulders which are roughly fitted together. Between these boulders, smaller chunks of limestone fill the interstices. The exterior faces of the large boulders may be roughly hammer-dressed, but the boulders themselves are never carefully cut blocks. Very large boulders are typical of the Mycenaean walls at Mycenae, Tiryns, Argos, Krisa (in Phocis), and the Acropolis of Athens. Somewhat smaller boulders occur in the walls of Midea, whereas large limestone slabs are characteristic of the walls at Gla. Cut stone masonry is used only in and around gateways, conglomerate at Mycenae and Tiryns and perhaps both conglomerate and limestone at Argos.

== Outdated definitions of the Cyclopean style ==
Harry Thurston Peck, writing in 1898, divided Cyclopean masonry into four categories or styles:

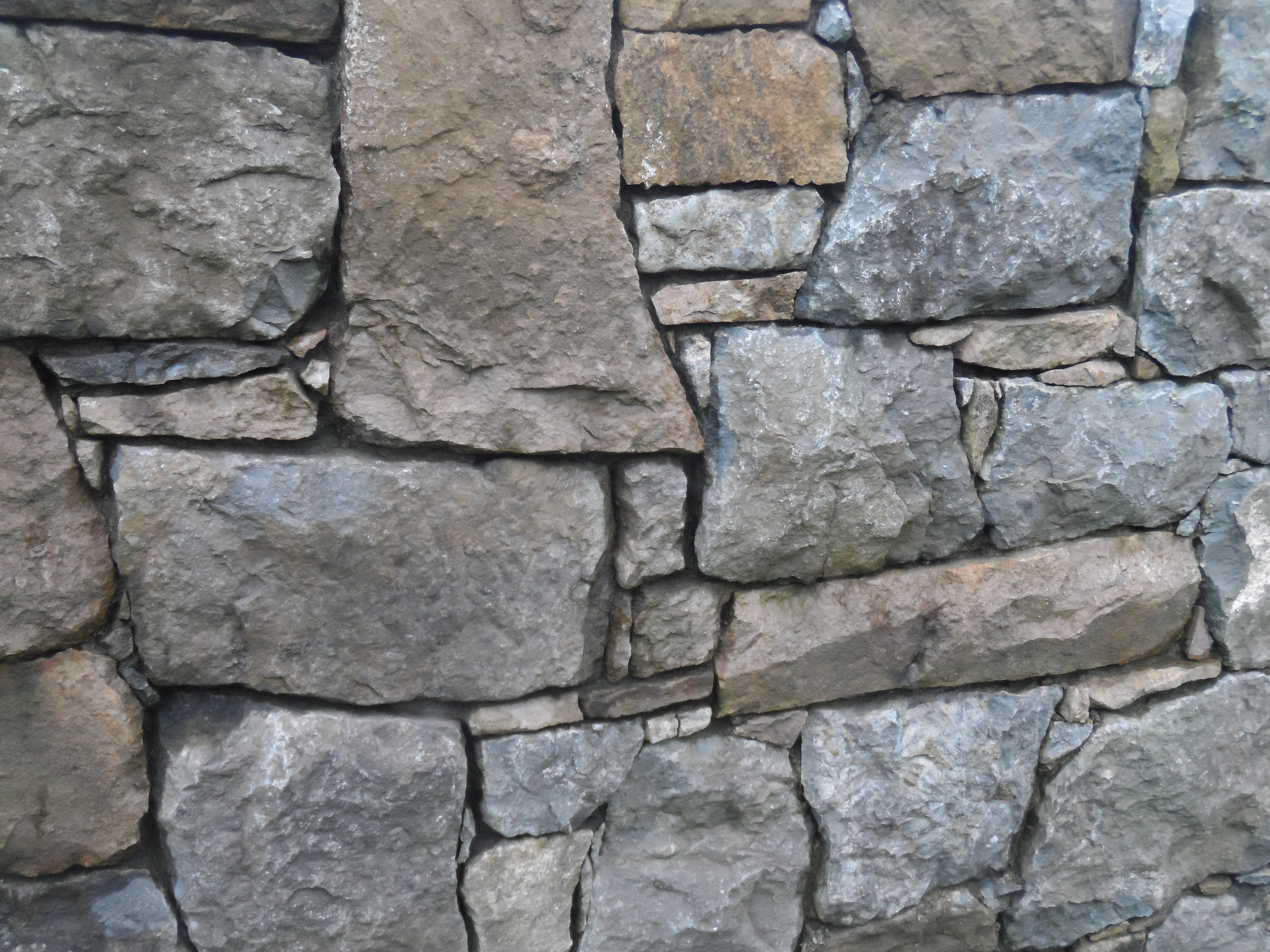
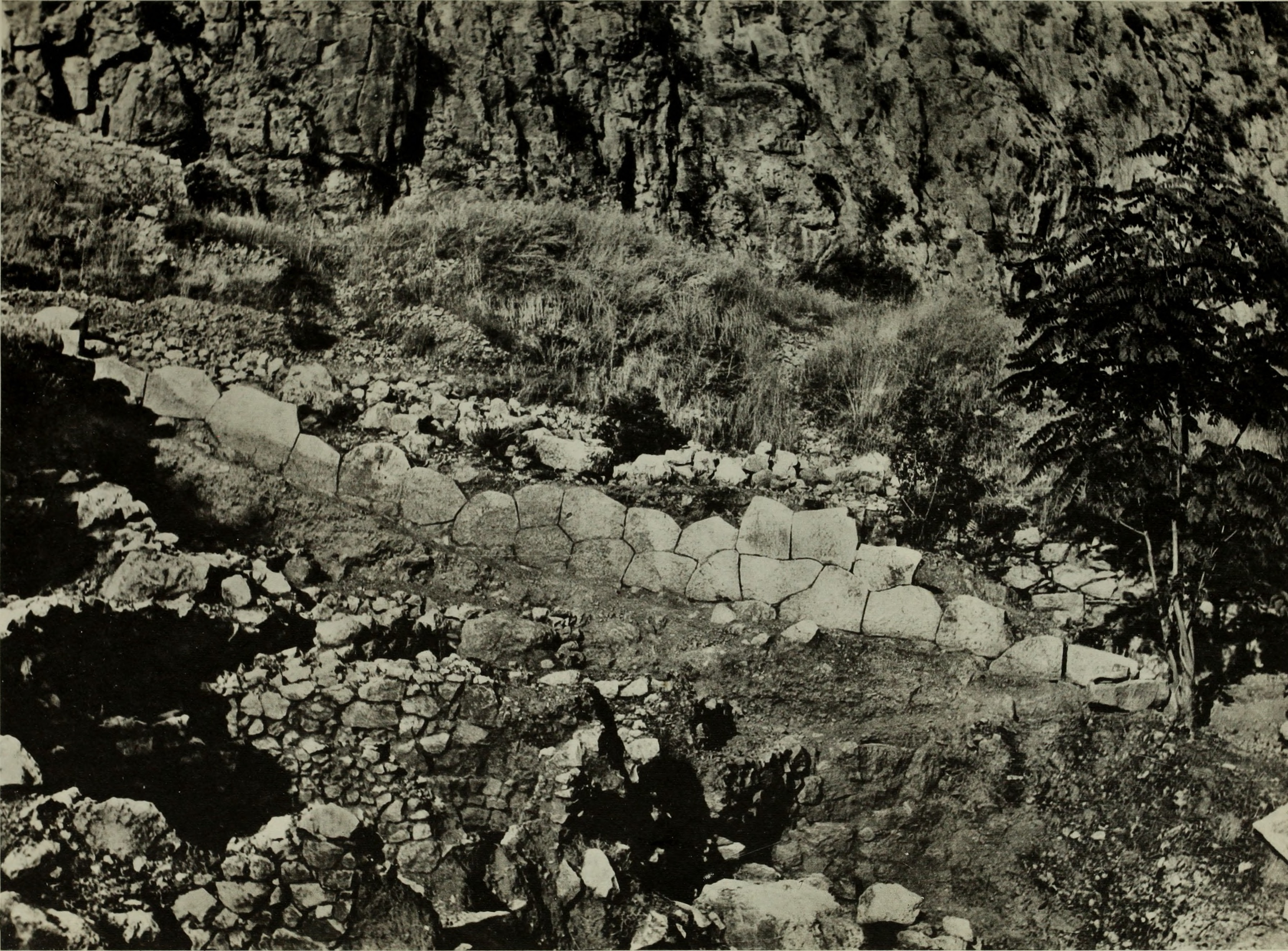
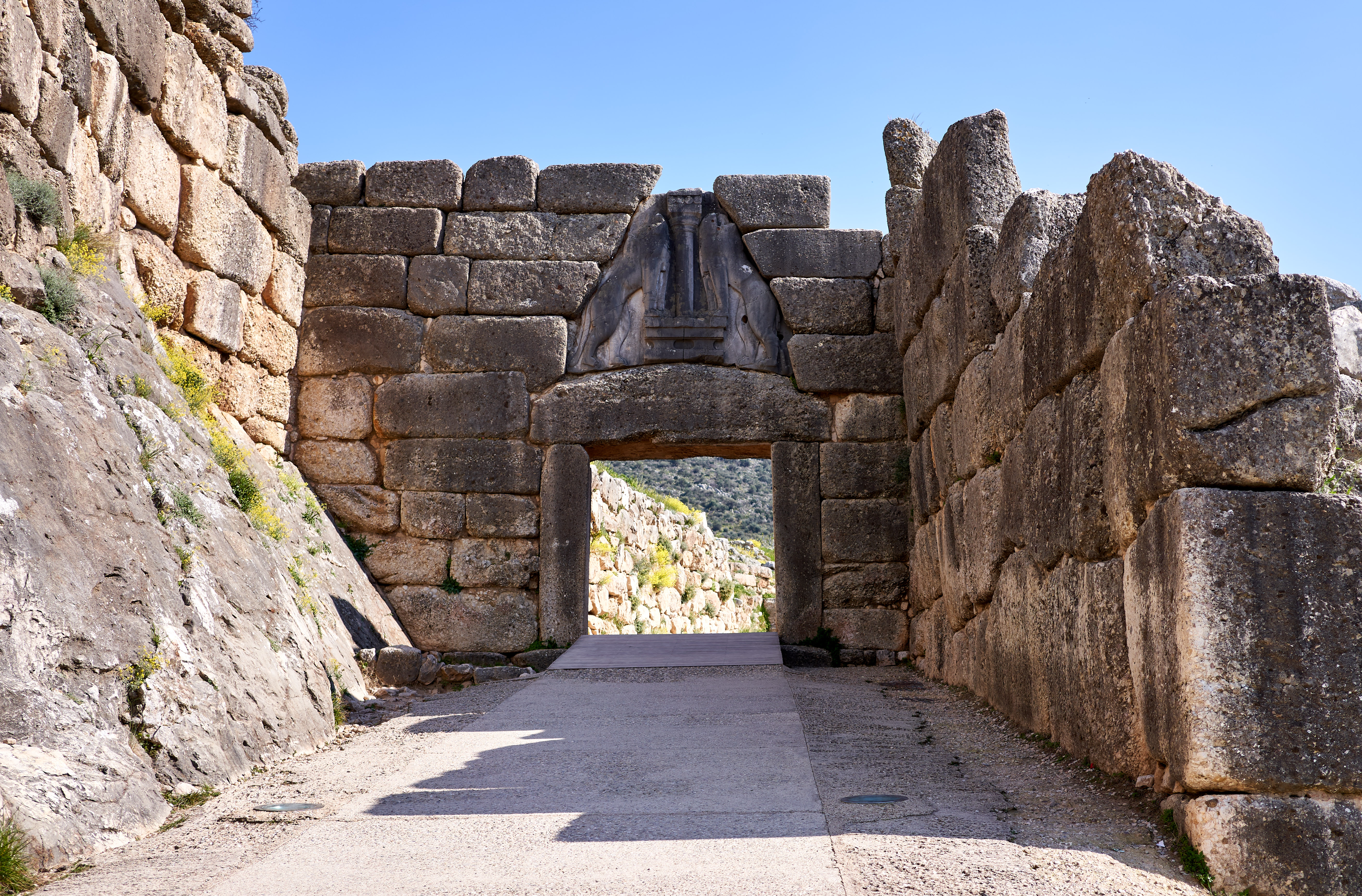
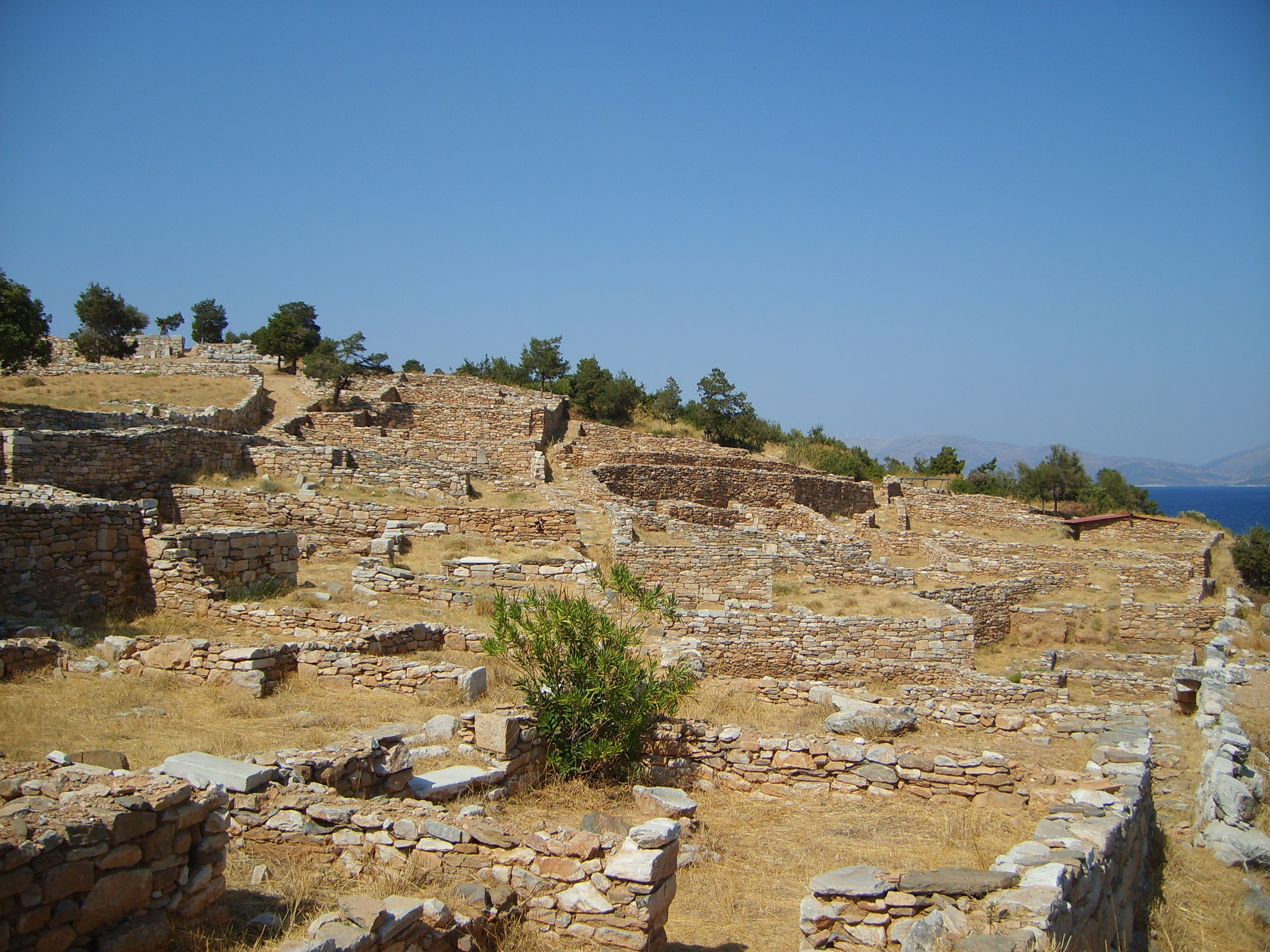
1	Stone wall, Ireland	The first style, which is the oldest, consists of unwrought stones of various sizes in which the gaps are, or were, filled with small stones.
2	A polygonal wall, excavated at Delphi in 1902	The second is characterized by polygonal stones, which fit against each other with precision.
3	The Lion Gate, at Mycenae, with equal-height courses of unequal-width stones	The third style is characterized by work made in courses and by stones of unequal size, but of the same height. This category includes structures in Phocis, Boeotia and Argolis, and the walls of Mycenae, the Lion Gate, and the Treasury of Atreus.
4	Walls at Ramnous, Attica; some are made of rectangular, but irregular stones (mix of types 1 and 4)	The fourth style is characterized by horizontal courses of masonry, not always of the same height, but of stones which are all rectangular. This style is common in Attica.

While Peck's first and possibly second and third styles conform to what archaeologists today would classify as cyclopean, the fourth now is referred to as ashlar and is not considered cyclopean. There is a more detailed description of the Cyclopean styles at the Perseus Project.

== Historical accounts ==
Pausanias described the Cyclopean walls of Mycenae and Tiryns:

There still remain, however, parts of the city wall [of Mycenae], including the gate, upon which stand lions. These, too, are said to be the work of the Cyclopes, who made for Proetus the wall at Tiryns. (2.16.5) Going on from here and turning to the right, you come to the ruins of Tiryns. ... The wall, which is the only part of the ruins still remaining, is a work of the Cyclopes made of unwrought stones, each stone being so big that a pair of mules could not move the smallest from its place to the slightest degree. Long ago small stones were so inserted that each of them binds the large blocks firmly together.(2.25.8)

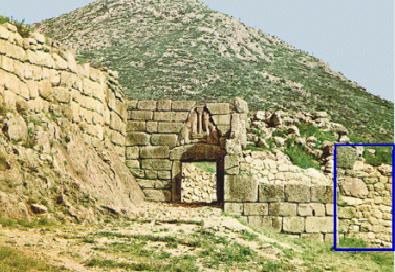
Difference between ashlar masonry (left) and Cyclopean masonry (right), shown in the blue rectangle; Lion Gate, Mycenae, 13th century BCE

Modern archaeologists use "Cyclopean" in a more restricted sense than the description by Pausanias; while Pausanias attributes all of the fortifications of Tiryns and Mycenae, including the Lion Gate, to the Cyclopes, only parts of these walls are built in Cyclopean masonry. The accompanying photograph shows the Lion Gate, highlighting the difference between Cyclopean masonry (shown in the blue rectangle) and the rectangular blocks of ashlar masonry.

== Locations of structures ==
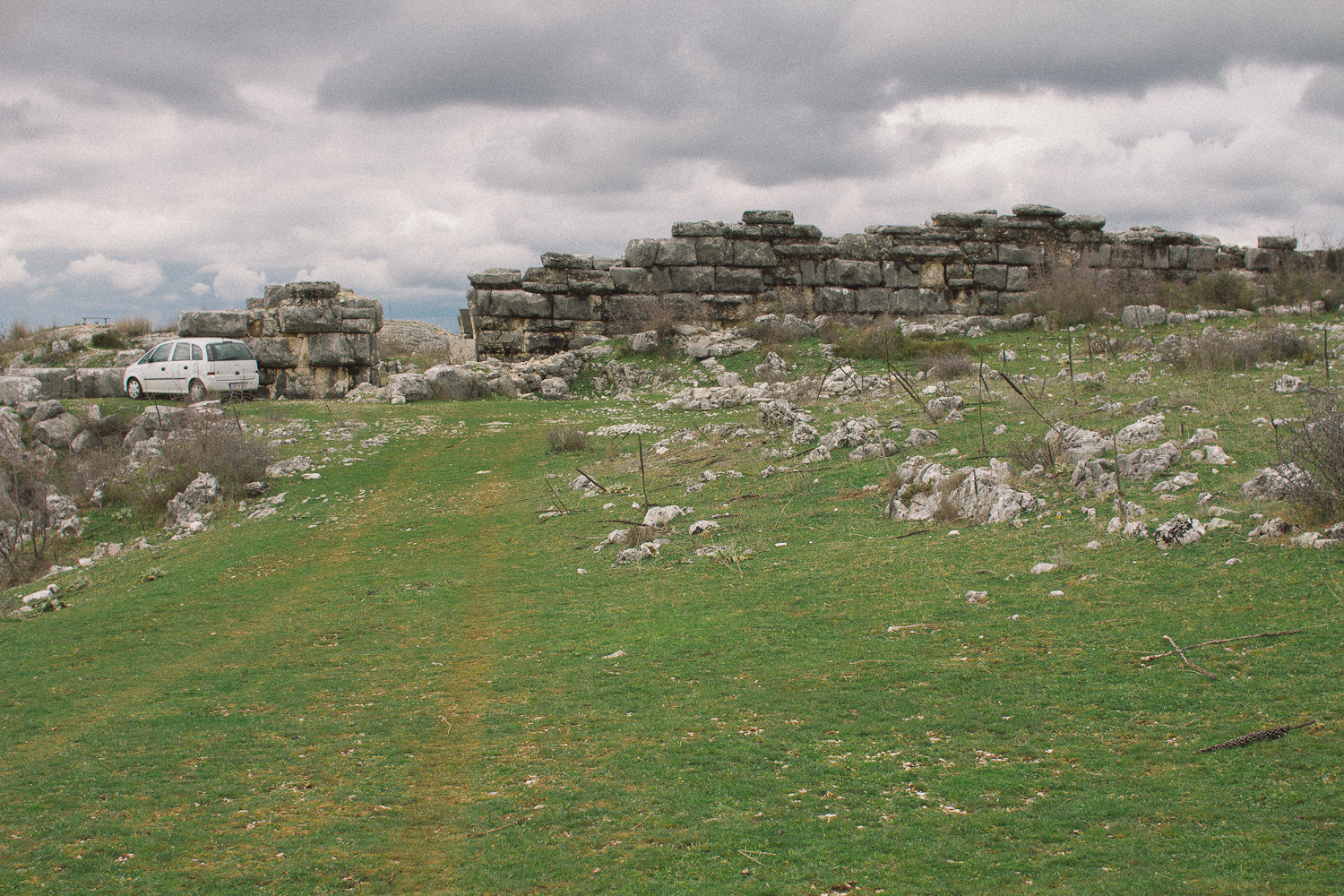
Daorson, Bosnia, built around a prehistoric central fortified settlement or acropolis (c. 17–16th to the end of the Bronze Age, c. 9–8th c. BCE), gate visible to the left, surrounded by cyclopean walls (similar to Mycenae) dated to the 4th c. BCE.

The entrance of a Mycenaean citadel in the Bronze Age, Lion Gate, demonstrated the monumentalizing occurring in Greece and showed the power of the citadel. Apart from the Tirynthian and Mycenaean walls, other Cyclopean structures include some beehive tombs in Greece and the fortifications of a number of Mycenaean sites, most famously at Gla.

In Cyprus, the Kition archaeological site in present-day Larnaca, has revealed cyclopean walls. Additionally, Nitovikla, Enkomi and Maa Paleokastro use Cyclopean masonry.

In Italy, polygonal masonry is particularly indicative of the region of Latium; scholars including Giuseppe Lugli have carried out studies of the technique. Some notable sites that have fortification walls built in this technique include Norba, Signia, Alatri, Boiano, Circeo, Cosa, Alba Fucens, Palestrina, Terracina and Santa Severa. One of the largest and least known is the "acropolis" in Alatri, an hour south of Rome. It also seems to have a portal through which the summer solstice sun shines and some think it is also has a number of other astronomical significant points to it. It is thought to be the second largest in Europe, after Athens. In Sicily, there are many Cyclopean structures especially in Erice, in the western part of the island. The Nuraghe of Bronze Age Sardinia also are described as being constructed in cyclopean masonry, as are some of the constructions of the Talaiot culture abounding on Menorca and present to a lesser extent on Mallorca.

== See also ==
- Dry stone
- Megalithic architecture
- Stone masonry
- Stone wall
