= Lucos Cozza =

Italian archaeologist (1921–2011)

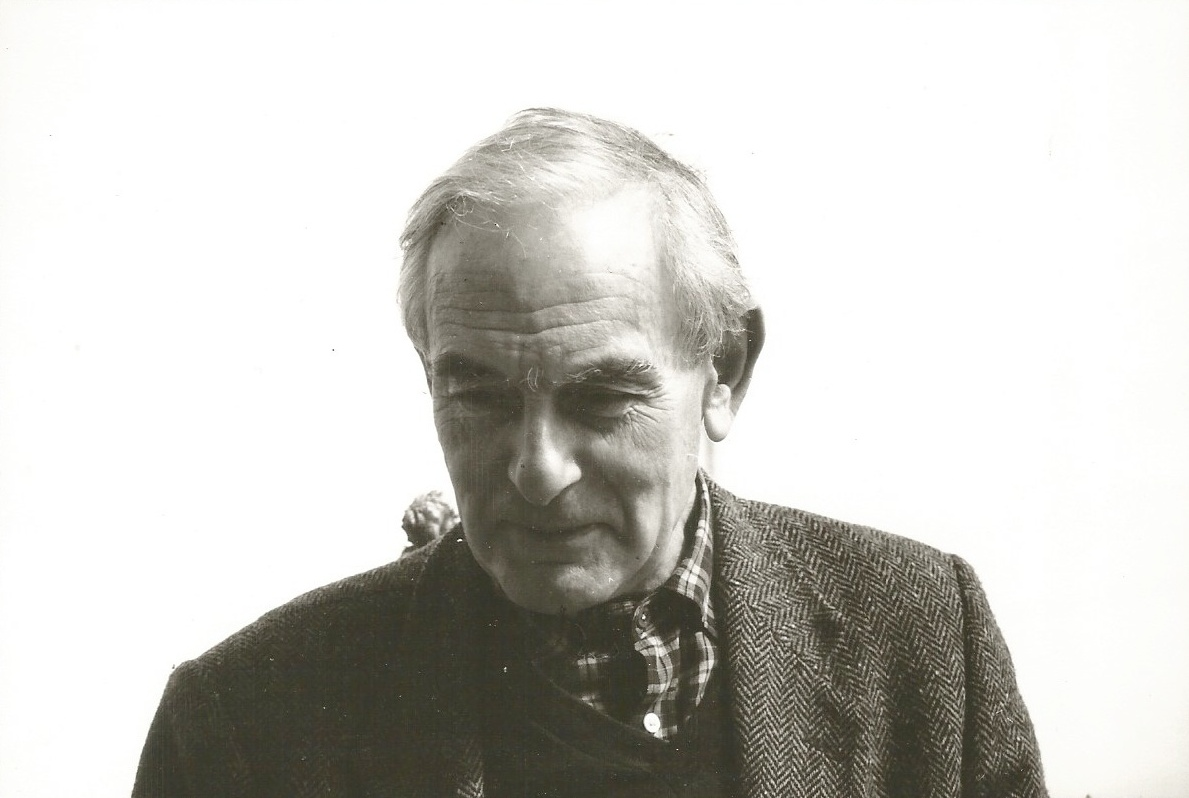
Lucos Cozza in 1990

Lucos Cozza (born in Rome, Italy, on 11 April 1921 – 27 June 2011) was an Italian Roman archaeologist.

Born in Rome, Cozza was the son of the sculptor, count Lorenzo Cozza (Orvieto 1877 - Roma 1965), and the grandson of archaeologist Adolfo Cozza (Orvieto 1848 - Roma 1910).

Cozza was a student of Giuseppe Lugli, the author of many scholarly books about Italian prehistory and the topography of Rome; his best-known work is on the Temple of Hadrian. He also wrote an archeological guide book to Roman antiquities, translated into several languages.

In 1957, he began the excavation, along with Ferdinando Castagnoli, of the Latin federal sanctuary at Lavinium.

== Academic publications ==
1. "Grottarossa (vocabolo Monte delle Grotte). Cisterna ad ogiva in opera quadrata." Notizie degli Scavi 8 s., 1, pp. 101–110, 1947.
2. ed. Fontes ad topographiam veteris urbis Romae pertinentes, vol. 1, Liber IV: Muri portaeque aureliani. Rome: Università di Roma, Istituto di topografia antica, 1952.
3. "Roma (Via Anagnina, vocabolo “Centroni Grotte”). "Natatio" nell'antica villa detta "dei Centroni"’". Notizie degli Scavi 8 s., 6, pp. 257-283, 1952.
4. (with F. Castagnoli). "L'angolo meridionale del Foro della Pace." BCom 76, pp. 119–142, 1956.
5. "Ricomposizione di alcuni rilievi di Villa Medici". BdA 4 s., 43, pp. 107–111, 1958.
6. "Tivoli (Monte Ripoli). Sito dell'antica Aefula." RendLinc, 8 s., 13, pp. 248–250, 1958.
7. Roma antica: guida visiva del centro monumentale. Rome, s.l. ed, 196?.
8. (with R. A. Staccioli). Roma com’era e come è: ricostruzioni del centro monumentale di Roma antica. Rome: Vision.
9. (with G. Carettoni, A.M. Colini e G. Gatti). La pianta marmorea di Roma antica. Forma Urbis Romae. Rome: X Ripartizione del Comune di Roma, 1960.
10. (ed.). Il nuovo Centro Esattoriale di Roma. Rome: Editalia, 1961.
11. (with A.M. Colini). "Il compitum del vicus Cornicularius," in Ludus Magnus. Rome: Monte dei Paschi di Siena, pp. 147–150, 1962.
12. Epigrafi inedite, in Ludus Magnus (con A.M. Colini), Roma, Monte dei Paschi di Siena, pp. 151–154, 1962
13. Ludus Magnus (con A.M. Colini), Roma, Monte dei Paschi di Siena, 1962
14. EAA VI, s.v. Mura Aureliane, pp. 797–799, 1965
15. A guide to the monumental centre of ancient Rome with reconstructions of the monuments (con R.A. Staccioli, traduzione di J.B. Ward Perkins), Roma, Vision, 1966
16. La città di Castro, tutta da scavare (con O. Mazzucato), ArcheologiaRoma, 7, n. 47, pp. 386
17. Monumenti all'inferno. Barbarano Romano, ArcheologiaRoma, 7, n. 47, pp. 358–359, 1968
18. Pianta marmorea severiana: nuove ricomposizioni di frammenti, Studi di topografia romana, Quaderni dell’Istituto di topografia antica della Università di Roma 5, pp. 9–22, 1968
19. Passeggiata sulle mura. Tratto da Porta San Sebastiano ai fornici della Cristoforo Colombo. 21 aprile 1970, Roma, Tipografia Operaia Romana, 1970
20. Passeggiata sulle mura. Da Porta Latina a Porta San Sebastiano e Museo delle Mura, fino ai fornici della Cristoforo Colombo. 21 aprile 1971, Roma, Tipografia Operaia Romana, 1971
21. Storia della carta archeologica d’Italia (1881-1897), in Carta archeologica d'Italia, 1881-1897: materiali per l'Etruria e la Sabina, Forma Italiae 2 s., Documenti 1, Firenze, Olschki, pp. 429–459, 1972
22. Le carte archeologiche strumento indispensabile per la tutela storico-ambientale. Mostra allestita in occasione della Settimana dei Musei, Roma, Soprintendenza alle antichità dell'Etruria meridionale, 1974
23. I recenti scavi delle Sette Sale, RendPontAc 47, pp. 79–101, 1974
24. Il modello del Tempio di Alatri (con appendice di A. Zevi Gallina), BLazioMerid, 8, n. 2, pp. 117–136, 1975
25. Una soluzione del tetto del tempio etrusco, RendPontAc 48, pp. 87–94, 1975
26. Le tredici are, Roma, De Luca, pp. 89–174, 1976
27. Il restauro delle mura, Roma Comune 1, supplemento al n. 6/7, pp. 1–4, 1977
28. Centro circoscrizionale polivalente nel complesso della Fornace Veschi (con E. Tempesta, F. Finzi e G. Ruggieri), in La città dei fili: proposte di riuso degli spazi urbani, Ciampino, Ex cantina sociale, 1980
29. Il parco archeologico dell’Appia Antica, in La Residenza imperiale di Massenzio: villa, circo e mausoleo. Contributo al parco archeologico della via Appia Antica, mostra documentaria, Roma, Palombi, pp. 11–12, 1980
30. La Residenza imperiale di Massenzio: villa, circo e mausoleo. Contributo al parco archeologico della via Appia Antica, mostra documentaria (a cura di, con G. Pisani Sartorio, G. Ioppolo, R. De Angelis Bertolotti), Roma, Palombi, 1980
31. Introduzione (con R. D’Erme), in Carta archeologica d’Italia (1881-1897): materiali per l’agro Falisco, Forma Italiae 2 s., Documenti 2, Firenze, Olschki, pp. vii-xiv, 1981
32. La decorazione (con M. Cipollone), in Tempio di Adriano (a cura di), Roma, De Luca, pp. 16–27, 1982
33. Notizie storiche. Le mura di Roma. Porta Metronia. Da Porta Metronia a Porta Latina’, in Avanguardia Transavanguardia 68, 77, Mura Aureliane, maggio-luglio 1982 [brochure della mostra], Roma, Tipografia Operaia Romana, 1982
34. Le scanalature delle colonne (con A. Claridge), in Tempio di Adriano, Roma, De Luca, pp. 27–32, 1982
35. Tempio di Adriano (a cura di), Roma, De Luca, 1982
36. Intervento archeologico all’arco di Settimio Severo (et Alii), in Roma Archeologia e Progetto, Roma, Multigrafica, pp. 52–54, 1983
37. Le mura di Aureliano dai crolli nella Roma capitale ai restauri di un secolo dopo, in L'archeologia in Roma capitale tra sterro e scavo, Venezia, Marsilio, pp. 130–139, 1983
38. Un nuovo ritratto di Cesare, AnalRom 12, pp. 64–69, 1983
39. Le tegole di marmo del Pantheon, AnalRom, Supplementum 10, pp. 109–118, 1983
40. Zona archeologica del Colle Oppio. Idee per il progetto di un parco (con K. de Fine Licht), in Roma archeologia e progetto, Roma, Multigrafica, p. 115, 1983
41. Arco di Settimio Severo’ (con A. Claridge), in Roma archeologia nel centro 1, L’area archeologica centrale, Roma, De Luca, pp. 34–40, 1985
42. Colle Oppio (con K. de Fine Licht, C. Panella e R. Motta), in Roma archeologia nel centro 2, La “città murata”, Roma, De Luca, pp. 467–486, 1985
43. La grande pianta di Falerii esposta nel Museo di Villa Giulia, OpRom 15, pp. 17–46, 1985
44. I resti archeologici visibili nel sottosuolo: necessità di conoscerli e registrarli’, in Roma archeologia nel centro 2, La “città murata”, Roma, De Luca, pp. 308–312, 1985
45. Su una pianta dell'area archeologica centrale di Roma (1870 ca.)’, BSR 53, pp. 343-345, 1985
46. Sulla pendenza del clivo Capitolino (con A. Claridge e G. Ioppolo), in Roma archeologia nel centro 1, L’area archeologica centrale, Roma, De Luca, pp. 17-18, 1985
47. Mura Aureliane, 1. Trastevere, il braccio settentrionale: dal Tevere a Porta Aurelia-S. Pancrazio’, BCom 91, pp. 103–130, 1986
48. Mura Aureliane, 2. Trastevere, il braccio meridionale: dal Tevere a Porta Aurelia-S. Pancrazio’, BCom 92, pp. 137–174, 1987
49. Osservazioni sulle mura aureliane a Roma, AnalRom 16, pp. 25–52, 1987
50. Appunti per villa Esmeade’, BStorArt 31, n. 1-4, pp. 47–52, 1988
51. Carta storica archeologica monumentale e paesistica del suburbio e dell'agro romano (con E. Tempesta, X Ripartizione AA. BB. AA. Ufficio Carta dell'Agro), Roma, Comune di Roma, 1988
52. Ferdinando Castagnoli, 1917-1988, BSR 57, pp. xi-xiv, 1989
53. Guglielmo Gatti, Roma (29-9-1905/2-9-1981)’, in Topografia ed edilizia di Roma antica: ristampa anastatica di tutti gli articoli di Guglielmo Gatti pubblicati dal 1934 al 1979, Roma, "L'Erma" di Bretschneider, pp. vii-x, 1989
54. Roma. Le mura Aureliane dalla Porta Flaminia al Tevere, BSR 57, pp. 1–5, 1989
55. Sul frammento 212 della Pianta marmorea, JRA 2, pp. 117–119, 1989
56. Adonaea nella Pianta marmorea severiana, AnalRom 19, pp. 233–237, 1990
57. Passeggiata sulle mura, Roma, Graf 3, 1990
58. Sulla Porta Appia, JRA 3, pp. 169–171, 1990
59. Trastevere. Viale Trastevere, Mura Aureliane, BA, 1-2, pp. 189–190
60. Mura di Roma dalla Porta Flaminia alla Pinciana, AnalRom 20, pp. 93–138, 1992
61. L'opera di Thomas Ashby e gli acquedotti di Roma’ (con A. Claridge), in Il trionfo dell'acqua. Atti del convegno "Gli antichi acquedotti di Roma, problemi di conoscenza, conservazione e tutela", Roma, Comune di Roma, A.C.E.A., pp. 13–17, 1992
62. Mura di Roma dalla Porta Pinciana alla Salaria, AnalRom 21, pp. 81–139, 1993
63. Bibliografia topografica della colonizzazione greca in Italia e nelle isole tirreniche XII, s.v. Nepi, pp. 323–332, 1993
64. Mura di Roma dalla Porta Salaria alla Nomentana, AnalRom 22, pp. 61–95, 1994
65. Disegni per ... Pratica di Mare: un omaggio a Ferdinando Castagnoli (con C.F. Giuliani, a cura di A. Zarattini), Roma, Soprintendenza archeologica per il Lazio, 1995
66. Arthur Dale Trendall (1909-1995), RendPontAc 70, pp. 321–322, 1997
67. Mura di Roma dalla Porta Nomentana alla Tiburtina, AnalRom 25, pp. 7–113, 1997
68. Riflessioni su Antonio Maria Colini e il suburbio di Roma, RendPontAc 70, pp. 263–265, 1997
69. Arvid Andrén (1902-1999)’, RendPontAc 71, pp. 349–352, 1998
70. Lo stemma Cozza, in L'abate Giuseppe Cozza-Luzi archeologo, liturgista, filologo: atti della giornata di studio, Bolsena, 6 maggio 1995, Grottaferrata, Monastero Esarchico, pp. 1–3, 1998
71. Guido Achille Mansuelli (1916-2001), (con G. Sassatelli e D. Scagliarini), RendPontAc 73, pp. 339–350, 2000
72. Adolfo Cozza (con P. Tamburini e C. Benocci), Orvieto, Fondazione Cassa di Risparmio di Orvieto, Perugia, Quattroemme, 2002
73. Navalia (con P.L. Tucci), ArchCl, n.s. 7, 57, pp. 175–202, 2006
74. Mura di Roma dalla Porta Latina all'Appia, BSR 76, pp. 99–154, 2008
75. La Porta Asinaria in un disegno del XVI secolo, RendPontAc 81, pp. 607–611, 2009
  - Robert Coates-Stephens, Lavinia Cozza, and Lucos Cozza. Lexicon topographicum urbis Romae. Supplementum VII, scritti in onore di Lvcos Cozza. Rome: Edizioni Quasar, 2014. ISBN 9788871405551.
76. Adolfo Cozza by P Tamburini; Carla Benocci; Lucos Cozza Luzi: Ponte San Giovanni, Perugia : Quattroemme, ©2002.
77. L'abate Giuseppe Cozza-Luzi : archeologo, liturgista, filologo : atti della giornata di studio, Bolsena, 6 maggio 1995
78. Studi di topografia romana in onore di Antonio M. Colini in occasione del suo 65e anno. by Antonio Maria Colini : Roma : De Luca, 1968.
79. Disegni per ... Pratica di Mare: un omaggio a Ferdinando Castagnoli by Cairoli Fulvio Giuliani; Ferdinando Castagnoli; Lucos Cozza; Annalisa Zarattini; Italy. Soprintendenza archeologica per il Lazio Roma : Soprintendenza archeologica per il Lazio, 1995.

== Guidebooks ==
- Lucos Cozza: Roma antica. Visual guide to the monumental centre, Rome, Vision, s.d. (195.?)
  - Published also in German as: Lucos Cozza; Romolo A. Staccioli: Rom wie es war und wie es ist: illustrierter Führer durch Rom: einst und jetzt, Roma: Vision Verlag, 1955
  - Published also in French as:
    - Lucos Cozza; Romolo Augusto Staccioli; Paolo C. Ianni: Roma autrefois et aujourd'hui. Guide avec reconstruction des principaux monuments, Roma, Vision, s.d. (195.?)
    - Lucos Cozza; Romolo Augusto Staccioli; Paolo C. Ianni: Roma antica. Guide illustrée des principaux monuments de l'ancienne Rome reconstituées, Roma, Vision, s.d. (196.?)

== Necrology ==
1. Paolo Sommella - Lavinia Cozza, Un ritratto di Lucos, in Unione internazionale degli istituti di Archeologia Storia e Storia dell’Arte in Roma, Annuario 2012-2013, n. 54, pagg. 477-481.
2. F. Cairoli Giuliani, Lucos Cozza Luzi (1921 - 2011) in Atti della Pontificia Accademia romana di archeologia. Rendiconti LXXXIV, 2013, serie III, pag 587.
