= Antonio Maria Colini =

Antonio Maria Colini (1900 in Rome, Italy – 1989 in Rome, Italy) was a Roman archaeologist who studied, among other topics, the Severan marble plan of Rome known as the Forma Urbis Romae. He was part of the group of scholars associated with Italo Gismondi.

Colini, together with Lucos Cozza, worked on the excavation of the Ludus Magnus at Rome (see Ludus Magnus Rome, 1962). He also excavated in the Area Sacra di Sant'Omobono in Rome in 1937, and after the second world war.

Colini was also a student and protégé of Giulio Quirino Giglioli and, like Giglioli, he was a fascist and supported many of the fascist cultural programs in Italy.

== Bibliography ==
- (IT) "Antonio M. Colini" in AA.VV., Biografie e bibliografie degli Accademici Lincei, Roma, Acc. dei Lincei, 1976, pp. 853–855.
