= Ludus Dacicus =

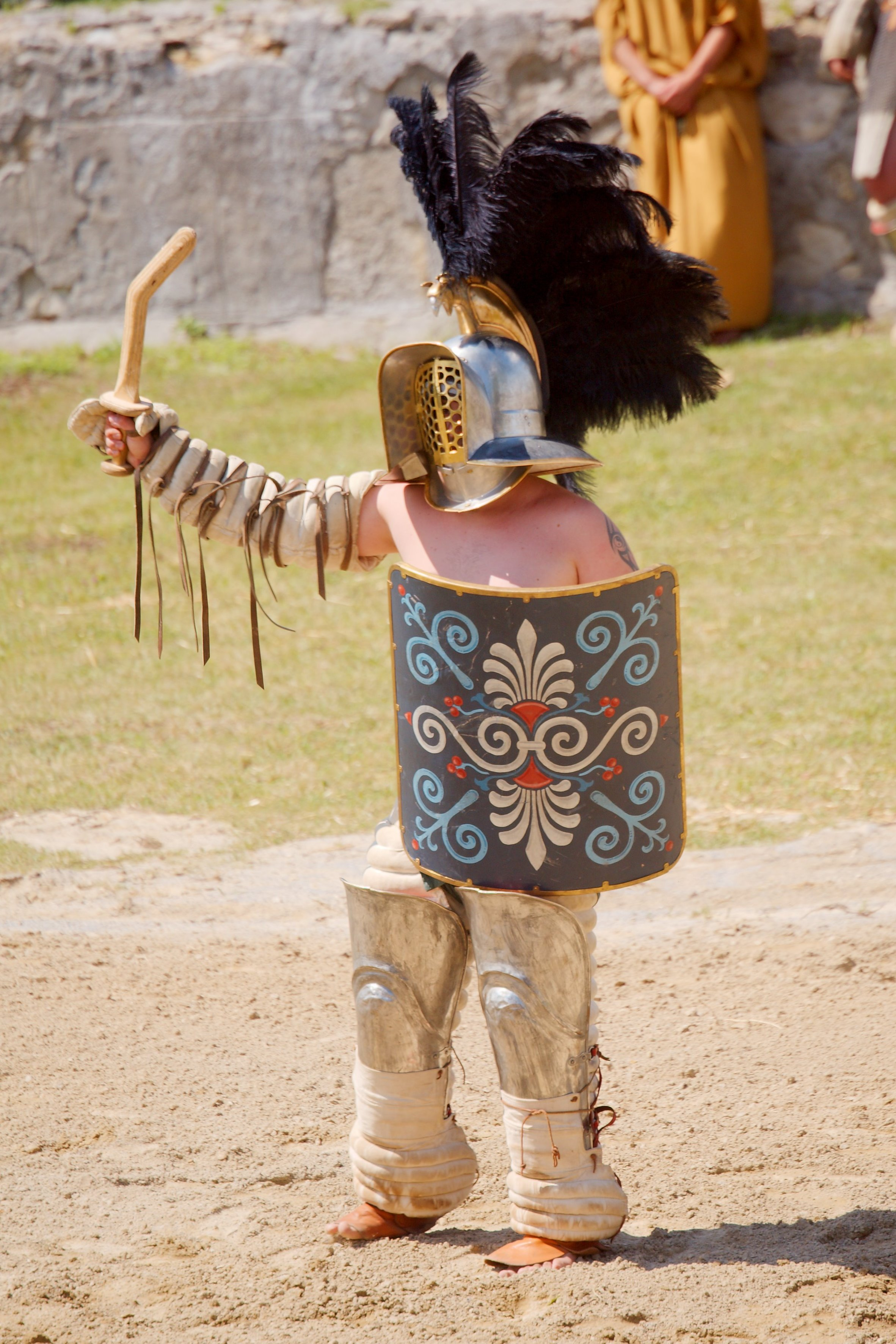
Thraex gladiator with wooden sica, a weapon known to have been used by the Dacians along with the falx.

The Ludus Dacicus or The Dacian Gladiatorial Training School was one of the four gladiator training schools (ludi) in Ancient Rome. It was founded by Domitian (r. 81–96), completed by Trajan (r. 98–117), and was used to train gladiators drawn from among the Dacian prisoners taken by both emperors in their Dacian Wars. It was located east of the Colosseum, on the slopes of the Caelian Hill.

== History ==
Dacian prisoners were taken many times by the Romans and very often they were forced to fight in the arenas. Dio Cassius mentions that around 31 BC, after the Battle of Actium, where the Dacian king Dicomes provided help to Mark Antony, Augustus took the Dacian prisoners and made them fight in the arena as gladiators, against Suebi captives, a spectacle that lasted many days with no interruption.

== See also ==
- Ludus Magnus
- Falx
- Dacian warfare
