= Nitovikla =

Archaeological site in Cyprus

Coordinates: 35°29′39″N 34°16′59″E

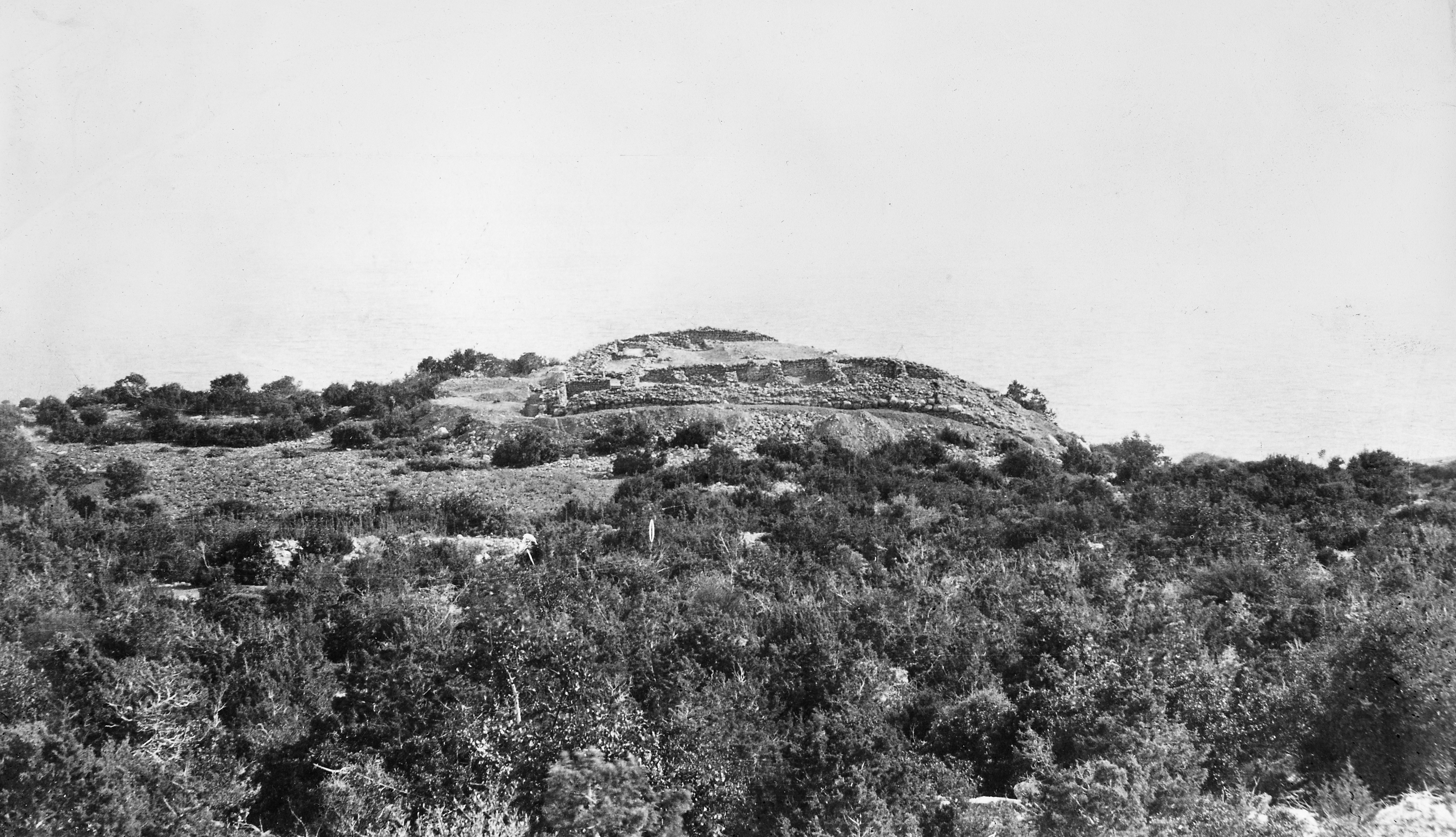
Photo taken from northwest during the Swedish Cyprus expedition.

Nitovikla is an archaeological site of a fortress located in the Karpas Peninsula. The Swedish Cyprus Expedition investigated the area in 1929, they discovered tombs dating to the Middle Cypriot III (1725-1600 BC) and excavated the fortress. The fortress was built on a hill that overlooked the plateau and it was made with Cyclopean masonry, it had a square shape with towers in three of the corners and flanking the entrance. It had an internal courtyard with a water cistern. The fort was used between the Middle Cypriot III and the Late Cypriot I (1725-1450 BC) periods. The excavation was published in 1935.

== See also ==
- Prehistoric Cyprus
