= Forma Italiae =

Forma Italiae is a project whose aim it is to compile a complete archaeological map and gazetteer of Italy.

Giuseppe Lugli was the founder of the project. Thus far, 46 volumes have appeared as of 2017. The volumes are published by Leo S. Olschki Editore in Florence, Italy. From volume 46, the series is published by Edizioni Quasar. The current director of the project is Luisa Migliorati of the "Sapienza" Università di Roma.
