= Ludus Magnus =

Ancient Roman gladiatorial school

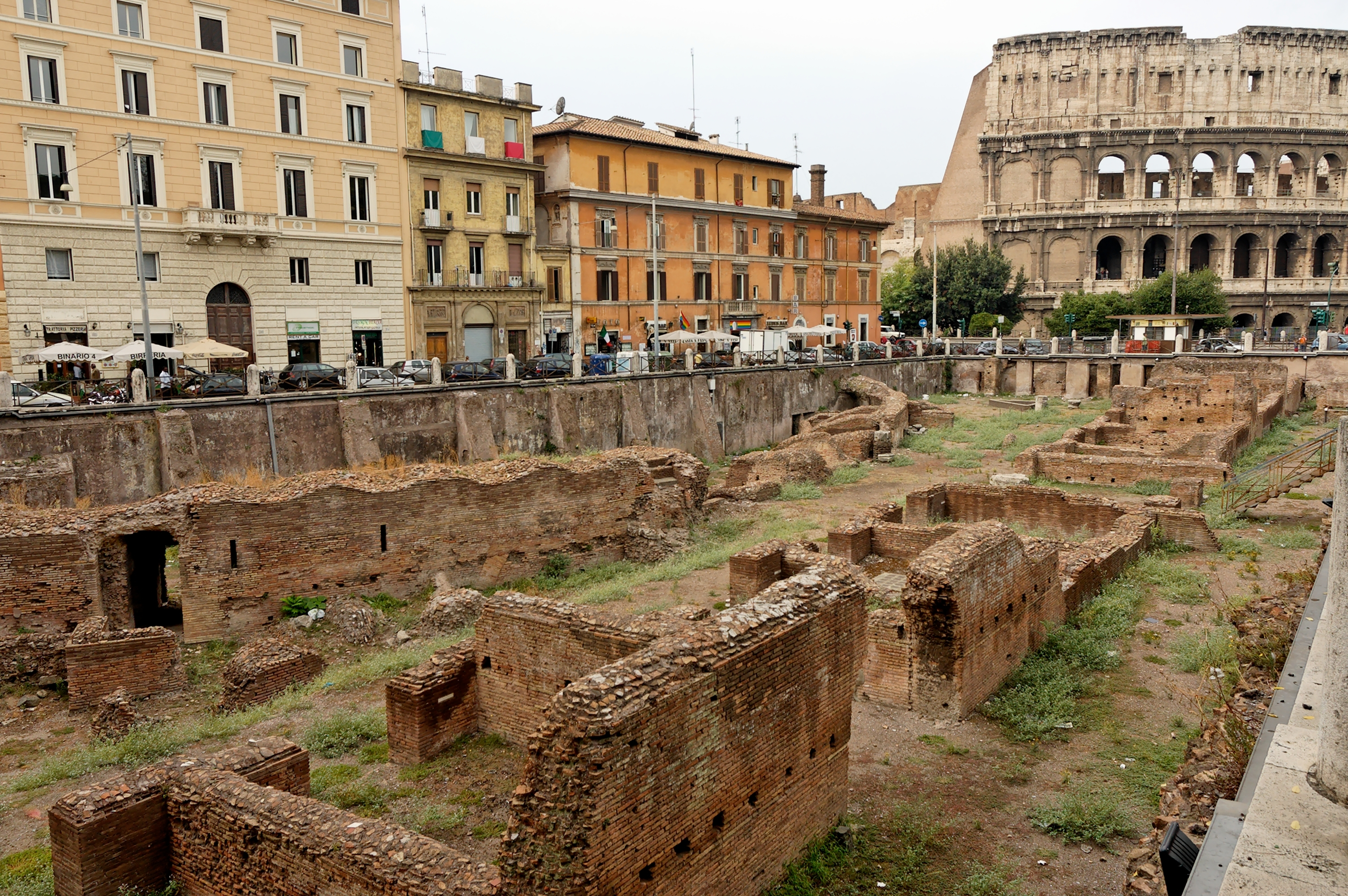
- Barracks for gladiators

- Shown within Augustan Rome
- Interactive map of Ludus Magnus
- 41°53′24″N 12°29′42″E

The Ludus Magnus (lat.:Domus Vectiliana), also known as the Great Gladiatorial Training School, was the largest of the gladiatorial schools in Rome. It was built by the emperor Domitian (r. 81–96 A.D.) in the late first century A.D., alongside other building projects undertaken by him such as three other gladiatorial schools across the Roman Empire.

The training school is situated directly east of the Colosseum in the valley between the Esquiline and the Caelian hills, an area already occupied by Republican and Augustan structures. While there are remains that are visible today, they belong to a reconstruction that took place under the emperor Trajan (r. 98–117) where the Ludus plane was raised by about 1.5 metres (4 ft 11 in).

The Ludus Magnus was essentially a gladiatorial arena where gladiators from across the Roman Empire would live, eat, and practice while undergoing gladiatorial training in preparation for fighting at the gladiatorial games held at the Colosseum. The Colosseum was where Gladiators would go to fight their opposition.

== Etymology ==
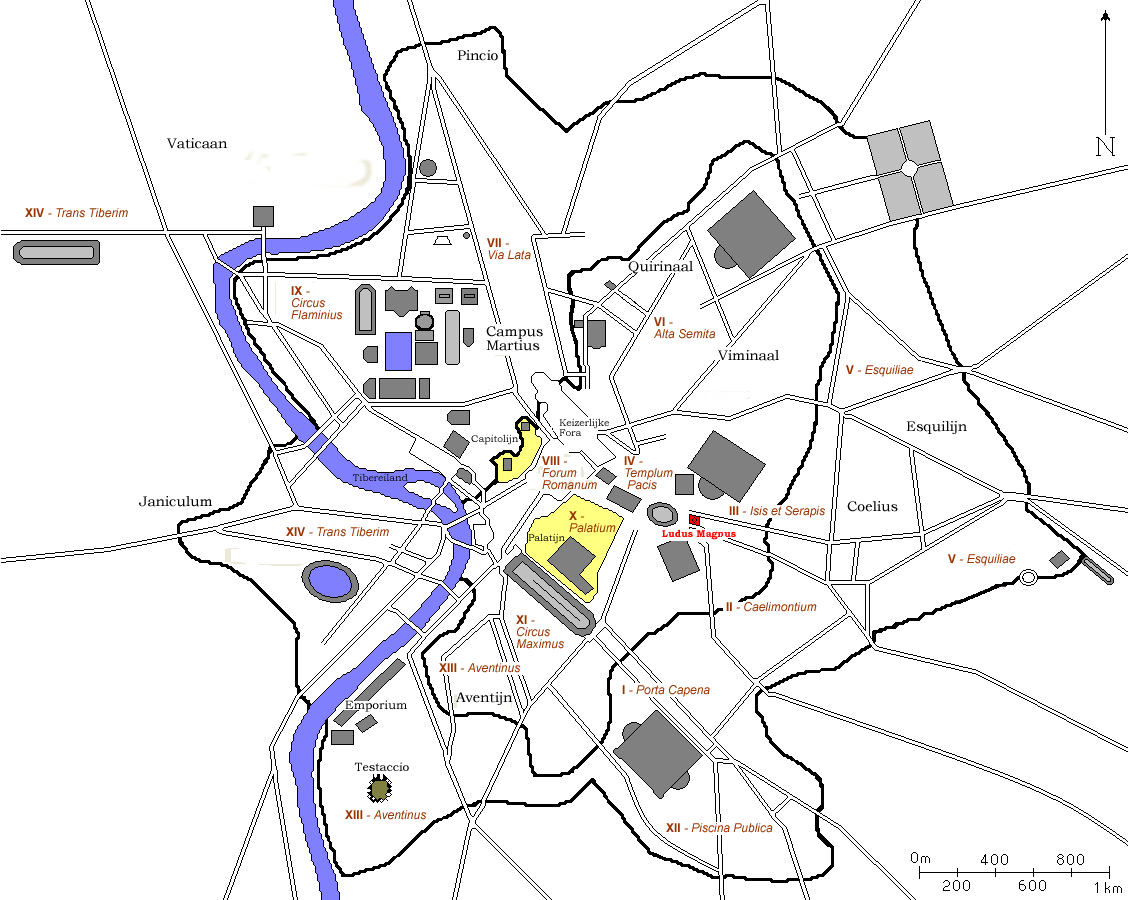
Plan Rome - Ludus Magnus

=== Location ===
The Ludus Magnus was situated directly to the east of the Colosseum in order to provide gladiators with accessibility to their main fighting venue. Though it is not aligned axially to the Colosseum, it does lie just north of it along the square of the Colosseum between the ancient Via Labicana and Via Di S. Giovanni.

The Ludus Magnus was located in order to connect those two buildings, through an underground gallery linking the two buildings. A path with an entrance 22.17 ft wide which began underneath the amphitheater reached the Ludus at its southwestern corner.

=== Purpose ===
The Ludus Magnus functioned as the leading gladiatorial school in Rome. The Romans used the same word ludi to denote gladiatorial games, as well as the schools which saw to the practice of such games. It was meant to be a place for gladiators from around the world to practice fighting techniques, such as training for venatio. Upon arriving to the ludus, gladiators would be separated based on their fighting specialty and then assigned a doctore for their specialty, as well as placed under the general oversight of a lanista. It is here that the gladiators would eat, train, and sleep on a regular basis.

The training portion of their days was extensive but also public. As was customary, the Romans often watched the gladiators train as we know that the seating provided at this ludus accommodated approximately 3,000 spectators. This effectively served as a sort of precursor to the games, a taste of what was to come at the Ludi Romani.

== History ==
=== Classical ===
The Ludus Magnus was constructed under the reign of emperor Domitian during the late first century AD. He also erected three other ludi around the same time (such as the Dacian, Gallic, and Matutinus or Morning School), though the Ludus Magnus was the largest of the four training schools that Domitian erected in the area surrounding the Colosseum.

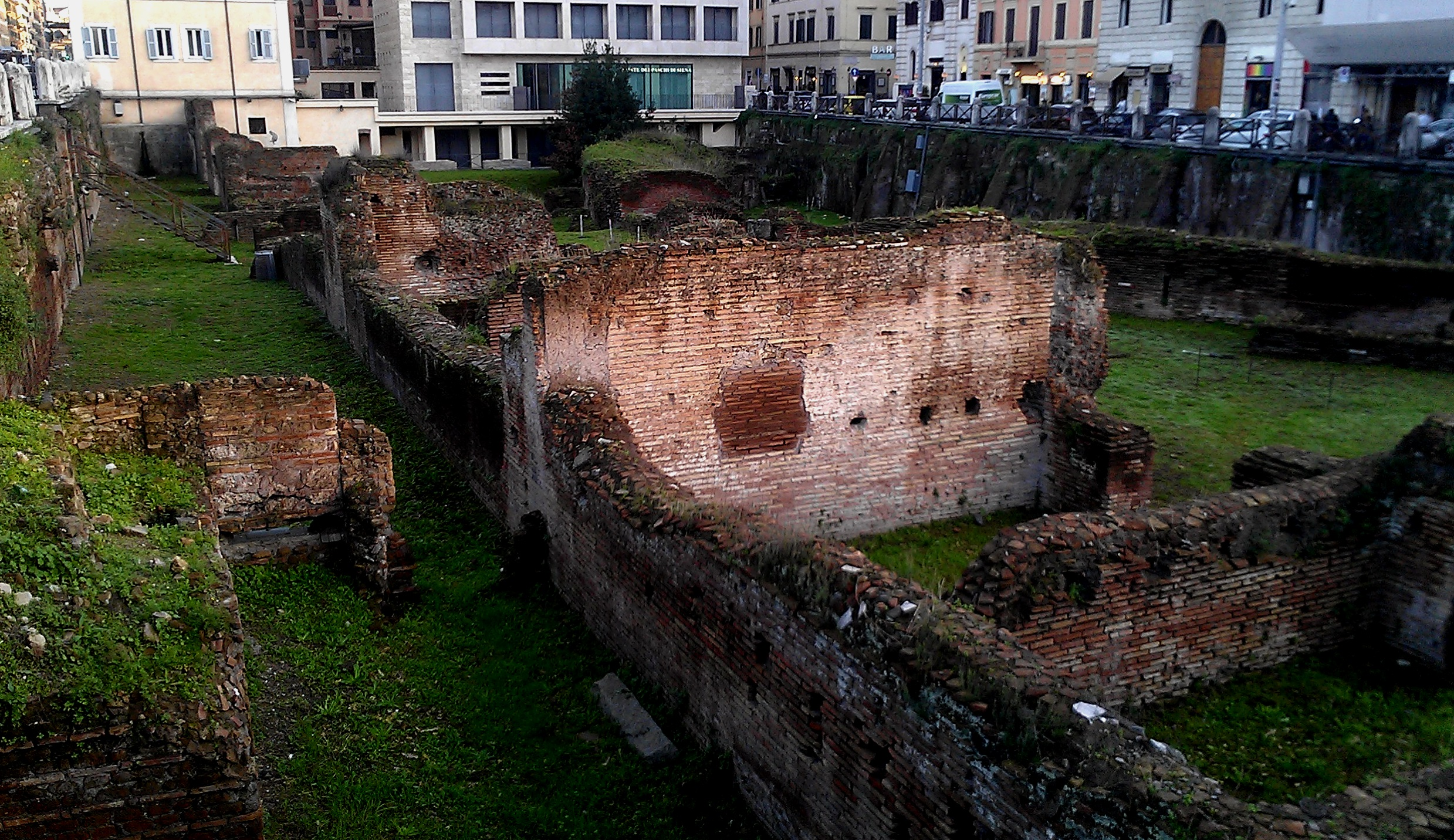
The Ludus Magnus as seen from its north-western end

The Ludus Magnus underwent various reconstructions under succeeding emperors during the Roman Empire. For instance, changes were undertaken under Trajan so that the pavement level was raised by 1.4 m providing us with the structure that can be seen today. Hadrian also added certain refinements as the structure suffered fire damage in the late second century. And then Caracalla also saw to some repairs and modifications during his reign, with other additions occurring under unclear patronage throughout the active life of the Ludus Magnus.

In late antiquity the gladiatorial school, along with the Colosseum, largely went out of use due to a lack of need in society for gladiatorial games as a form of entertainment when gladiatorial combat was outlawed in the fifth century AD. The building was abandoned in the sixth century when the space was then used to house a small cemetery. By the middle of the sixth century, the area was no longer cared for and numerous churches were built, as the population continued to decrease.

=== Post-Classical ===
The structural remains were rediscovered in 1937 during construction work taking place near the Colosseum, though excavations did not occur until 1957–61. Situated between the Via Labicana and Via di S. Giovanni in Laterano, excavations were carried out for less than half of the overall building. However, in light of the educated assumption that the structure was largely symmetrical and additional help from the marble plan, a restored plan for the entire structure has been postulated.

== Architecture ==
Access points would have been located along the Via Labicana whereby one descended steps to the level of the arena floor below street level.

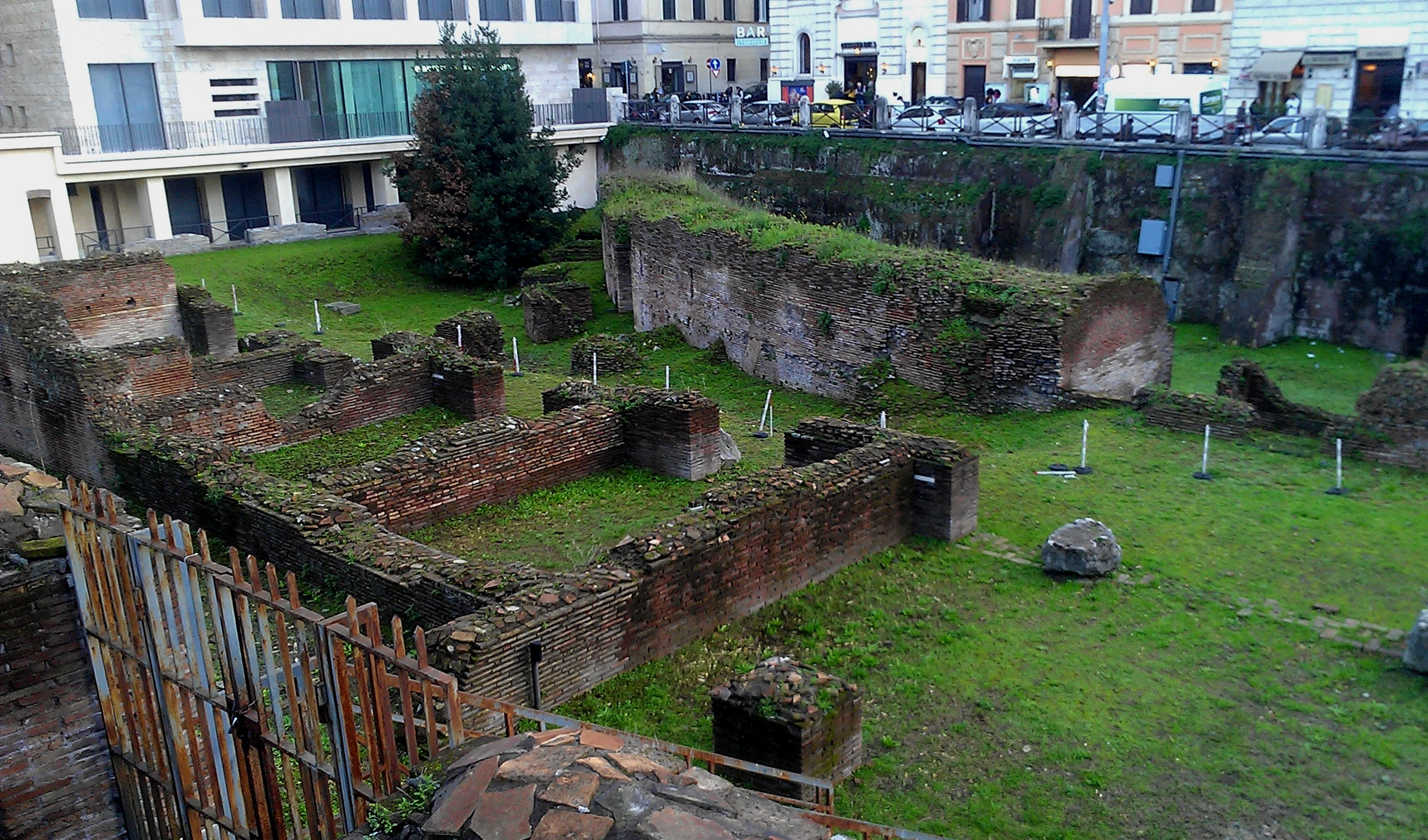
The eastern end of the Ludus Magnus

There was a central courtyard which served as arena space and was surrounded by Tuscan style colonnades on all four sides, with fountains flanking each corner.

At the centre of the Ludus Magnus there was an ellipsoidal arena in which the gladiators practiced, circumscribed by steps of a small cavea, probably reserved for a limited number of spectators.

The size of the arena was relatively average (though slightly smaller than the Colosseum's) sitting at roughly 63 m long x 42 m wide. The cavea surrounding the arena has been calculated to encompass nine gradus, with a support system of concrete vaults over brick-faced concrete walls. In order to reach the cavea one would access a small staircase. Then there were ceremonial entrances located along the long entrance with smaller boxes located on the small axis. There were also underground chambers which were likely used for storage purposes. The foundation of the cavea was also elevated 2.75 m above the arena with a rectangular portico surrounding it with columns in two storeys, the lower in unfluted travertine Tuscan style and presumably Ionic above with no surviving capitals to confirm and the Ionic column features themselves belonging to a later repair than original construction. Throughout the sides of the portico were openings to various small rectangular chambers which would have served as living quarters for the gladiators, as well as stairs leading up to the second storey. We also have evidence of a second row of small spaces located behind the rectangular chambers along the north and south sides with access outwards to the street that were likely used as shops in antiquity.

In the northwest corner of the portico, one of the four small, triangular fountains has been restored. It lies in the spaces between the curved wall of the cavea and the colonnade. A cement block remained between two brick walls, converging at an acute angle.

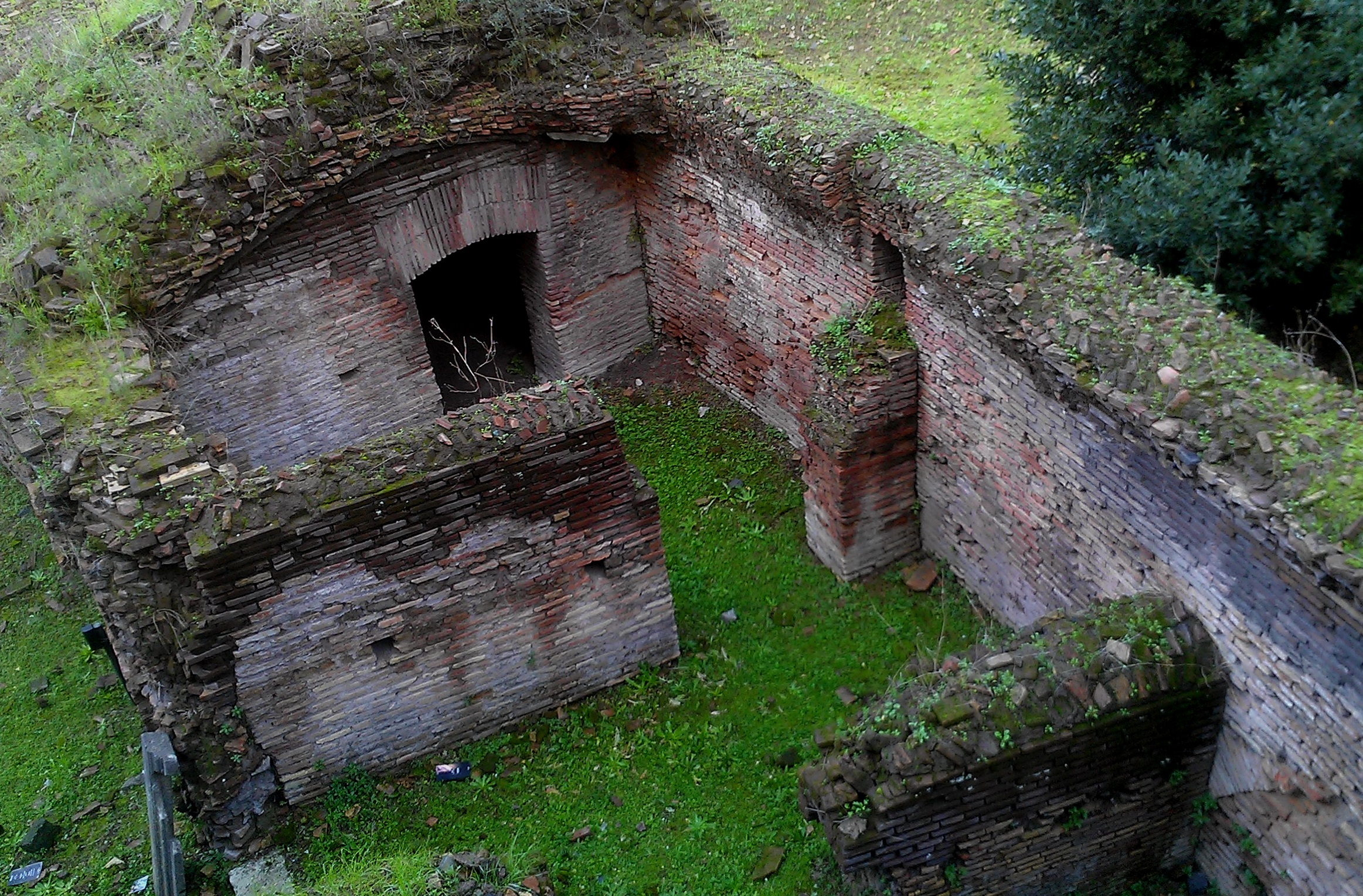
South-eastern corner

A large part of the brickwork structures were also originally covered by marble slabs that were later removed.

While there is a lack of remains for the upper storeys, it has been assumed that the second storey replicated the plan of the first in general layout and usage, while the third storey likely had an open gallery in light of the portico. It has also been postulated that there was a large axial hall encompassed on all three sides by colonnades with five entrances serving as a sacrarium or armamentarium.

As noted in textual sources and still undergoing inconclusive excavations carried out in relation to the Colosseum, there was an underground passage that connected the gladiatorial school with the Flavian amphitheatre. This corridor was likely paralleled above the ground as well, though, it remains speculation.

== Evidence ==
=== Textual ===
Some of the ancient sources which survive to today are Epictetus, who describes some of the harsh conditions the gladiators of a ludus often faced. Roman poet Juvenal also enlightens about the separate quarters present in a ludus. Roman orator Quintilian further describes the exchange of blows of gladiators in practice.

=== Archaeological ===
The archaeological remains of the Ludus Magnus represent roughly less than half of the practice arena and barracks, while the rest of the structure remains hidden under street level and other buildings. What remains is largely the product of a rebuilding endeavor taken on by the emperor Trajan in the early second century AD According to Claridge, under Trajan the seating area and ground level were elevated while the arena level remained intact. We also know of half of the plan from a fragment that has survived from the Severan Marble Plan (early third century AD), although breakage and erosion have decreased its informative value. There were also great doubts about where it was located in the general topography of ancient Rome, so that it can now be related to a building in Piazza Iside, still visible.

== See also ==
- Ludus Dacicus
- Amphitheatre
- Circus Maximus
- Colosseum
- Forma Urbis Romae
- List of Roman amphitheatres

== Notes ==
Preceded by Colosseum	Landmarks of Rome; Ludus Magnus	Succeeded by Gardens of Maecenas
