= Forma Urbis Romae =

Marble map of ancient Rome (c.205-208)

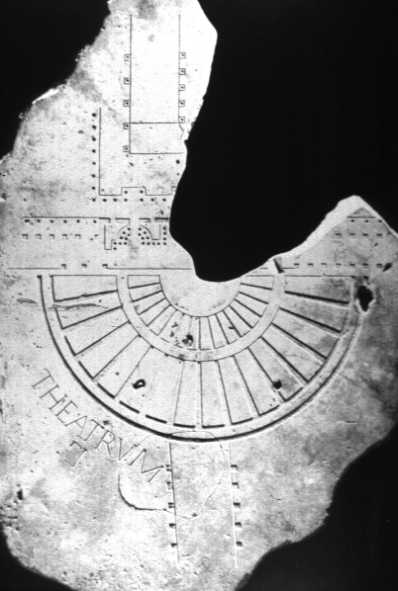
Reconstruction of part of the Forma Urbis with cavea of theatrum Pompei shown.

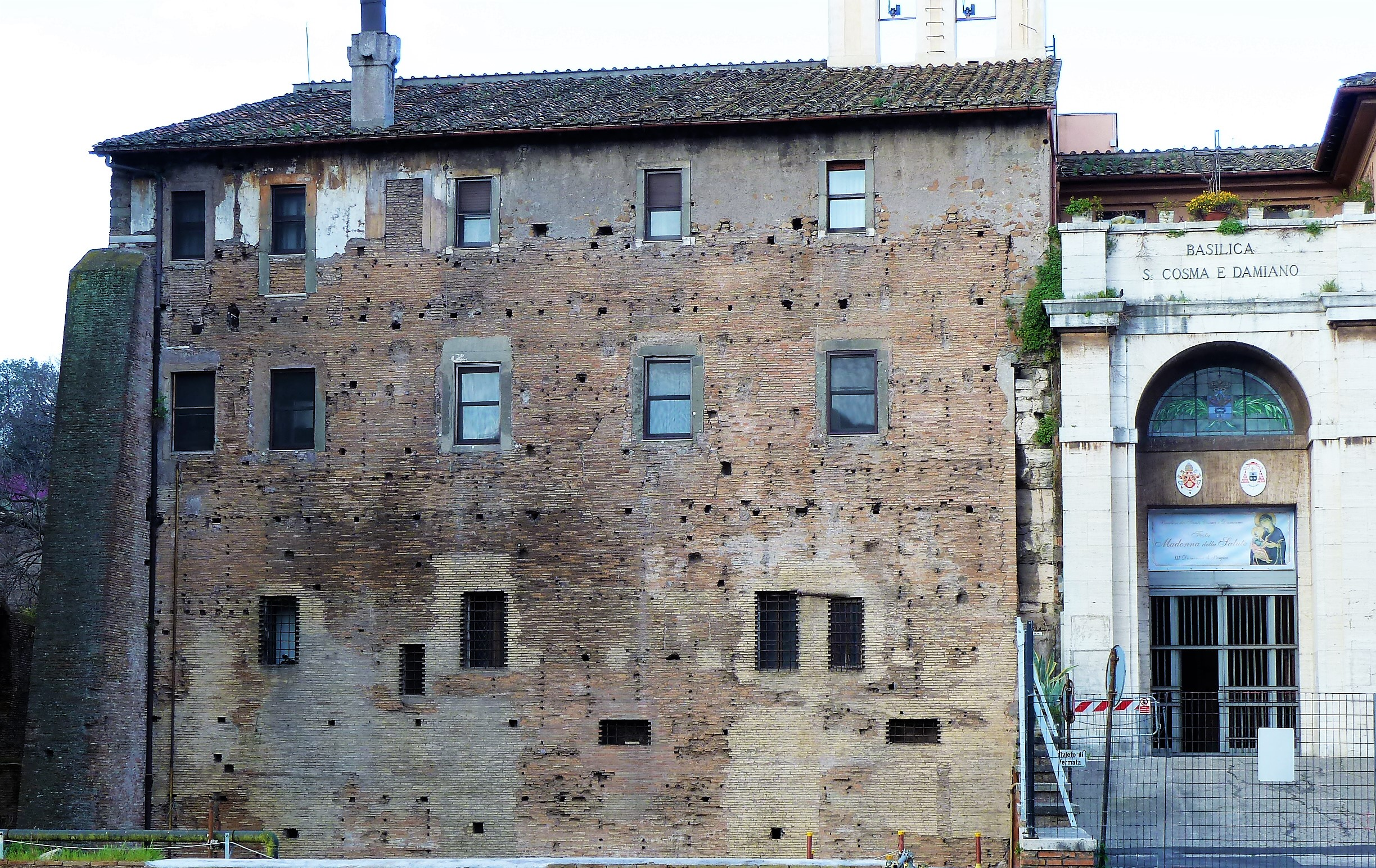
The wall where the map was originally mounted

The Forma Urbis Romae or Severan Marble Plan is a massive marble map of ancient Rome, created under the emperor Septimius Severus between AD 203 and 211. Matteo Cadario gives specific years of 205–208, noting that the map was based on property records.

== Description ==
It originally measured 18 m (60 ft) wide by 13 m (45 ft) high and was carved into 150 Proconnesian marble slabs mounted on an interior wall of the Temple of Peace.

Created at a scale of approximately 1 to 240 (Cadario states 1:260 to 1:270), the map was detailed enough to show the floor plans of nearly every temple, bath, and insula in the central Roman city.

The map was oriented with south at the top. On the map are names and plans of public buildings, streets, and private homes. The creators used signs and details like columns and staircases.

The Plan was gradually destroyed during the Middle Ages, with the marble stones being used as building materials or for making lime. In 1562, the young antiquarian sculptor Giovanni Antonio Dosio excavated fragments of the Forma Urbis from a site near the Church of SS. Cosma e Damiano, under the direction of the humanist condottiere Torquato Conti, who had purchased excavation rights from the canons of the church. Conti made a gift of the recovered fragments to Cardinal Alessandro Farnese, who entrusted them to his librarian Onofrio Panvinio and his antiquarian Fulvio Orsini. Little interest seems to have been elicited by the marble shards.

In all, about 10% of the original surface area of the plan has since been recovered in the form of over 1,000 marble fragments.

Part of the excavated plan showed a portion of the Forum of Augustus, interpreted as "a working drawing or as a proof of the existence of a more ancient Forma Urbis."

== Projects ==
Piecing together the surviving fragments of the plan is an activity that has engrossed scholars for centuries. Renaissance scholars managed to match and identify around 250 of the pieces, usually by recognizing famous landmarks such as the Colosseum and the Circus Maximus. In the second half of the 20th century, thanks to the works and publications of Guglielmo Gatti, Lucos Cozza, and Emilio Rodríguez Almeida, several fragments of the plan have been identified and located. Other scholars (e.g., Claudia Cecamore, Filippo Coarelli, Daniele Manacorda, Domenico Palombi, Luigi Pedroni, and others) have re-interpreted the topography depicted on many fragments. A research project at Stanford University in 2002 had some success in positioning four fragments and in reassembling nine fragments with pattern recognition algorithms. Using archaeological and literary sources, since 1996 Pier Luigi Tucci (Johns Hopkins University) has positioned twenty-four fragments in five Augustan regions and has offered new interpretations of the area of the AQVEDVCTIVM on the Caelian hill, of the Republican building in opus incertum at Testaccio (with Lucos Cozza), and of the area of the Circus Flaminius (in particular, the ship of Aeneas and the earlier marble plan from the Via Anicia).

A new piece of Forma Urbis Romae that completes the words "Circus Flaminius" was uncovered in 2014 at the Palazzo Maffei Marescotti, a building owned by the Vatican.

In 2024, fragments of the Forma Urbis went on display under a glass floor at the new Museum of the Forma Urbis near the Colosseum. It is part of a larger project of the Archaeological Park of the Celio to develop the area around the Roman Forum, Palatine Hill, and Colosseum.

== See also ==
- Topography of ancient Rome – Multidisciplinary field of study
- Porticus Vipsania

== Sources ==
- Henri Jordan Forma Urbis Romae. Regionum XIIII (Berlin, 1874)
- Carettoni, Gianfilippo; Colini, Antonio; Cozza, Lucos; and Gatti, Guglielmo, eds. La pianta marmorea di Roma antica. Forma urbis Romae (Rome, 1960)
- Rodríguez Almeida, Emilio. "Aggiornamento topografico dei colli Oppio, Cispio e Viminale secondo la Forma Urbis marmorea". Rendiconti della Pontificia Accademia romana di Archeologia Vol XLVIII. Anni Accademici 1975–1976,: pp. 263–278 (Roma, 1976).
- Rodríguez Almeida, Emilio. "Forma Urbis marmorea. Nuovi elementi di analisi e nuove ipotesi di lavoro", in Mélanges de l'École française de Rome 89/1: pp. 219–256 (Roma, 1977).
- Rodríguez Almeida, Emilio. "Miscellanea sulla «Forma Urbis» marmorea"; + Rodríguez Almeida, E. "Il Campo Marzio settentrionale: «Solarium» e «Pomerium»"; in Rendiconti Accademia Romana di Archeologia – III serie Vol. LI-LII. Anni Accademici 1978–1979 e 1979–1980, (Roma, 1980).
- Rodríguez Almeida, Emilio. "Forma Urbis Marmorea. Aggiornamento Generale" 1980, 2 vol., (Roma 1981).
- Rodríguez Almeida, Emilio. "Un nuovo frammento della Forma Urbis Marmorea". Analecta Romana Istituti Danici, Suppl. 10: pp. 87–92 (Roma, 1983).
- Rodríguez Almeida, Emilio. "Un frammento di una nuova pianta marmorea di Roma". Journal of Roman Archaeology (1): pp. 120–131 (Portsmouth, 1988).
- Rodríguez Almeida, Emilio. "Novità minori dalla Forma Urbis marmorea". Ostraka 1 (1): pp. 55–80, (Roma, 1992).
- Rodríguez Almeida, Emilio. "Diversi problemi connessi con la lastra n. 37 della Forma Urbis Marmorea e con la topografia in Circo e in Campo", in Rendiconti Accademia Romana di Archeologia, in III serie Vol. LXIV. Anno Accademico 1991–1992 (Roma, 1992).
- Rodríguez Almeida, Emilio. "Euristica materiale e forma marmorea: alcuni falsi problemi" + Rodríguez Almeida, E. "Aemiliana", in Rendiconti Accademia Romana di Archeologia, III serie Vol. LXVIII. Anno Accademico 1995–1996, (Roma, 1996).
- Rodríguez Almeida, Emilio. "Forma urbis antiquae, Le mappe marmoree di Roma tra la repubblica e Settimio Severo". Collection de l'École française de Rome 305/2002, (Roma, 2002).
- Meneghini, Roberto; Santangeli Valenzani, Riccardo (eds), Formae Urbis Romae. Nuovi frammenti di piante marmoree dallo scavo dei Fori Imperiali (Bullettino della Commissione Archeologica Comunale di Roma, Suppl. 15) (Rome, 2006) 99–101 (bibliography on the Forma Urbis between 1960 and 2006)
- Tucci, Pier Luigi, ‘New fragments of ancient plans of Rome’, Journal of Roman Archaeology 20 (2007) 469-80 (a review of Meneghini – Santangeli Valenzani 2006)
- Tucci, Pier Luigi, ‘Dov’erano il tempio di Nettuno e la nave di Enea?’, Bullettino della Commissione Archeologica Comunale di Roma 98 (1997) 15–42;
- Tucci, Pier Luigi, ‘Ideology and technology in Rome’s water supply: castella, the toponym AQVEDVCTIVM, and supply to the Palatine and Caelian hill’, Journal of Roman Archaeology 19 (2006) 94–120;
- Tucci, Pier Luigi (with Lucos Cozza), ‘Navalia’, Archeologia Classica 57 (2006) 175–202;
- Tucci, Pier Luigi, ‘Imagining the temple of Castor and Pollux in circo Flaminio’, in A. Leone, D. Palombi, S. Walker (eds), Res Bene Gestae. Ricerche di storia urbana su Roma antica in onore di Eva Margareta Steinby (Rome 2007) 411–425;
- Tucci, Pier Luigi,‘La controversa storia della Porticus Aemilia’, in Archeologia Classica 63 (2012) 575–591;
- Tucci, Pier Luigi,‘The Pons Sublicius: a reinvestigation’, in Memoirs of the American Academy in Rome 56–57 (2011–2012) 177–212. Tucci's visual analysis of the Forma Urbis, as well as his research on the role of this marble plan in the Templum Pacis, will be published in 2014 (personal communication).
