= Giuseppe Lugli =

Italian topographer (1890–1967)

- Born: July 18, 1890; Rome, Italy
- Died: December 5, 1967; Rome, Italy
- Education: Università di Roma "La Sapienza"
- Occupations: Classical archaeologist and Roman topographer

Giuseppe Aurelio Lugli (born in Rome, Italy, July 18, 1890; died in Rome, Italy, on December 5, 1967) was Professor of ancient Roman topography at the University of Rome from 1933 to 1961.

Lugli's academic career began with the completion of his master "Laurea" degree at Università di Roma La Sapienza in 1913, where he wrote a thesis on the villa of the emperor Domitian at Castel Gandolfo.

Lugli's career was prolific, although among his many significant contributions, several are paramount. He is credited with more than 230 scholarly publications. In his topographical career, Lugli compiled the landmark Fontes ad topographiam veteris urbis Romae pertinentes (8 vols. 1952-69). The aim of this corpus was to collect all of the textual mentions in the ancient sources that pertain to the topography and monuments of Rome. The work is organized according to the Augustan regions of the city.

Lugli was also a student of architecture, and in particular of building techniques. His study La tecnica edilizia romana: con particolare riguardo a Roma e Lazio, Roma (Bardi, 1957) remains a seminal study of the technology of construction in Italy during the 1st millennium B.C.

Lugli also founded the Forma Italiae, a series of archaeological maps and concordance for Italy. This work continues today as a serial publication, and associated research project, directed by Prof. Paolo Sommella in the Department of Ancient History, Archaeology and Anthropology at the Università degli Studi di Roma "La Sapienza". The aim of Forma Italiae is to map the full archaeological landscape of Italy at a sufficient scale to facilitate a variety of research and teaching needs.

Lugli was a member of the Accademia dei Lincei from 1946 until his death.

== Necrology ==
- Romanelli, P., "Giuseppe Lugli", StRom 16 (1968), 57–9.
- A. M. Colini "Ricordo di Giuseppe Lugli" RIASA, n.s., XV, 1968.

== Scholarship ==
- 1930-1940. I monumenti antichi di Roma e suburbio. [I. La zona archeologica.--II. Le grandi opere pubblicha.--III. A traverso le regioni.] 3 vol., plus Supplemento: un decennio di scoperte archeologiche. Rome: G. Bardi. Worldcat.
- 1940. Pianta di Roma antica: forma Urbis imperatorum temporibus (1:10.000). Worldcat.
- 1946. Roma antica: il centro monumentale. Rome: G. Bardi. Worldcat.
- 1948. La Velia e Roma aeterna. Elementi topografici e luoghi di culto. Worldcat.
- 1952-1969. Fontes ad topographiam veteris urbis Romae pertinentes. Colligendos at que edendos curavit Iosephus Lugli. Rome. Worldcat.
- 1957. La tecnica edilizia romana con particolare riguardo a Roma e Lazio. 2 v. Rome: Bardi. Worldcat.
- 1969. La Domus Aurea e le Terme di Traiano. Rome: G. Bardi. Worldcat.
- 1971. Il Foro Romano e il Palatino. Worldcat.

== Works ==
- La via Appia attraverso l'Apulia e un singolare gruppo di strade "orientate" (PDF) (in Italian).
