= George Young =

George Young may refer to:

== Arts and entertainment ==
- George Young (filmmaker), Australian stage manager and film director in the silent era
- George Young (rock musician) (1946–2017), Australian musician, songwriter, and record producer
- George Young (actor) (born 1980), British actor
- George Young (saxophonist) (born 1937), American musician, member of Manhattan Jazz Quintet

== Law and politics ==
- George Young (diplomat), (died c. 1615), Scottish diplomat and administrator
- George Renny Young (1802–1853), Scottish-born journalist, lawyer, author and political figure in Nova Scotia
- George Young, Lord Young (1819–1907), Scottish politician and judge
- George Frederick Young (1791–1870), English shipbuilder and politician
- George Kennedy Young (1911–1990), British intelligence officer and right-wing politician
- George Young, Baron Young of Cookham (born 1941), British Conservative Party politician
- George B. Young (1840–1906), American lawyer and judge
- George C. Young (1916–2015), American lawyer and judge
- George E. Young, American clergyman and member of the Oklahoma House of Representatives
- George U. Young (1867–1926), American businessman and politician in Arizona
- George M. Young (1870–1932), U.S. congressman from North Dakota
- George Young (Australian politician) (1823–1869), businessman and politician in the colony of South Australia
- George Young (Victorian politician) (1848–1891), politician in the colony of Victoria, Australia
- Sir George Young, 4th Baronet (1872–1952), English diplomat, author and Cambridge Union Society president
- Sir George Young, 5th Baronet (1908–1960), British diplomat
- George A. Young (mayor), former mayor of Cumberland, Maryland

== Medicine ==
- George Young (surgeon, born 1692) (1692–1757), Edinburgh surgeon, physician, philosopher and empiric
- George Young (surgeon and botanist) (died 1803), British military surgeon and botanist

== Religion ==
- George Young (Presbyterian minister) (1777–1848), Scottish Presbyterian minister
- George Young (Methodist minister) (1821–1910), Canadian Methodist minister
- George Young (priest) (1852–1937), Dean of Adelaide, 1906–1933
- George D. Young III (born 1955), American bishop

== Sports ==
- George Young (cricketer) (1847–1935), New Zealand cricketer
- George Young (baseball) (1890–1950), American professional baseball player
- George Young (swimmer) (1909–1972), Canadian marathon swimmer
- George Young (Scottish footballer) (1922–1997), footballer with Rangers and Scotland
- George Young (Welsh footballer) (born 1950), footballer with Newport County
- George Young (American football executive) (1930–2001)
- George Young (runner) (1937–2022), American track and field athlete, Olympic medalist
- George Young (British athlete) (1885–1952), British Olympic athlete
- George Young (Australian rules footballer) (born 1949), Australian rules player and cricketer in the 1970s
- George Young (American football player) (1924–1969), American football defensive end
- George Young (rugby union) (born 2001), Welsh rugby union player
- George Avery Young (1866–1900), British cricketer and Wales international rugby player
- George Ashworth Young (1878–1920), Australian rules footballer

== Others ==
- George Young (Royal Navy officer) (1732–1810), British Royal Navy admiral
- Sir George Young, 2nd Baronet (1797–1848), British Royal Navy officer
- George Albert Young (1878–1947), Canadian geologist
- George Paxton Young (1818–1889), Canadian philosopher and professor
- G. M. Young (George Malcolm Young, 1882–1959), English historian
- George Young (architect) (1858–1933), Scottish architect
- George Young (Neighbours), fictional character in the Australian soap opera Neighbours

== See also ==
- George Jung (1942–2021), American cocaine smuggler
