= George Young, Baron Young of Cookham =

British politician (born 1941)

The Right Honourable The Lord Young of Cookham CH PC
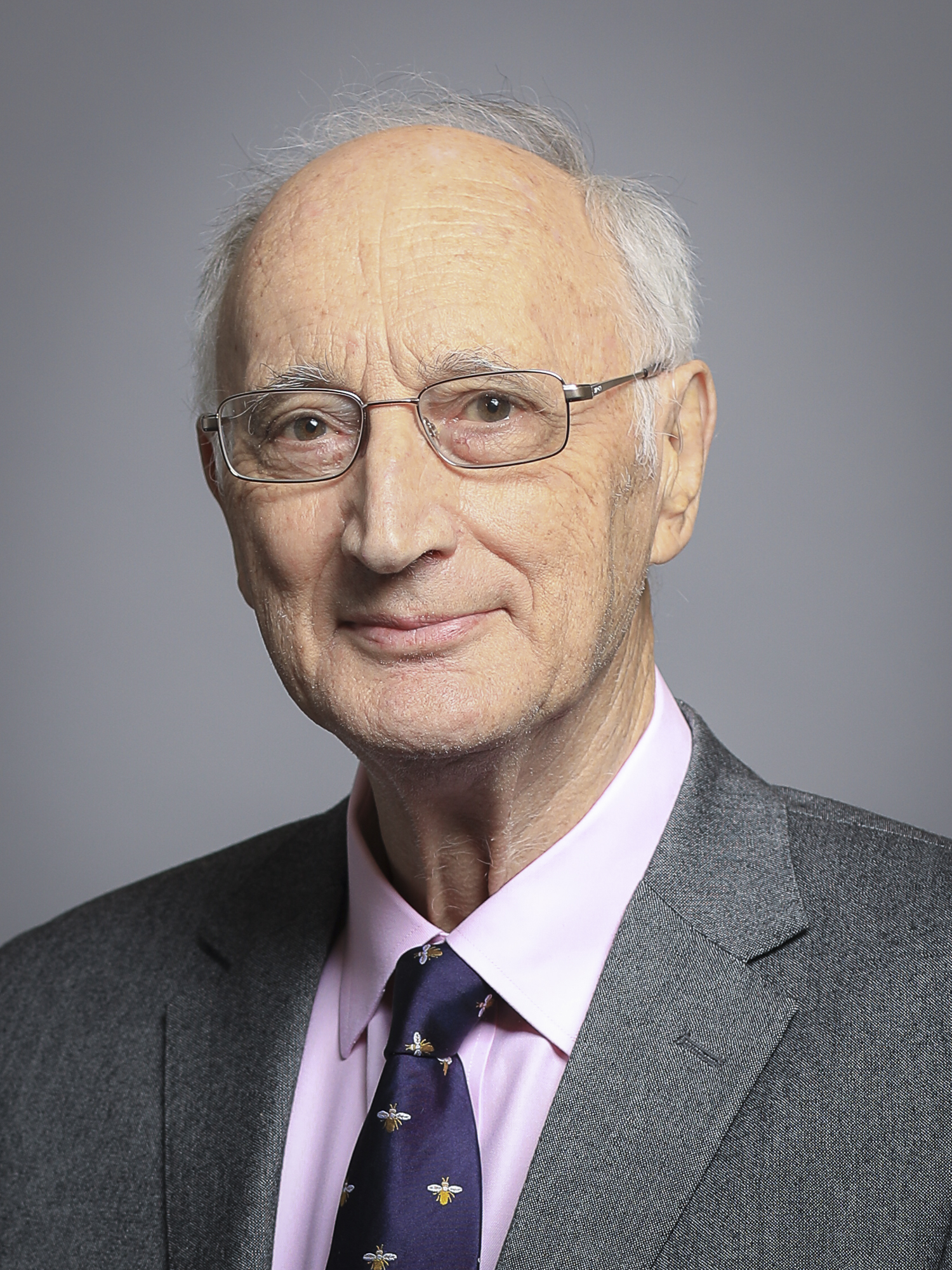
- Official portrait, 2020

Lord-in-waiting Government Whip
- In office 25 July 2016 – 29 August 2019
- Prime Minister: Theresa May; Boris Johnson
- Preceded by: The Earl of Courtown
- Succeeded by: The Baroness Sater

Government Chief Whip in the House of Commons Parliamentary Secretary to the Treasury
- In office 19 October 2012 – 14 July 2014
- Prime Minister: David Cameron
- Preceded by: Andrew Mitchell
- Succeeded by: Michael Gove

Leader of the House of Commons Lord Keeper of the Privy Seal
- In office 12 May 2010 – 4 September 2012
- Prime Minister: David Cameron
- Preceded by: Harriet Harman
- Succeeded by: Andrew Lansley

Chairman of the Standards and Privileges Committee
- In office 18 July 2001 – 8 September 2009
- Preceded by: Robert Sheldon
- Succeeded by: David Curry
Ministerial offices
Secretary of State for Transport
In office 5 July 1995 – 2 May 1997
| Prime Minister | John Major |
| Preceded by | Brian Mawhinney |
| Succeeded by | John Prescott |
Financial Secretary to the Treasury
In office 11 July 1994 – 5 July 1995
| Prime Minister | John Major |
| Preceded by | Stephen Dorrell |
| Succeeded by | Michael Jack |
Minister of State for Housing
In office 28 November 1990 – 11 July 1994
| Prime Minister | John Major |
| Preceded by | Michael Spicer |
| Succeeded by | The Viscount Ullswater |
Comptroller of the Household
In office 14 July 1990 – 28 November 1990
| Prime Minister | Margaret Thatcher |
| Preceded by | Alastair Goodlad |
| Succeeded by | David Lightbown |
Parliamentary Under-Secretary of State for the Environment
In office 15 September 1981 – 10 September 1986
| Prime Minister | Margaret Thatcher |
| Preceded by | Geoffrey Finsberg |
| Succeeded by | Christopher Chope |
Parliamentary Under-Secretary of State for Health and Social Security
In office 7 May 1979 – 15 September 1981
| Prime Minister | Margaret Thatcher |
| Preceded by | Eric Deakins |
| Succeeded by | Geoffrey Finsberg |
Shadow Cabinet offices
Shadow Leader of the House of Commons
In office 8 September 2009 – 11 May 2010
| Leader | David Cameron |
| Preceded by | Alan Duncan |
| Succeeded by | Rosie Winterton |
In office 1 June 1998 – 26 September 2000
| Leader | William Hague |
| Preceded by | Gillian Shephard |
| Succeeded by | Angela Browning |
Shadow Chancellor of the Duchy of Lancaster
In office 1 June 1998 – 26 September 2000
| Leader | William Hague |
| Preceded by | Gillian Shephard |
| Succeeded by | Angela Browning |
Shadow Secretary of State for Defence
In office 11 June 1997 – 1 June 1998
| Leader | William Hague |
| Preceded by | John Major |
| Succeeded by | John Maples |
Shadow Secretary of State for Transport
In office 2 May 1997 – 9 June 1997
| Leader | John Major |
| Preceded by | Andrew Smith |
| Succeeded by | Norman Fowler |

Member of the House of Lords
- Lord Temporal
- Life peerage 29 September 2015

Member of Parliament
- In office 28 February 1974 – 30 March 2015
- Preceded by: Nigel Spearing
- Succeeded by: Kit Malthouse
- Constituency: Acton (1974–1983); Ealing Acton (1983–1997); North West Hampshire (1997–2015)

Personal details
- Born: 16 July 1941 (age 85) Oxford, England
- Party: Conservative
- Spouse: Aurelia Nemon-Stuart (m. 1964)
- Children: 4
- Education: Christ Church, Oxford; University of Surrey

George Samuel Knatchbull Young, Baron Young of Cookham, CH, PC (born 16 July 1941), known as Sir George Young, 6th Baronet from 1960 to 2015, is a British Conservative Party politician who served as a Member of Parliament (MP) from 1974 to 2015, having represented Ealing Acton from 1974 to 1997 and North West Hampshire from 1997. He has served in Cabinet on three occasions: as Secretary of State for Transport from 1995 to 1997; as the Leader of the House of Commons and Lord Privy Seal from 2010 to 2012; and as Conservative Chief Whip from 2012 to 2014.

He stood down from the Commons at the 2015 election and was created a life peer, as Baron Young of Cookham, of Cookham in the Royal County of Berkshire, on 29 September 2015. He sits on the Conservative benches in the House of Lords, where he served as a junior whip from July 2016 to August 2019. Young resigned from this position on 29 August in protest at Prime Minister Boris Johnson's decision to prorogue parliament. He served as a minister under five Conservative prime ministers (Margaret Thatcher, John Major, David Cameron, Theresa May and Boris Johnson).

== Early life ==
Young was born on 16 July 1941 in Oxford into a prominent English family, the elder son of Sir George Peregrine "Gerry" Young, 5th Baronet CMG and Elisabeth Knatchbull-Hugessen. His paternal ancestors and cousins include Admiral Sir George Young, an admiral in the Royal Navy and father of the first Baronet; civil servant Sir William Mackworth Young; colonial governors Sir Hubert Winthrop Young and Sir Mark Aitchison Young; mountaineer Geoffrey Winthrop Young, and Hilton Young, 1st Baron Kennet. Sir Brian Young (1922–2017), director-general of the Independent Television Authority, was his cousin.

Young's father was a diplomat who met Elisabeth while serving in Beijing (where her father, Sir Hughe Knatchbull-Hugessen, was British Ambassador). He had saved his future wife's life during an aerial shooting attack in 1937. Upon his father's death in 1960, George succeeded to the baronetcy created in 1813. Young is a great-great-grandson of Frederick Lygon, 6th Earl Beauchamp.

== Education and early career ==
Young was educated at St. Aubyns Preparatory School in Rottingdean, Eton College, and Christ Church, Oxford, where he read Philosophy, Politics and Economics, graduating in 1963 (and later proceeding to MA). He was active in student politics while at Oxford, holding various offices in the Oxford University Conservative Association and being elected to the Standing Committee of the Oxford Union.

After graduating, he worked for a while at the merchant bank Hill Samuel, and then at the National Economic Development Office from 1966 to 1967. He then spent two years as Kobler Research Fellow at the University of Surrey, where he completed an MPhil. From 1969 to 1974, Young was an economic advisor to the Post Office Corporation.

== Career in local politics ==
Young was elected as a councillor in the London Borough of Lambeth from 1968 to 1971 together with his wife and also the future British Prime Minister John Major. He represented the ward of Clapham Town, and served on the Housing Committee. He and other Lambeth councillors worked as refuse collectors at weekends during a strike. Young lost his seat on Lambeth Council in 1971.

In 1970, Young was elected to the Greater London Council (GLC) as one of four members for the Ealing. He served on the GLC from 1970 to 1973, where he was vice-chairman of the Strategic Planning Authority. He did not seek re-election to the GLC in 1973, having been selected as the Conservative candidate for the Acton constituency. He was later one of the local government ministers who abolished the GLC in 1986.

== Parliamentary career ==
=== Member of Parliament ===
Young was elected to parliament at the February 1974 general election as MP for Acton with a majority of 1,300, defeating the sitting Labour Party MP, Nigel Spearing (who was returned to Parliament a few weeks later after winning a by-election in Newham South). Young was re-elected as MP for Acton at the October 1974 general election with a majority of 808. He continued to represent Acton (renamed Ealing Acton in 1983) for the next 23 years, until the seat was abolished in boundary changes. He was selected for the safe Conservative seat of North West Hampshire prior to the 1997 general election to replace the retiring MP Sir David Mitchell (the father of Andrew Mitchell whom Young would, in 2012, succeed as Chief Whip). Young was elected with a majority of 11,551, and served as the MP for North West Hampshire until his retirement in 2015.

==== Posts ====
From 1976 to 1979 Young served as an opposition whip. When the Conservative Party won the 1979 general election, he was appointed Parliamentary under-secretary of state at the Department of Health and Social Security. From 1981 to 1986, Young served as the Parliamentary Under-Secretary of State at the Department for the Environment.

On the backbenches from 1986 to 1990, Young was among the leaders of the rebellion within the Conservative Party against the implementation of the poll tax. Shortly before leaving office in 1990, Prime Minister Margaret Thatcher brought Young back into government as a whip (Comptroller of the Household) as part of her attempts to reunite the party.

When John Major became prime minister in November 1990, he gave Young the role of Minister for Housing and Planning. Shortly after, during an interview for BBC Radio 4's Today programme in June 1991, Young described the homeless as "the people you step over when you come out of the opera". In 1992 when asked during parliamentary discussions of the Armley Asbestos Disaster for financial assistance in surveying local housing in the Armley area for residual asbestos, Young responded that the government would not provide financial assistance to the home owners or the council to pay for decontamination as this "would not be a justifiable use of public funds".

Young then served as Financial Secretary to the Treasury from 1994 to 1995, and in Cabinet as Secretary of State for Transport from 1995 to 1997. He was appointed a privy counsellor in 1993. Following the Conservative Party's defeat in 1997, Young was appointed Shadow Defence Secretary by the new party leader, William Hague. In 1998, Young became Shadow Leader of the House of Commons. In 1999, he was given additional responsibilities as Spokesman for Constitutional Affairs. He was a member of the Modernisation Select Committee and of the House of Commons Commission from 1998 to 2000.

Young resigned from the Shadow cabinet in September 2000 in order to stand for election as Speaker of the House of Commons. Fourteen MPs put their names forward to succeed the retiring Betty Boothroyd, and many observers considered Young to be the favourite. He had support from both the Conservative and Labour leadership; however, many backbench MPs, particularly those from the Labour Party (who held a large majority in the House at the time), viewed Young as someone who had too recently been a member of his party's front bench team and was thus not sufficiently in touch with ordinary MPs. In the end, Young was not elected as Speaker, the members of the House choosing instead Labour MP Michael Martin.

From 2000 to 2009, Young remained on the backbenches. He was elected chairman of the House of Commons Committee on Standards and Privileges in 2001, and was re-elected to that role in 2005.

Young stood again for the position of Speaker of the House of Commons in 2009, finishing second in the ballot of MPs to fellow Conservative MP John Bercow. In the first ever secret ballot of MPs to choose the new Speaker, Bercow defeated Young in the final round of voting by a margin of 322 to 271.

On 8 September 2009, Conservative party leader David Cameron appointed Young to the front bench again, taking up his former role of Shadow Leader of the House of Commons, replacing Alan Duncan who had held the post since January 2009. He became Leader of the House of Commons and Lord Privy Seal on 12 May 2010 after the Conservative Party formed a coalition government with the Liberal Democrats following the 2010 general election. In this role, he attended Cabinet meetings, but not as a full member.

Young left government in the reshuffle of September 2012, and David Cameron recommended his appointment as a Member of the Order of the Companions of Honour. However, his return to the backbenches was short-lived, as following Andrew Mitchell's resignation as Chief Whip the following month, Cameron chose Young to replace him.

Young is Patron of the Tory Reform Group and the All-Party Parliamentary Group on Cycling.

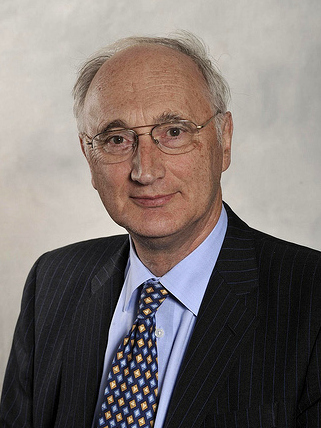
Official portrait, 2010

In October 2012 it was reported that Young supported a new group of Conservative MPs established to reconnect the Tories with working class voters. The Blue Collar Conservatism group aims to develop policies to attract "aspirational" voters on average incomes whose support is "vital" to winning a Commons majority.

On 29 November 2013 Young announced he would stand down as an MP at the 2015 general election. He again retired from the cabinet at the 2014 reshuffle, replaced as Chief Whip by Michael Gove. Gove described Young as 'distinguished' and 'honourable'.

==== Tower block housing ====
Young was a vocal critic of tower block housing, saying in 1974: "Nearly all local authorities have now stopped building this type of accommodation, as it is generally recognized they provide an inadequate environment for those who have to live in them. But it is no consolation to the many thousands who will have to live on these estates for the foreseeable future to know that the mistake will not recur." One measure proposed by Young was to make grants and subsidies available to minimize "some of the disadvantages of living on estates containing tower blocks." He described tower block housing as "an economic and social disaster" and said he would "like an assurance that loan sanction would not be given for any more."

==== Domestic violence ====
In February 1975 Young was appointed to the newly formed select committee on Violence in the Family. The committee's terms of reference were "To consider the extent, nature and causes of the problems of families where there is violence between the partners or where children suffer non-accidental injury: and to make recommendations." The committee issued an interim report in September 1975 and was instrumental in setting up several government research reports into domestic violence. In 1976 he sponsored the Sexual Offences (Amendment) Bill which allowed victims of rape to remain anonymous.

==== Cycling ====
In 1982 Young and his children appeared on a British Rail poster alongside Jimmy Savile to promote new measures to allow people to take their bicycles on trains more easily. Young had made a critical speech in Parliament about the provisions for cyclists to take their bikes on trains, and when British Rail implemented new measures they invited Young to appear on the publicity poster. An ever-enthusiastic cyclist, the British media nicknamed Young the "Bicycling Baronet".

=== House of Lords ===
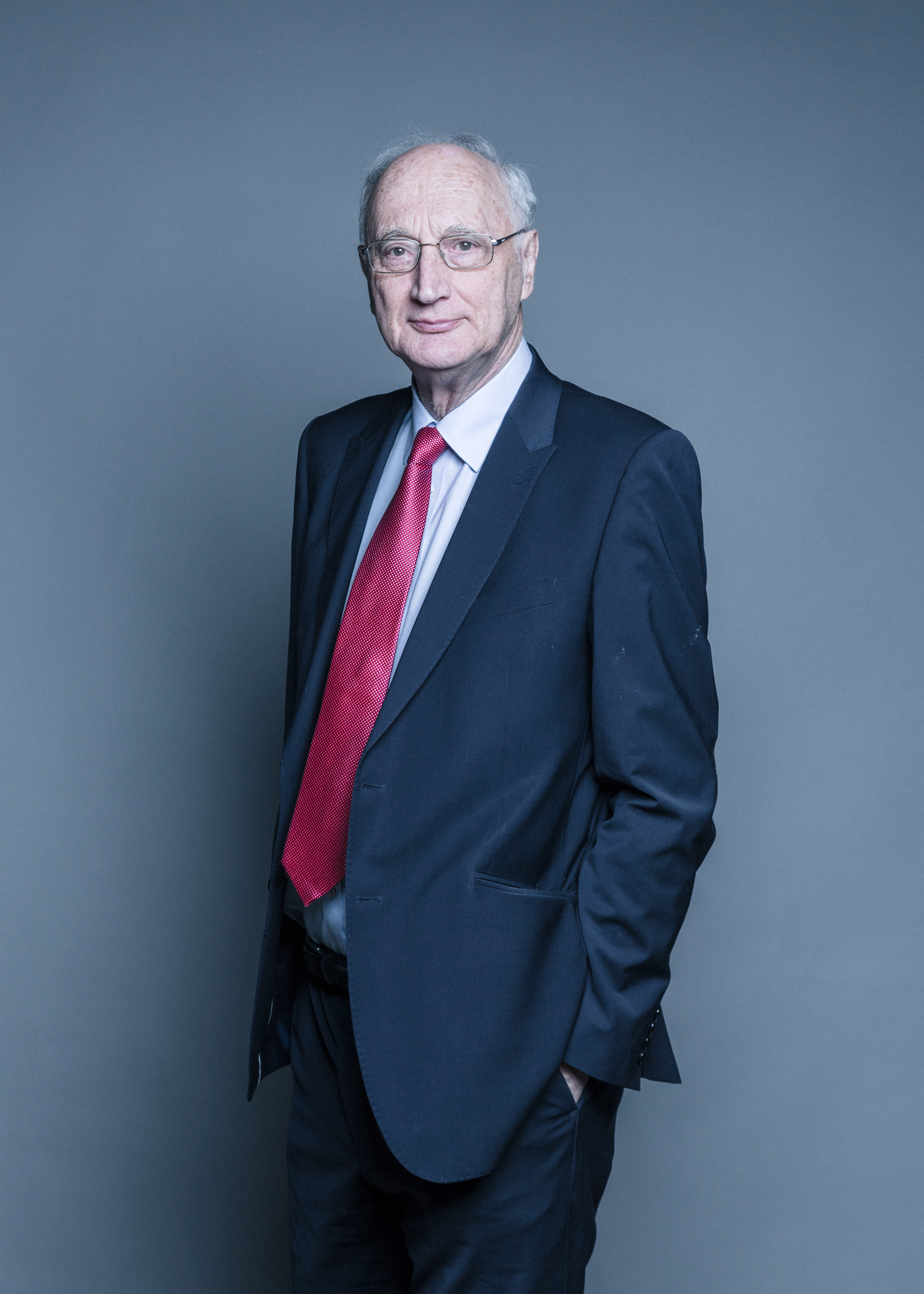
Official portrait, 2018

Young was created a life peer as Baron Young of Cookham, of Cookham in the County of Berkshire, on 29 September 2015. He sits on the Conservative benches of the House of Lords.

In July 2016, he was appointed as Lord in Waiting (i.e. government whip). In September 2016, he was named to serve as Treasury spokesman in the House of Lords. On 29 August 2019, Young resigned as a whip in the House of Lords in protest at Prime Minister Boris Johnson's decision to suspend parliament.

== Personal and family life ==
Young succeeded as 6th baronet in 1960 and married Aurelia Nemon-Stuart, daughter of the sculptor Oscar Nemon, at Oxford in 1964. They have four children: Sophia (b. 23 May 1965), George (b. 11 October 1966), Hugo Patrick (b. 23 September 1970) and Camilla (b. 1975). His elder son, the Hon. George "Gerry" Young, is heir apparent to the family baronetcy. The family grew up in Cookham, attending Holy Trinity Primary School in Cookham and Furze Platt secondary school in Maidenhead.

Lord Young supports the west London football club Queens Park Rangers (QPR) and has served as a churchwarden and a member of a diocesan synod in the Church of England.

== Titles, honours, styles and arms ==
=== Styles ===
- 1941–1960: Mr George Young
- 1960–1974: Sir George Young Bt
- 1974–1993: Sir George Young Bt MP
- 1993–2012: The Rt Hon Sir George Young Bt MP
- 2012–2015: The Rt Hon Sir George Young Bt CH MP
- 2015: The Rt Hon Sir George Young Bt CH
- 2015–present: The Rt Hon The Lord Young of Cookham CH PC (Note: Lord Young remains a baronet but by custom the postnom of Bt is dropped, since Peers of the Realm do not list subsidiary hereditary titles.)

=== Honours ===
- Baron
- Baronet
- Member of the Order of the Companions of Honour

=== Arms ===
Coat of arms of George Young, Baron Young of Cookham
| Crest A demi-unicorn couped ermine maned armed and hoofed or gorged with a naval crown azure supporting an anchor sable Helm That of a Baron Escutcheon Per fess sable and argent in chief two lions rampant guardant and in base an anchor with cable, all counterchanged Motto Be right and persist Other elements Member of the Order of the Companions of Honour insignia appended Symbolism The anchors and naval crown are in honour of Royal Navy officer Sir George Young, Admiral of the White Squadron, and his son, the first baronet, a commander in the Royal Navy. |

== Ancestry ==
Ancestors of George Young, Baron Young of Cookham

16. Sir George Young, 2nd Baronet
8. Sir George Young, 3rd Baronet
17. Susan Mackworth-Praed
4. Sir George Young, 4th Baronet
18. Evory Kennedy
9. Alice Eacy Kennedy
19. Alicia Hamilton
2. Sir George Young, 5th Baronet
20. Rev. Peregrine Ilbert
10. Sir Courtenay Ilbert
21. Rose Ann Owen
5. Jessie Helen Ilbert
22. Charles Bradley
11. Jessie Bradley
23. Anne Marian George
1. George Young, Baron Young of Cookham
24. Sir Edward Knatchbull, 9th Baronet
12. Rev. Reginald Knatchbull-Hugessen
25. Fanny Catherine Knight
6. Sir Hughe Knatchbull-Hugessen
26. Sir Alexander Montgomery, 3rd Baronet
13. Rachel Mary Montgomery
27. Caroline Rose Campbell
3. Elisabeth Knatchbull-Hugessen
28. Henry Perkins Wolrige
14. Sir Robert Gilmour, 1st Baronet
29. Anne Gordon, 18th of Hallhead and 7th of Esslemont
7. Mary Gilmour
30. Frederick Lygon, 6th Earl Beauchamp
15. Lady Susan Lygon
31. Lady Mary Stanhope

== See also ==
- Young baronets of Formosa Place
- Sustrans

Parliament of the United Kingdom
| Preceded by Nigel Spearing | Member of Parliament for Acton; 1974–1983 | Constituency abolished |
| New constituency | Member of Parliament for Ealing Acton; 1983–1997 | Constituency abolished |
| Preceded by David Mitchell | Member of Parliament for North West Hampshire; 1997–2015 | Succeeded by Kit Malthouse |
Political offices
| Preceded by Alastair Goodlad | Comptroller of the Household; 1990 | Succeeded by David Lightbown |
| Preceded by Stephen Dorrell | Financial Secretary to the Treasury; 1994–1995 | Succeeded by Michael Jack |
| Preceded by Brian Mawhinney | Secretary of State for Transport; 1995–1997 | Succeeded by John Prescott |
| Preceded by Andrew Smith | Shadow Secretary of State for Transport; 1997 | Succeeded by Norman Fowler |
| Preceded by David Clark | Shadow Secretary of State for Defence; 1997–1998 | Succeeded by John Maples |
| Preceded by Gillian Shephard | Shadow Leader of the House of Commons; 1998–2000 | Succeeded by Angela Browning |
| Preceded by Gillian Shephard | Shadow Chancellor of the Duchy of Lancaster; 1998–2000 | Succeeded by Angela Browning |
| Preceded by Alan Duncan | Shadow Leader of the House of Commons; 2009–2010 | Succeeded by Rosie Winterton |
| Preceded by Harriet Harman | Leader of the House of Commons; 2010–2012 | Succeeded by Andrew Lansley |
| Preceded by Harriet Harman | Lord Privy Seal; 2010–2012 | Succeeded by Andrew Lansley |
| Preceded by Andrew Mitchell | Government Chief Whip in the House of Commons; 2012–2014 | Succeeded by Michael Gove |
| Preceded by Andrew Mitchell | Parliamentary Secretary to the Treasury; 2012–2014 | Succeeded by Michael Gove |
Party political offices
| Preceded by Andrew Mitchell | Conservative Chief Whip in the House of Commons; 2012–2014 | Succeeded by Michael Gove |
Baronetage of the United Kingdom
| Preceded by Gerry Young | Baronet (of Formosa Place); 1960–present | Incumbent |
Orders of precedence in the United Kingdom
| Preceded by The Lord Hayward | Gentlemen; Baron Young of Cookham | Followed by The Lord Smith of Hindhead |
