= Young baronets of Formosa Place (1813) =

Escutcheon of the Young baronets of Formosa Place

The Young baronetcy, of Formosa Place in the County of Berkshire, was created in the Baronetage of the United Kingdom on 24 November 1813 for Samuel Young. He was the eldest son of Admiral Sir George Young. The second baronet was a captain in the Royal Navy. The third baronet was Chief Charity Commissioner. The fourth and fifth baronets were diplomats.

Several other members of the family achieved distinction. Sir Mackworth Young, third son of the second baronet, was Lieutenant-Governor of the Punjab; three of his sons became senior colonial administrators, while a fourth was Secretary and Comptroller-General of the National Debt Office. The mountaineer and education Geoffrey Winthrop Young was the second son of the fourth baronet, while the politician Hilton Young, 1st Baron Kennet was the third son of the fourth baronet.

As of 2026, the present holder of the title is Sir George Young, a Conservative politician who was appointed Chief Whip in October 2012 and created Baron Young of Cookham in 2015.

== Young baronets, of Formosa Place (1813) ==
- Sir Samuel Young, 1st Baronet (1766–1826)
- Sir George Young, 2nd Baronet (1797–1848)
- Sir George Young, 3rd Baronet (1837–1930)
- Sir George Young, 4th Baronet (1872–1952)
- Sir George Peregrine Young, 5th Baronet (1908–1960)
- George Samuel Knatchbull Young, Baron Young of Cookham, 6th Baronet (born 1941)

The heir apparent is the present holder's son the Hon. George "Gerry" Horatio Young (born 1966).

== Notes ==
Baronetage of the United Kingdom
| Preceded by Denys baronets | Young baronets of Formosa Place; 24 November 1813 | Succeeded by Macdonald baronets |
