= Gerard Mackworth Young =

British administrator

Gerard Mackworth-Young, CIE (7 April 1884 – 28 November 1965) was a British administrator in India and director of the British School at Athens from 1936 to 1946.

He was the eldest of four sons of Sir William Mackworth Young (1840–1924), KCSI, JP, of the Indian Civil Service, who was Lieutenant-Governor of the Punjab from 1897 to 1902, and his second wife Frances Mary, daughter of Sir Robert Eyles Egerton, KCSI, JP, Lieutenant-Governor of the Punjab from 1877 to 1882. Sir Robert Egerton was nephew of the 8th and 9th Grey Egerton baronets. Gerard's paternal grandfather was Sir George Young, 2nd Baronet; the name 'Mackworth' came from his paternal grandmother, Susan, daughter of William Mackworth-Praed, Serjeant-at-law, of that gentry family of Mickleham, Surrey. Gerard Mackworth Young assumed the surname of Mackworth-Young by deed poll in 1947.

Young's brothers Sir Hubert Winthrop Young, KCMG, and Sir Mark Aitchison Young, GCMG, were also colonial administrators. He was educated at Eton College and King's College, Cambridge, where he read classics. He entered the Indian Civil Service in 1907 by examination and, following in the footsteps of his father and grandfather, was assigned to the Punjab. After district service, he was appointed to a succession of Secretariat roles. He became an Under-Secretary to the Government of the Punjab in 1913, Under-Secretary to the Home Department of the government of India from 1916 to 1919, Deputy Commissioner of Delhi in 1921, Deputy Secretary of the Army Department of the Government of India in 1924, and Secretary to the Army Department in 1926. He retired in 1932 after reaching twenty-five years' service.

He enrolled in the British School at Athens as a student in 1932. In 1936, after two of the school's directors died in close succession, he was offered the directorship, despite his limited archaeological experience. During the Second World War, he returned to Indian where he was Joint Secretary of the War Department from 1941 to 1944. Returning to Athens after the war, he retired in 1946.

In 1916, he married Natalie Leila Margaret, daughter of Rt Hon Sir Walter Francis Hely Hutchinson, GCMG, Governor-General and Commander-in-Chief, Cape of Good Hope from 1901 to 1910, son of the 4th Earl of Donoughmore. The elder of their two sons (there being also two daughters) was the royal librarian Sir Robin Mackworth-Young.
