= Punjab Land Alienation Act, 1900 =

Punjab Alienation of Land Act, 1900

Repealed by
- A.O. 1950
- Status: Repealed

The Punjab Land Alienation Act, 1900 was a piece of legislation introduced by the British Raj with the aim of limiting the transfer of land ownership in Punjab Province. It created an "agricultural tribes" category, the membership of which was almost compulsory to buy or sell land.

== Background ==
The advent of British rule in India had led to a trend whereby ownership rights to land were increasingly concentrated in the hands of urban moneylenders and other commercial communities. They were assigned the property previously held by poor peasants, who either sold or mortgaged for the short-term benefit derived from the increasing values of land caused by improved agricultural methods, irrigation and communications. Such transfers were enforceable under law but, in British eyes, potentially damaging to their colonial administration because they might ultimately result in a disaffected rural peasant population. British law was effectively supporting the growth of a class of people — the new owners — that might prove detrimental to its own purpose. In addition, historian Kenneth Jones says that the transfers were contrary to British sentiments: "Not only did this development threaten the stability and peace of the Punjab, it also struck at the British self-image of benevolent and paternalistic protectors of the lowly peasant".

== Legal framework ==
=== Legislation ===
Concern about developments turned to serious debate in the 1890s and on 27 September 1899 the future Lieutenant-Governor of the Punjab, Charles Rivaz, presented the Imperial Legislative Council with a proposal titled the Punjab Alienation of Land Bill. (Note: Kenneth Jones says that Charles Rivaz was Lieutenant-Governor of the Punjab in 1899 but this is incorrect. He succeeded William Mackworth Young in that office in 1902.) The measure was viewed by educated Hindus in the province as another example of Raj discrimination against their interests. In classifying people as being either "agriculturalist" or "non-agriculturalist" and limiting the transfer of land between those two groups, they saw the measure as preventing free investment of capital and reducing their opportunity to acquire the status traditionally associated with land ownership. Moreover, with the majority of those classified as agriculturists being Muslim, the educated elite saw it as being anti-Hindu, just as their diminishing ability to gain government employment, which was once their preserve, was considered to be such. (Note: Hindus had traditionally been dominant in government offices but competition for such jobs became tougher from the 1880s for a variety of reasons rooted both in policy and in demographic changes. The Aitchison Commission was significant in this development.)

Rivaz's proposed legislation reignited the interest of elite Hindu Punjabis in the Congress and Indian Association political movements, which had waned during the decade. When the Congress delegates at the 1899 gathering in Lucknow supported opposition to the proposal, it created a rift between the organisation and Punjabi Muslims and peasants. However, factional disputes among the Punjabi elite — notably, between the Arya Samajists and the Brahmos — meant that this revived enthusiasm for Congress was short-lived.

=== Aftermath ===
The National Unionist Party was established as a consequence of the 1900 legislation to protect the interests of agriculturists. The subsequent Punjab Land Alienation Act of 1907 further restricted the transfer of land ownership between various groups.

== Amendments ==
=== 2019 Haryana amendment ===
In 2019, Haryana government passed the amendment to the Punjab Land Alienation Act, 1900 (PLPA), which had obtained ascent from the governor but has not yet been notified by the Haryana government, hence it is in limbo and has not become officially become a law. This amendment will reduce the Haryana’s Natural Conservation Zones (NCZs) by 47% or 60,000 acres from 122,113.30 hectares to only 64,384.66 hectares. This is in violation of multiple guidelines of the Supreme Court of India as well as "NCR Planning Board" (NCRPB) notification which states the original 122,113.30 hectares ecologically sensitive forest of South Haryana is a forest, "The major natural features, identified as environmentally sensitive areas, are the extension of Aravalli ridge in Rajasthan, Haryana and NCT-Delhi; forest areas; rivers and tributaries... major lakes and water bodies such as Badkhal lake, Suraj Kund and Damdama in Haryana sub-region". This area, as part of Northern Aravalli leopard and wildlife corridor, is an important habitat for the leopards in Haryana.

== See also ==
- Sindh Land Alienation Bill, 1947
