= Sir Samuel Young, 1st Baronet =

British colonial administrator

Sir Samuel Young Bt.
- Born: 23 February 1766; London
- Died: 14 December 1826 (aged 60); Formosa Place, Cookham, Berks
- Occupation: Colonial administrator
- Spouse(s): Emily Baring, granddaughter of Johann Baring
- Children: Sir George Young, 2nd Baronet
- Father: Admiral Sir George Young
- Honours: FRS

Sir Samuel Young, 1st Baronet (1766–1826) FRS, British colonial administrator with the East India Company.

== Biography ==
Samuel Young was born on 23 February 1766, the elder son of George Young (later Admiral Sir George Young), and his first wife Elizabeth, daughter of Samuel Bradshaw of Buckinghamshire. He went out to India as a civil servant of the East India Company and succeeded in making his reputation and fortune in the Presidencies of Calcutta and later Madras.

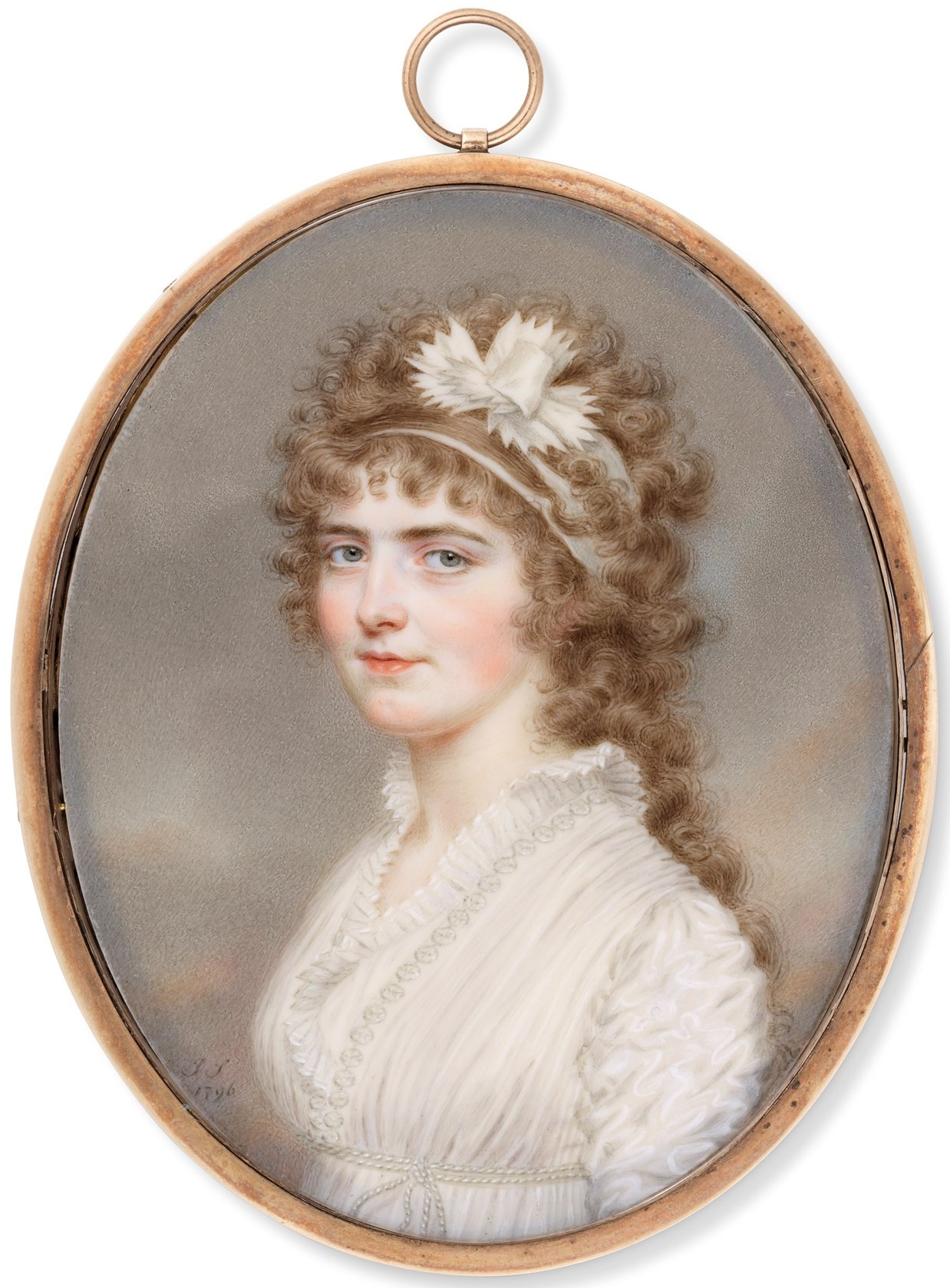
Portrait of Lady Young (née Baring) by John Smart

On 28 April 1796 he married Emily Baring (1775–1847), daughter of Charles Baring of Exmouth and granddaughter of Johann Baring whose family went on to found Barings Bank. Samuel and Emily had nine children, the eldest, George Young, later became Sir George Young, 2nd Baronet. Three of their sons followed their father's footsteps in the service of the East India Company.

In March 1795, after his return from India, he was elected a Fellow of the Royal Society.

At some point the benefit to a substantial debt from the Nabobs of the Carnatic Sultanate had been transferred to Samuel Young. In 1809 the debt due to Young was 10,000 Madras Pagodas, which in UK sterling, with interest added, was c. £7854, the modern day equivalent would be about £10 million.

Geoffrey Winthrop Young, who was Samuel Young's great-grandson wrote that Samuel was “small, narrow, obstinate, quarrelsome, a hedonist, and with the one merit of artistic taste and connoisseurship, which led to his fine collection of stones, jewels, pictures, shells, etc. and to his consorting with scientists such as Sir Joseph Banks”. In Winthrop Young's opinion Samuel was deplorable and he has said that his father always spoke of Samuel with contempt. However, Samuel was dead before either Winthrop Young or his father were born and their antipathy towards their own close ancestor ought be set against commonly held views which arose in the latter part of the eighteenth century about men who had enriched themselves through the East India Company, and who were even subject to satire on the stage in productions like Samuel Foote's play The Nabob.

In November 1813 Young was created 1st Baronet Young of Formosa Place in Berkshire. He was nominated as a sheriff of Berkshire in 1817.

Young died on 14 December 1826. There is a memorial wall tablet in Holy Trinity Church, Cookham dedicated to Sir Samuel Young, his wife Emily and Samuel's father, Admiral Sir George Young. There is also a tablet which commemorates his youngest son, Edward Lloyd who drowned in the Thames at the age of 7, and his youngest sister Maria.

== See also ==
- Young baronets of Formosa Place (1813)
