= John M. Berry (Minnesota politician) =

American judge

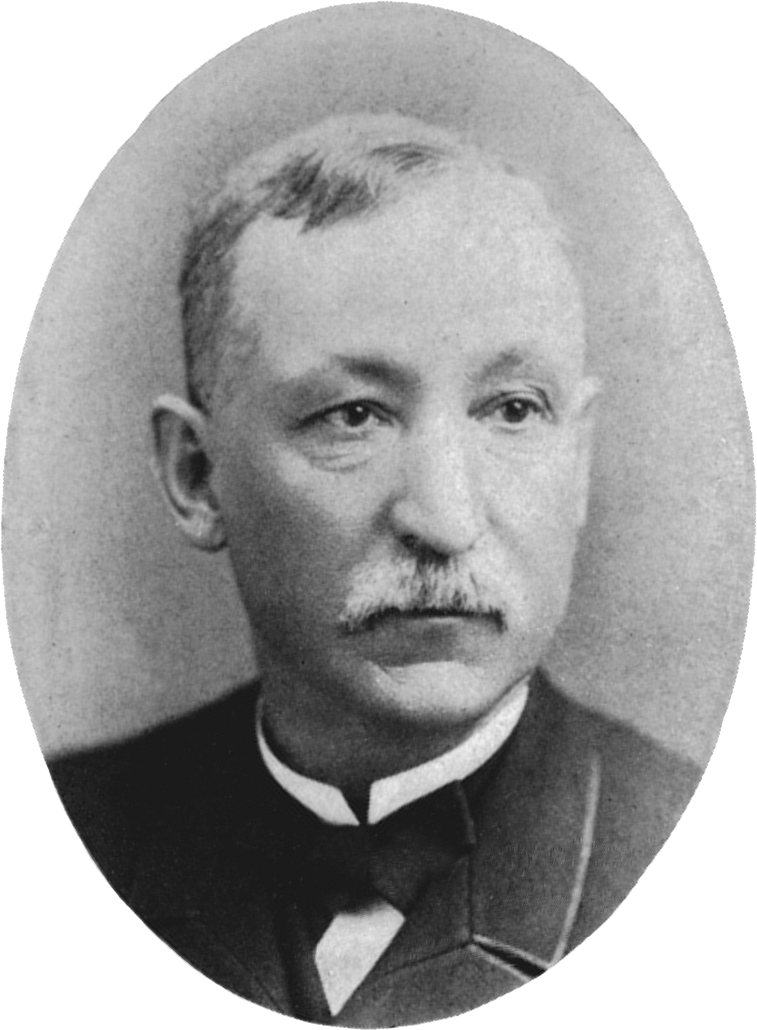

First Associate Justice of the Minnesota Supreme Court
- In office January 10, 1865 – November 8, 1887
- Preceded by: Thomas Wilson
- Succeeded by: Loren W. Collins

Member of the Minnesota Senate from the 8th district
- In office January 6, 1863 – January 2, 1865
- Preceded by: Michael Cook
- Succeeded by: Levi Nutting

Member of the Minnesota Territorial Council from the 8th district
- In office January 7, 1857 – December 2, 1857
- Preceded by: Benjamin F. Tillotson

Personal details
- Born: September 18, 1827 Pittsfield, New Hampshire, US
- Died: November 8, 1887 (aged 60)
- Resting place: Lakewood Cemetery
- Party: Republican
- Education: Yale University
- Occupation: Lawyer

John McDonogh Berry (September 18, 1827 – November 8, 1887) was an American politician and jurist.

Born in Pittsfield, New Hampshire, Berry went to Phillips Academy and received his bachelor's degree from Yale University. He studied law and was admitted to the New Hampshire bar in 1850. In 1853, Berry moved to Lanesboro, Minnesota Territory and then moved to Faribault, Minnesota in 1855. Berry served in the Minnesota Territorial House of Representatives in 1857 and in the Minnesota State Senate in 1863 and 1864. In 1879, Berry moved to Minneapolis, Minnesota. Berry served in the Minnesota Supreme Court from 1865 until his death in Minneapolis in 1887.

== Death ==
John McDonogh Berry died in his home the morning of November 8, 1887 from "creeping paralysis", likely Guillain-Barre syndrome. His remains were buried in Lakewood Cemetery with family and friends in attendance, including Governor Andrew Ryan McGill, Judge George B. Young, and Minnesota Secretary of State Hans Mattson. The Minnesota Supreme Court and state capitol were closed on the day of the services.
