= Hubert Winthrop Young =

British Colonial Governor

Major Sir Hubert Winthrop Young KCMG DSO
- Born: 6 July 1885; Wrexham, Denbighshire, Wales
- Died: 20 April 1950 (aged 64); Evora, Portugal
- Occupations: Soldier, diplomat and colonial governor
- Awards: Knight Commander of the Order of St Michael and St George (1934); Distinguished Service Order (1919); Order of El Nahda, 3rd Class (Kingdom of Hejaz) (1920)

Major Sir Hubert Winthrop Young, KCMG, DSO (6 July 1885 – 20 April 1950) was an English soldier in British Army and British Indian Army, Liberal Party politician, diplomat and colonial governor.

== Early life and army ==
Born on 6 July 1885, Young was the second son of colonial administrator William Mackworth Young and his second wife, Frances Mary, daughter of Sir Robert Eyles Egerton, KCSI, JP, Lieutenant-Governor of the Punjab from 1877 to 1882, Sir Robert Egerton was nephew of the 8th and 9th Grey Egerton baronets. Gerard's paternal grandfather was Sir George Young, 2nd Baronet. He was educated at Eton before being commissioned into the Royal Artillery in 1904. After four year he was transferred to the Indian Army as an officer in the 116th Mahrattas. Young served on the North West Frontier becoming an assistant political officer in Mesopotamia during the First World War. He was awarded the DSO for gallantry in Mezerib, Syria in September 1918.

== Diplomat ==
In 1919 Young joined the Foreign Office in London, after three years he was transferred to the Colonial Office as an assistant secretary in the Middle East Department. He was later appointed Colonial Secretary at Gibraltar. In 1929 he moved to Iraq and in 1932 was appointed the first Minister of Baghdad. He advocated for the creation of an independent Kurdistan.

After a few months he was appointed Governor of Nyasaland, the first of three governorships:

- Malawi (Nyasaland) - Governor (22 November 1932 to 9 April 1934)
- Northern Rhodesia - Governor (1935–1938)
- Trinidad and Tobago - Governor (8 July 1938 - 1942)

Young had been knighted in 1934 and in 1942 he returned to London where he organised European relief work until he retired in 1945.

He wrote the sympathetic book The Independent Arab, a part-memoir, part-travelogue detailing his diplomatic and military time in the Middle East.

== Politics ==
Following his retirement he took an interest in politics and stood twice as a candidate in the 1945 general election at Harrow West for the Liberal Party and again at a by-election in Edge Hill, Liverpool in 1947 without success. In February 1947 he was part of a group of Liberal candidates from the 1945 elections who signed up in support of the pamphlet 'Design For Freedom' which sought a merger of Liberals with Conservatives creating a new centre party.

== Family life ==
Young had married Margaret Rose Mary Reynold (d.1981) in London in 1924. Lady Young Road from Port of Spain to Barataria, Trinidad is named after her. They had three sons, Nicholas, Martin and Simon. Young died in Portugal on 20 April 1950.

His elder brother was archaeologist and colonial official Gerard Mackworth Young, director of the British School at Athens; their younger brother was Mark Aitchison Young, twice Governor of Hong Kong.
