= Governor of Punjab =

Governor of Punjab may refer to:

- List of governors of Punjab (British India), of the pre-independence Punjab province of British India
- List of governors of Punjab (India), of Punjab state in India
- Governor of Punjab, Pakistan, of Punjab province in Pakistan
