= Lawrence Johnstone Burpee =

Canadian librarian, historian and writer

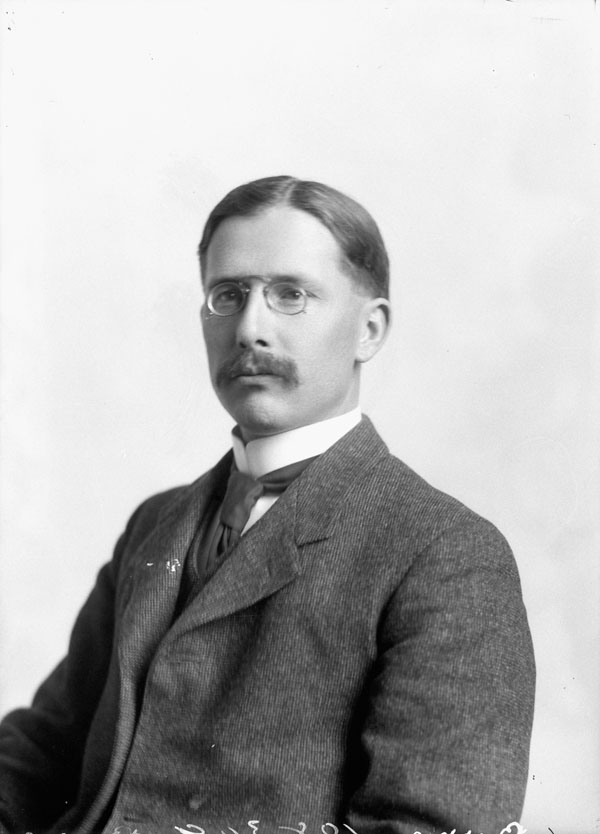
- Burpee, c. 1909
- Born: March 5, 1873; Halifax, Nova Scotia
- Died: October 13, 1946 (aged 73); Oxford, United Kingdom
- Occupations: Librarian, Writer
- Employer(s): International Joint Commission; Ottawa Public Library; Royal Society of Canada
- Awards: Fellow of the Royal Society of Canada; Prix d'Académie; J. B. Tyrrell Historical Medal (1931)

Lawrence Johnstone Burpee (Note: Middle name sometimes misspelt as Johnston) FRSC (March 5, 1873 – October 13, 1946) was a Canadian librarian, historian and author.

== Biography ==
Born in Halifax, Nova Scotia, he moved to Ottawa at an early age, where from 1890 to 1905 he worked as private secretary to three federal ministers of justice. The following seven years he was librarian at the Ottawa Public Library, before becoming Canadian Secretary of the International Joint Commission in 1912, a post he occupied until his death.

Burpee helped found the Canadian Historical Association in 1922 and was its first president until 1925. He also was president of the Royal Society of Canada in 1936/37. He published many books and articles mainly related to Canadian history and geography and was the founding editor of the Canadian Geographical Journal. He received the Royal Society of Canada's J. B. Tyrrell Historical Medal in 1931.

Burpee was a supporter of many causes, from the need for a national library to the independence of Poland. On the latter he published a 1939 wartime article "Poland's fight for freedom" in the Canadian Geographical Journal. On his way to Warsaw in 1946, Burpee died at Oxford, England. He is buried there, although he is also memorialized on a stone in Beechwood Cemetery.

== Selected publications ==
- Burpee, Lawrence J. The Oxford Encyclopaedia of Canadian History; London and Toronto, Oxford University Press 1926.
- Burpee, Lawrence J. ed with introduction, notes and chronological tables: An Historical Atlas of Canada; Toronto, Thomas Nelson and Sons, Ltd 1927
- Burpee, Lawrence J. trans. Journals and Letters of Pierre Gaultier de Varennes de la Verendrye and His Sons. Toronto: Champlain Society, 1927.
- Burpee, Lawrence J. The Discovery of Canada; Toronto, The Macmillan Company of Canada Ltd, 1948
- Burpee, Lawrence J. The Discovery of Canada; Ottawa, The Graphics Publishers Ltd., 1929

Professional and academic associations
Preceded by Reginald W. Brock and George A. Young	President of the Royal Society of Canada; 1936–1937	Succeeded by Archibald G. Huntsman
