= Sir George Young, 3rd Baronet =

British governmental administrator and scholar

Sir George Young, 3rd Baronet (1837–1930) was a British governmental administrator and scholar.

== Early life ==
George Young, 3rd Baronet (1837–1930) was born at Cookham on 15 September 1837, the oldest of the five sons of Sir George Young, 2nd Baronet and Susan Praed, the sister of Winthrop Mackworth Praed. Mackworth Young was one of his younger brothers.

Young succeeded his father to the baronetcy in February 1848 at the age of ten. He attended Eton and then studied at Trinity College, Cambridge where he was elected president of the Cambridge Union in 1860. He went on to study Law, qualified as a Barrister and was called to the bar by Lincoln's Inn in 1864 but he never practised at law.

== Parliament ==
He stood for parliament, as a Liberal candidate for Chippenham in the general election of November 1868. In the 1874 general election he was Liberal candidate for Plymouth. He stood again for Plymouth in the general election of April 1880 and in the bye-election held there in June 1880 (after the conservative Edward Bates had been unseated on the grounds of illegal payments by his agents). He was unsuccessful on each occasion.

== British Guiana ==
The 1868 election was held soon after the passage of the Reform Act 1867 which enfranchised many male householders, that greatly increased the number of men who could vote in elections in the United Kingdom and William Gladstone's Liberals increased their majority. Although Young wasn't elected, he was given a role within the Gladstone administration and was one of the three Royal Commissioners on Coolie Immigration who were appointed by the Colonial Office in 1870 to investigate the conditions of Chinese and Indian labourers in British Guiana (now known as Guyana) who had been brought there to work the sugar plantations after the abolition of slavery.

The commission's work involved spending several months in British Guiana, whilst there he joined a small group, led by Charles Barrington Brown, exploring the Kaieteur Waterfall on the River Potaro.

== UK civil service ==
After his return from British Guiana he married and began work as the secretary to the Bessborough commission on the working of the 1870 Irish Land Act. He drafted the commission's report, which made radical proposals for increasing the rights of tenants in Ireland. The report was published in 1881 and the year after its publication he accepted an invitation to become private secretary to Lord Frederick Cavendish, the newly installed chief secretary for Ireland; Young's telegram of acceptance was in Cavendish's pocket when he and Burke were murdered in Phoenix Park, Dublin.

In the summer of 1871 he became one of six assistant commissioners appointed to a Royal Commission to inquire into the working of friendly societies and charged with making a report with recommendations for further consolidation and amendment of the Friendly Societies Acts. The commission's report led to the Friendly Societies Act 1875.

In 1874 Gladstone's incumbent Liberals lost decisively, even though their party won a majority of the votes cast but Young's work on various government commissions continued, these included an appointment in 1875 as secretary to the Royal Commission, led by Sir James Fergusson, inquiring into the operation of the Factory and Workshop Acts. and later a permanent position with the Charity Commission.

He was appointed as Chief Charity Commissioner (1903–06).

== UK education ==
Young was a member of the Council of University College, London from 1875 and appointed President of the Senate (1881–86).

In 1882 he was appointed Charity Commissioner under the Endowed Schools Acts and in that role he gave evidence to the Royal Commission on Secondary Education (1895) led by Viscount Bryce. The Commission's report described him as "one of our most important witnesses", in his evidence he maintained that the numerous entrance scholarships offered for open competition at Oxford and Cambridge are having "an injurious effect on the Secondary Education of the middle classes". In his judgment such competitions, because they involve examinations imposed by authorities outside the schools, fetter the best teaching; they drag many schools into a curriculum little suited to the needs of their scholars.

== Personal life ==
=== Alpinism ===
Young was a keen mountaineer and "one of the pioneers of the Alps", being active in the Alps from his early twenties.

In 1865 Young and Hereford Brooke George, with the guide Christian Almer, established the first direct route up the Jungfrau from the Lauterbrunnen valley. They had to carry ladders with them in order to cross the many crevasses on the north flank. Having spent the night on the rocks of the Schneehorn (3,402 m or 11,161 ft), they gained the Silberlücke the following morning, the depression between the Jungfrau and Silberhorn, and from there in little more than three hours reached the summit. Descending to the Aletsch Glacier they crossed the Mönchsjoch, and passed a second night on the rocks, reaching Grindelwald the next day. Before the construction of the Jungfraujoch railway tunnel, the approach from the glaciers on the south side was very long. This new line became the established route until the opening of the Jungfraujoch tunnel.

However, in 1866, after he and two of his brothers had reached the summit of Mont Blanc, they took a slip on an icy slope; although it was a short fall and two of them were only slightly injured, their youngest brother, Bulkeley Young (1843-1866), broke his neck after landing badly and was killed. George Young was leading this party without guides and felt responsible for the incident; he never went mountaineering again and "If the Alps were mentioned in his presence, inadvertently, by a visitor, he would rise quietly and leave the room".

=== Family ===
On 10 October 1871 he married Alice Eacy (1840–1922) who, until she became a widow, had lived in India as Lady Lawrence, wife of Sir Alexander Hutchinson Lawrence, bt. the son of Brigadier General Sir Henry Lawrence who died in the Siege of Lucknow during the Indian Rebellion of 1857. They had a daughter, Eacy who died in childhood, and three sons, George Young (1872–1952), who was known as Georis and later became the 4th Baronet, Geoffrey Winthrop Young (1876-1958) and Edward Hilton Young (1879-1960) who became the 1st Baron Kennet.

Young died on 4 July 1930.

== See also ==
- Young baronets of Formosa Place (1813)
