= List of governors of Punjab =

List of governors of Punjab may refer to:

- List of governors of Punjab (British India), the pre-independence province of Punjab
- List of governors of Punjab (India) governors of Punjab state of India
- Governor of Punjab, Pakistan, governors of the Punjab province of Pakistan
