= Justice Young =

Justice Young may refer to:

- Clarence Clifton Young (1922–2016), justice of the Supreme Court of Nevada
- George B. Young (1840–1906), justice of the Minnesota Supreme Court
- Howard Young Sr. (1879–1961), justice of the Indiana Supreme Court
- John E. Young (1855–1926), justice of the New Hampshire Supreme Court
- Newton C. Young (1862–1923), justice of the North Dakota Supreme Court
- Richard M. Young (1798–1861), justice of the Supreme Court of Illinois
- Robert P. Young Jr. (born 1951), chief justice of the Michigan Supreme Court
- Ron Young (judge) (fl. 1980s–2010s), judge of the High Court of New Zealand

== See also ==
- Young Justice (disambiguation)
- Judge Young (disambiguation)
