= Ealing Acton =

UK Parliament constituency (1983–1997)

Coordinates: 51.51°N 0.28°W

- Former borough constituency for the House of Commons
- County: Greater London

1983–1997
- Seats: One
- Created from: Acton
- Replaced by: Ealing, Acton and Shepherd's Bush, Ealing North, Ealing Southall

Ealing Acton was a parliamentary constituency in West London, which returned one Member of Parliament (MP) to the House of Commons of the Parliament of the United Kingdom from 1983 until it was abolished for the 1997 general election.

== History ==
This safe Conservative seat was held by Sir George Young (sometimes known as the 'Bicycling Baronet') for the entire period of its existence.

== Boundaries ==
The London Borough of Ealing wards of Ealing Common, Hanger Lane, Heathfield, Pitshanger, Southfield, Springfield, Vale, and Victoria.

The constituency consisted of the eastern area of the London Borough of Ealing, in particular central Ealing and Acton. The boundary review implemented in 1997 meant that one seat was lost between the paired boroughs of Ealing and Hammersmith and Fulham. This resulted in the division of this seat. The majority of the constituents were placed into the new Ealing, Acton and Shepherd's Bush constituency.

== Members of Parliament ==
Election	Member	Party
1983	George Young	Conservative
1997	constituency abolished: see Ealing, Acton and Shepherd's Bush, Ealing North and Ealing Southall	

== Elections ==
1979 notional result
Party	Vote	%
Conservative	25,781	53.5
Labour	17,082	35.4
Liberal	4,452	9.2
Others	877	1.8
Turnout	48,192	
Electorate		

=== Elections in the 1980s ===
General election 1983: Ealing Acton
Party	Candidate	Votes	%	±%
Conservative	George Young	22,051	49.2	−4.3
Labour	Gareth Daniel	11,959	26.7	−8.7
SDP	Parry Mitchell	10,593	23.7	+14.4
Communist	S. Pulley	192	0.4	New
Majority		10,092	22.5	+4.5
Turnout		44,795	72.2	
Conservative hold		Swing	+2.2	

General election 1987: Ealing Acton
Party	Candidate	Votes	%	±%
Conservative	George Young	25,499	53.4	+4.2
Labour	Philip Portwood	13,256	27.8	+1.1
SDP	Stephen Brooks	8,973	18.8	−4.9
Majority		12,243	25.6	+3.1
Turnout		47,728	71.0	−1.2
Conservative hold		Swing	+1.6	

=== Elections in the 1990s ===
General election 1992: Ealing Acton
Party	Candidate	Votes	%	±%
Conservative	George Young	22,579	50.6	−2.8
Labour	Yvonne Johnson	15,572	34.9	+7.1
Liberal Democrats	Leslie Rowe	5,487	12.3	−6.5
Green	Astra Siebe	554	1.2	New
Ind. Conservative	Tom Pitt-Aikens	432	1.0	New
Majority		7,007	15.7	−9.9
Turnout		44,624	76.0	+5.0
Conservative hold		Swing	−5.0	

== See also ==
- List of parliamentary constituencies in London
