= Sindh Land Alienation Bill, 1947 =

Provincial land law

Sindh Land Alienation Bill of 1947 was a piece of legislation introduced by the British Sindh Assembly (now in Pakistan), with the aim of returning the mortgaged land to the owners, Similar to the Punjab Land Alienation Act of 1900.

== Background ==
The great economic depression caused by the World War I brought miseries to the rural people of Sindh as they were unable to pay taxes and purchase day-to-day needs, other than grain which was the only source of survival produced by themselves. Thus from the year 1917-1942, all agricultural land-owners drowned in the heavy debts by mortgaging their lands with the urban traders mainly Hindus. As this economic depression spread over the upcoming decades and another great war broke out among the European and Asian powers, the more and more people mortgaged their lands and as debts could not be repaid, the lands were transferred to the money lenders by the civil courts and who by year 1947 owned 40% of agricultural land in Sindh.

== Legislation ==
The Sind Provincial Legislative Assembly was established in 1937 under the India Act of 1935. Muhammad Hashim Gazdar, a member from Karachi tabled the Land Alienation bill in Legislative Assembly. Assembly passed that bill recommending returns of the mortgaged lands to owners, who had thus lost them between 1917 and 1947, free of compensation, on the plea that money lenders had already made more money than the original amount and thus repayment was not justified. This created a split between Hindus and Muslim members of the assembly. (Note: According to M. H. Panhwar "Money lenders were Hindus, but Hindu members too had supported the bill".)

== Aftermath ==
The bill for restoring the mortgaged lands to the owners was not allowed to become operative as a law by the newly-formed Government of Pakistan. The bill awaited formal assent of the Indian Viceroy in 1947, to go into effect as a law but the newly arrived Indian Viceroy left the decision of the implementation of the bill to the upcoming government of Pakistan. After the formation of Pakistan, alienation bill came up for the required assent before Jinnah as Governor General of Pakistan but was turned down by the Jinnah on the advice of Liaquat Ali Khan. Thereby, the 40% agricultural land transferred in the possession of outgoing Hindus in the rural areas of Sindh, lost by the Muslim Sindhi farmers due to mortgages, was allotted to the immigrants from India.

== See also ==
- Punjab Land Alienation Act, 1900
