= Hereford Brooke George =

English historian, barrister (1838–1910)

Hereford Brooke George (1838–1910) was an English barrister, academic and historian, also known as an alpinist.

== Life ==
Born at Bath, Somerset on 1 January 1838, he was eldest of the three children (two sons and a daughter) of Richard Francis George, surgeon, by his wife Elizabeth Brooke. He entered Winchester College as a scholar in 1849, and succeeded in 1856 to a fellowship at New College, Oxford. He obtained first classes in both classical and mathematical moderations in 1858, a second class in the final classical school in 1859, and a second class in the final mathematical-school in 1860. He graduated B.A. in 1860, proceeding M.A. in 1862.

George was called to the bar at the Inner Temple on 6 June 1864, and followed the western circuit till 1867, when he returned to New College as tutor in the combined school of law and history. He was ordained in 1868, but undertook no parochial work. After the separation of the law and history schools in 1872 he became history tutor of New College, and filled that office till 1891. He played a prominent part in the establishment of the inter-collegiate system of lecturing at Oxford. He remained a fellow of New College till his death.

George took a large part in the work of the university as well as in the re-organisation of his own college, which he described in his New College, 1850-1906 (1906). He was one of the first members of the Oxford University volunteer corps, and for many years he took an important share in the work of the local examinations delegacy.

George inherited money from his father, and was director of the West of England and South Wales Bank at Bristol, but took no active part in the management of its affairs. The failure of the bank in 1880 caused him financial losses, and involved him with his fellow-directors in an abortive trial for irregularities in keeping the accounts. He died at Holywell Lodge, Oxford, on 15 December 1910.

== Climber ==
George was the founder of the Oxford Alpine Club. On his first visit to Switzerland in 1860, he met Leslie Stephen at Zermatt and accompanied him up to the Riffel by the Gorner Glacier. In 1862 he accompanied Stephen on the first passage by the Jungfrau Joch, and achieved a first ascent of the Gross Fiescherhorn. In 1863 he made a passage of the Col du Tour Noir with Christian Aimer as guide, and investigated the relative positions of the heads of the Argentine, Tour, and Saline glaciers. His interest in climbing was chiefly geographical and scientific and he was one of the first Alpine climbers to employ photography.

In 1865 George and Sir George Young, with the guide Christian Almer, established the first direct route up the Jungfrau from the valley of Lauterbrunnen. They had to carry ladders with them in order to cross the many crevasses on the north flank. Having spent the night on the rocks of the Schneehorn (3,402 m or 11,161 ft) they gained next morning the Silberlücke, the depression between the Jungfrau and Silberhorn, and thence in little more than three hours reached the summit. Descending to the Aletsch Glacier they crossed the Mönchsjoch, and passed a second night on the rocks, reaching Grindelwald next day. Before the construction of the Jungfraujoch railway tunnel, the approach from the glaciers on the south side was very long. This new line became the established route until the opening of the Jungfraujoch tunnel.

In 1861 Cole joined the Alpine Club in 1861, and the establishment of the Alpine Journal was suggested at a meeting in his rooms at New College; he edited its first three volumes (1863-7). In 1866 he published The Oberland and its Glaciers, written to popularise the glacier theory of John Tyndall.

== Works ==
George's historical writing and teaching were largely concerned with military history (in which he was a pioneer at Oxford) and with the relationship between history and geography. His main publications were Battles of English History (1895), Napoleon's Invasion of Russia (1899), Relations of Geography and History (1901; 4th edit. 1910), and Historical Evidence (1909). He also compiled Genealogical Tables illustrative of Modern History (1874; 4th edit. 1904) and Historical Geography of the British Empire (1904; 4th edit. 1909). As an alpinist and traveller, he also wrote the book "The Oberland and its Glaciers" (1886), available on the database Viatimages

== Family ==
In 1870 George married Alice Bourdillon (d. 1893), youngest daughter of William Cole Cole of Exmouth, by whom he had two sons.

== Notes ==
Attribution

This article incorporates text from a publication now in the public domain: Stephen, Leslie, ed. (1885). "George, Hereford Brooke". Dictionary of National Biography. Vol. 2. London: Smith, Elder & Co.
