= Hilton Young, 1st Baron Kennet =

British politician (1879–1960)

The Right Honourable The Lord Kennet GBE DSO DSC & Bar PC
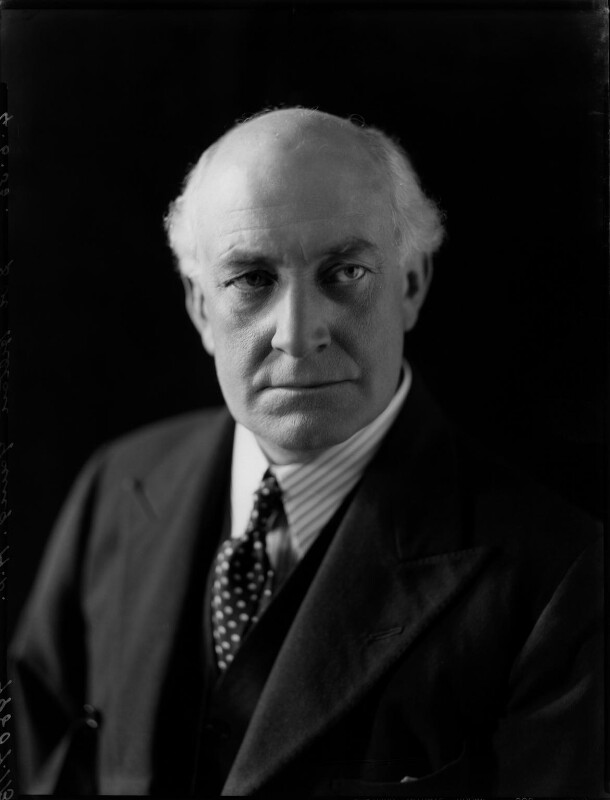

Minister of Health
- In office 5 November 1931 – 7 June 1935
- Prime Minister: Ramsay MacDonald
- Preceded by: Neville Chamberlain
- Succeeded by: Kingsley Wood

National Liberal Chief Whip
- In office 20 December 1922 – 13 November 1923
- Leader: David Lloyd George
- Preceded by: Charles McCurdy
- Succeeded by: Party merged with Liberals

Financial Secretary to the Treasury
- In office 21 April 1921 – 19 October 1922
- Prime Minister: David Lloyd George
- Preceded by: Stanley Baldwin
- Succeeded by: John Hills

Member of Parliament for Sevenoaks
- In office 30 May 1929 – 19 July 1935
- Preceded by: Walter Styles
- Succeeded by: Charles Ponsonby

Member of Parliament for Norwich
- In office 29 October 1924 – 30 May 1929
- Preceded by: Walter Smith
- Succeeded by: Walter Smith
- In office 6 February 1915 – 6 December 1923
- Preceded by: Frederick Low
- Succeeded by: Walter Smith

Personal details
- Born: Edward Hilton Young; 20 March 1879
- Died: 11 July 1960 (aged 81)
- Party: Conservative (1926–1960)
- Other political affiliations: Liberal (Before 1916, 1923–1926); Coalition Liberal (1916–1922); National Liberal (1922–1923)
- Spouse: Kathleen Scott (m. 1922; died 1947)
- Children: Wayland Young, 2nd Baron Kennet
- Parents: Sir George Young, 3rd Baronet (father); Alice Eacy Kennedy (mother)
- Relatives: Sir George Young, 4th Baronet (brother); Geoffrey Winthrop Young (brother)
- Education: Northaw Place; Marlborough College; Eton College; University College London; Trinity College, Cambridge
- Occupation: Politician and writer

Edward Hilton Young, 1st Baron Kennet (20 March 1879 – 11 July 1960) was a British politician and writer.

== Family and early life ==
Young was the youngest son of Sir George Young, 3rd Baronet (see Young baronets), a noted classicist and charity commissioner. Sir George's paternal great-grandmother was Emily Baring of the eponymous merchant banking dynasty. Hilton's mother, formerly Alice Eacy Kennedy, was of Dublin Irish Protestant background and had previously lived in India as Lady Lawrence, wife of Sir Alexander Lawrence, Bt, nephew to the Viceroy, Lord Lawrence. Widowed when Sir Alexander died in a bridge collapse, Alice returned to England, marrying Sir George in 1871. Hilton was the youngest of three sons and one daughter (who died aged 14) born to the couple. The oldest brother, also George, would become a diplomat and Ottoman scholar. The next brother, Geoffrey Winthrop Young, became a noted educator and mountaineer. Their childhood was spent at the family's Thames-side 'Formosa' estate, at Cookham, Berkshire. On visits to their London house near Sloane Square, Hilton would often play in Kensington Gardens with the children of Sir George's friend, Sir Leslie Stephen. In this way, he commenced a close friendship with his contemporary Thoby Stephen, and became acquainted with Thoby's siblings, Vanessa, Virginia, and Adrian.

At his preparatory school, Northaw Place, in 1892 Young took pity on nine-year-old Clement Attlee on the latter's first day at school, offering the newcomer jam from his own pot. His secondary schooling commenced at Marlborough but incessant bullying saw him transferred to Eton where he joined the army stream which emphasised science rather than the classics. After two terms studying chemistry at University College London, he went up to Trinity College, Cambridge in October 1897, graduating in 1900 with a 'first' in natural sciences and having achieved the office of president of the Union Society.

== Early career ==
Post-Cambridge he read for the Bar and was called by the Inner Temple in 1904. However, after receiving few briefs and suffering a nervous breakdown, he transferred to financial journalism. In 1908, he was appointed assistant editor of The Economist, resigning in 1910 to become city editor of The Morning Post. His 1912 work Foreign Companies and Other Corporations combined his legal and financial knowledge to examine the status of companies created in one national jurisdiction which operate in other jurisdictions.

At Cambridge, through Thoby Stephen, he became acquainted with key members of what would become known as the ‘Bloomsbury group’. He attended the group's early gatherings at Gordon Square and Fitzroy Square, and became attracted to Virginia Stephen, to whom he proposed on a punt on the Cam in May 1909, only to be rejected. Another Cambridge friendship, made through his brother Geoffrey, was with G. M. Trevelyan and in Spring 1906 he accompanied the historian during a retracement of the route of Garibaldi's retreat which became the basis for Trevelyan's Garibaldi trilogy. The second work in the trilogy—Garibaldi and the Thousand—was dedicated to the Young brothers and contained 15 photographs taken by Hilton.

== First World War ==
Enlisting in the Royal Naval Volunteer Reserve on 22 August 1914 and commissioned in September, he served in a wide variety of theatres and actions in the First World War, including the Grand Fleet at Scapa Flow.

He served on HMS Cyclops then HMS Iron Duke from September 1914. That autumn he wrote to his brother that it was “really rather wonderful” to be serving on Admiral Jellicoe's flagship. In a letter in October he mentioned a sailors’ entertainment for “the admiral’s” benefit including some sailors dancing the can-can. However, by February 1915 he was chafing at the “inoccupation” of the Grand Fleet, in the absence of any major sea battle.

A literary consequence of his war service was A Muse at Sea, a compilation of his poems initially published in the Ducal Weekly (the Iron Duke's newspaper), and also in the Morning Post, the Cornhill Magazine and the Nation. He also rendered other types of service to his friends Lytton Strachey and Clive Bell during the War. In 1908 he had bought a thatched cottage for weekend use, The Lacket, at Lockeridge near Marlborough. During 1914–15 he rented the cottage to Strachey who drafted the first two chapters of his Eminent Victorians there.

While on active service on Iron Duke, in February 1915 he was elected unopposed as a Liberal MP at a by-election for the seat of Norwich.

In April 1915, he received a letter from Vanessa Bell, in response to his request for a letter making no mention of the war, telling him of the doings of the Bloomsbury Set, including “Bertie” Russell, Lytton Strachey and Ottoline Morrell. In May 1915, while still serving on HMS Iron Duke, the first edition of his System of National Finance appeared. Through further editions in 1924 and 1936, it remained the standard work on Westminster's budgetary processes until well into the 1950s.

In September 1915, he took part Admiral Troubridge's mission to the Danube, whose aim was to stop the Austro-Hungarians sending supplies via the Black Sea to Gallipoli (in the absence of a direct land link, as Bulgaria did not join the Central Powers until October). The following month he heard his first shot fired in anger when an Austrian sentry fired a rifle at his ship.

Later in the war, Young served on Harwich light cruisers, naval siege guns at Flanders, the Zeebrugge Raid in which, commanding a rear gun on HMS Vindictive, he was severely wounded, necessitating the amputation of his right arm, and, finally, in the Russian campaign, commanding an armoured train on the line south of Archangel.

His war service brought the awards of the Distinguished Service Order, Distinguished Service Cross and Bar, French Croix de guerre, and the Serbian Silver Medal. He recounted his war experiences in his 1920 memoir, By Sea and Land.

== Post-war career ==
Post-war, he started his rise up the political ladder in February 1919 when he was appointed Parliamentary Private Secretary to H. A. L. Fisher, President of the Board of Education. In April 1921, he was promoted to Financial Secretary to the Treasury. In this capacity, he was the link between the government and the 'Geddes Axe', the committee of business experts established by Lloyd George in the aftermath of the First World War to undertake a fundamental review of government expenditure in the hope of identifying major savings.

In March 1922, Young married sculptor Kathleen Scott, née Bruce, widow of Captain Robert Falcon Scott. With the marriage, he became stepfather to Kathleen's son, the future naturalist and yachtsman, Peter Scott. In August 1923, Kathleen gave birth, aged 45, to their son Wayland Young, who became a writer and Labour politician.

Through Cambridge and Bloomsbury, Young had a long-standing friendship with E. M. Forster. Suffering writer's block while working on A Passage to India, the novelist was Young's guest at The Lacket in early May 1922. Shortly afterwards he wrote to Young declaring, "an unfinished novel’s before me now, and sometimes I work at it with distaste and despair…You certainly have done more than any individual I know to help me by direct remarks. Your knowledge of the business of creating seemed to me profounder than that possessed by so-called artists." These comments suggest that Young gave Forster significant advice and encouragement at a crucial stage on work on the latter's eventual masterpiece.

Out of office with the advent of Bonar Law's Conservative administration (following the Carlton Club meeting in October 1922), he became Chief Whip for the Lloyd George Liberals and a Privy Counsellor. Speaking at the Gresham's School prize-giving on 13 July 1923, Young "...recommended the boys to go in for great risks and dangerous deeds. Let them have adventure, and the madder the adventure, the better." He lost his Norwich seat at the December 1923 General Election. Although he won the seat back at the October 1924 General Election, he devoted the rest of the 1920s to furthering his business interests.

In the City of London, Young became editor of the Financial News, 1926–29, when he introduced an Arts page which was continued by the Financial Times when they were merged in 1946. He also joined the boards of the Southern Railway, English Electric, and Hudson's Bay Company. For Westminster he became a peripatetic financial- and political-troubleshooter, undertaking inter alia financial missions to Poland (1922–3) and Iraq (1925, 1930) intended to stabilise the financial positions of these countries, the former recreated and he latter newly created after World War I. The 1930 Iraq mission saw him recommend the establishment of an Iraq Currency Board to issue a national currency, the dinar, to replace Indian rupees issued as temporary currency when British forces displaced the Ottomans from the former Mesopotamia during the First World War. The Iraqi government accepted Young's recommendations in relation to the nation's currency and he became the inaugural chairman of the Iraq Currency Board on 11 June 1931. He also chaired the 1925–6 Royal Commission on Indian Currency and Finance (at which his friend Maynard Keynes was a key witness) and the 1927–8 East African Commission on Closer Union.

Young joined the Conservative Party in 1926 during his term as MP for Norwich. He served as a delegate to the Assembly of the League of Nations, 1926 and 1927. In 1927 he was appointed Knight Grand Cross of the Order of the British Empire (GBE). He became MP for Sevenoaks in 1929 and served as Minister for Export Credits from 1929 and Minister of Health between 1931 and 1935. The health portfolio also included responsibility for housing, including slum clearance and rehousing. Key items of legislation to which he contributed in this period were: the Town and Country Planning Act 1932 (which applied to all 'developable' land), the Housing Act 1935 (which laid down standards of accommodation) and the Restriction of Ribbon Development Act 1935 (which sought to consolidate urban development and restrict ribbon sprawl along major highways). He retired from politics in July 1935 and was created Baron Kennet.

== After politics ==
Away from politics, he could now resume his life in business. By 1940, Lord Kennet was either chairman or a director of eight listed companies, which apart from the Southern Railway and timber merchants, Denny, Mott and Dickson Ltd, were engaged in the financial services and property sectors. In May 1940, he resumed his former role as chairman of the Iraq Currency Board when Leo Amery, who had replaced him as chairman in 1932, resigned on becoming a member of the wartime government. His political and financial experience made him a natural choice to chair the Capital Issues Committee during 1937–59. Responsible for advising the Chancellor of the Exchequer "on applications to issue capital for any purpose anywhere", this committee was particularly important during World War II when it had to approve all issues of shares and securities with face values exceeding £10,000.

Although he never regretted his support for the two World Wars fought – as he saw it – to resist German aggression, after the Second World War he became a pacifist, feeling that nuclear weapons meant that the cost of any future war outweighed any possible benefit.

He died at the Lacket on 11 July 1960, aged 81, and was succeeded to the Kennet peerage by his son Wayland.

== Arms ==
Coat of arms of Hilton Young, 1st Baron Kennet
| Crest A demi-unicorn couped Ermine, armed, maned, and hoofed Or, gorged with a naval crown Azure supporting an anchor erect Sable. Escutcheon Per fesse Sable and Argent: in chief two lions rampant-guardant, and in base an anchor erect with a cable, all counterchanged. Motto In College Domus (A House on a Hill) |

== See also ==
- Young baronets of Formosa Place (1813)

Parliament of the United Kingdom
| Preceded by George Roberts and Sir Frederick Low | Member of Parliament for Norwich; 1915–1923; With: George Roberts | Succeeded by Dorothy Jewson and Walter Smith |
| Preceded by Dorothy Jewson and Walter Smith | Member of Parliament for Norwich; 1924–1929; With: J. Griffyth Fairfax | Succeeded by Walter Smith and Geoffrey Shakespeare |
| Preceded by Walter Styles | Member of Parliament for Sevenoaks; 1929–1935 | Succeeded by Charles Ponsonby |
Political offices
| Preceded by Stanley Baldwin | Financial Secretary to the Treasury; 1921–1922 | Succeeded by John Hills |
| Preceded by Neville Chamberlain | Minister of Health; 1931–1935 | Succeeded by Sir Kingsley Wood |
Party political offices
| Preceded by Charles McCurdy | National Liberal Chief Whip; 1922–1923 | Party merged with the Liberals |
Media offices
| Preceded by Laming Worthington-Evans | Editor of the Financial News; 1925–1929 | Succeeded by Oscar Hobson |
Peerage of the United Kingdom
| New creation | Baron Kennet; 1935–1960 | Succeeded by Wayland Young |
