= Robin Mackworth-Young =

British academic and librarian

Sir Robin Mackworth-Young
- Born: 12 February 1920
- Died: 5 December 2000 (aged 80)
- Education: Eton College
- Alma mater: King's College, Cambridge
- Spouse: Rosemarie née Aue (m. 1953)
- Children: 1 son (Charles, b. 1954)

Sir Robert Christopher 'Robin' Mackworth-Young GCVO (12 February 1920 – 5 December 2000), was a British academic and librarian, who served as Royal Librarian from 1958 until 1985.

== Early life and education ==
The son of Gerard Mackworth Young, a civil servant in British India, and Natalie née Hely-Hutchinson, he was educated at Eton College and King's College, Cambridge, where he was President of the Union.

== Second World War ==
Upon the outbreak of the Second World War, Mackworth-Young was commissioned into the Royal Air Force, seeing active service in the Middle East and the Normandy Campaign. Promoted Squadron Leader, in 1948 he left the RAF to join the Foreign Office.

== Royal Librarian ==
In 1955, Mackworth-Young was appointed as librarian to the Royal Household at Windsor Castle. In 1958 he succeeded Sir Owen Morshead as Royal Librarian. In 1961 he was appointed a Member of the Royal Victorian Order, being promoted Knight Commander in 1975 and Knight Grand Cross in 1985. Elected FSA and Hon FLA, he was a member of the Roxburghe Club from 1965. Upon his retirement in 1985 Sir Robin was given ad vitam the honorary title of Emeritus Librarian by Elizabeth II.

=== Publications ===
- Sandringham (1978)
- The History & Treasures Of Windsor Castle (1980)
- Windsor Castle (1997)

== Family ==
He married in 1953, Rosemarie, daughter of Major Werner Carl Rudolph Aue OBE (1891–1977), of Menton, France, leaving an only child:

- Professor Charles Gerard Mackworth-Young CVO FRCP (born 1954), Prime Warden Goldsmith (2023/24), married 1981 Lady Iona Lindsay, younger daughter of Robert, 29th Earl of Crawford and Balcarres KT GCVO, having one son and two daughters.
