= Charles Montgomery Rivaz =

Sir Charles Montgomery Rivaz
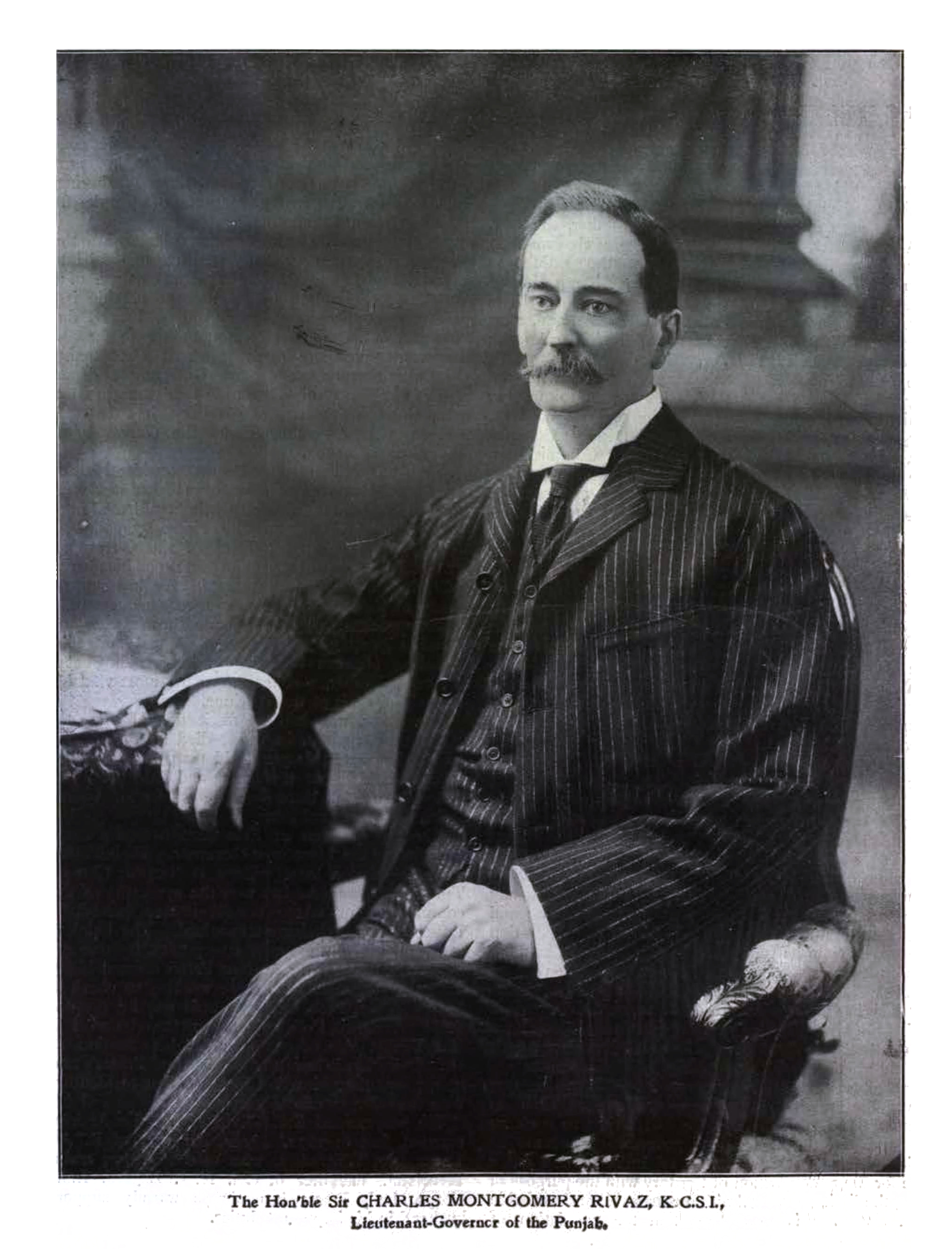
- Rivaz in British India

Lieutenant-Governor of the Punjab
- In office 6 March 1902 – 1907
- Preceded by: Sir Mackworth Young
- Succeeded by: Sir Denzil Ibbetson

Personal details
- Born: March 11, 1845 Watford Hall, Watford, England
- Died: October 7, 1926 London, England
- Spouse: Emilie Agnew
- Children: Frank, Cecil, Percy
- Occupation: Colonial administrator

Sir Charles Montgomery Rivaz KCSI (11 March 1845 – 7 October 1926) was a colonial administrator in British India, and Lieutenant-Governor of the Punjab (1902–1907).

== Biography ==
Rivaz was born in 1845, the son of John Theophilus Rivaz, of Watford Hall, Watford, who served as a civilian for 30 years in the North-Western Provinces (modern Pakistan), by Mary Anne Lambert. His maternal grandfather had also served in India, in the Bengal Civil Service, and three brothers all served or held office in British India, including Colonel Vincent Francis Rivaz, CB (1842–1924). He was educated at Blackheath Proprietary School, and went to Punjab in 1864.

Rivaz served in various posts in Punjab. He was for a time superintendent of the Kapurthala State, later a 1st Finance Commissioner and Member of the Legislative Council of Punjab Province. He was a temporary Member of the Council of the Viceroy of India from 1897, and a permanent member from May 1898. In 1899, he was responsible for proposing what became the Punjab Land Alienation Act, 1900.

On 6 March 1902 he took up the position as Lieutenant-Governor of the Punjab, where he is remembered for promoting irrigation.

He was appointed a Companion of the Order of the Star of India (CSI) in the Birthday Honours List on 25 May 1895, and in the 1901 New Year Honours list was promoted to a Knight Commander (KCSI) of the same order.

He died at his residence in London on 7 October 1926.

Rivaz married, in 1874, Emilie Agnew, daughter of Major-General Agnew. Lady Rivaz died at Kensington on 2 January 1941. They had three sons; Frank was a farmer in Palermo, Ontario, another, Cecil, was in the civil service in India, and the youngest, Percy, was a ship's surgeon for the British fleet in the Mediterranean.

Government offices
Preceded by Sir Mackworth Young	Lieutenant-Governor of the Punjab; 1902–1907	Succeeded by Sir Denzil Ibbetson
