= Young Justice (disambiguation) =

Young Justice is a DC Comics superhero team.

Young Justice may also refer to:

- Young Justice (TV series), an American animated superhero TV series based on the comic, which technically is not a direct adaption of the Young Justice comic book series by Peter David, Todd Dezago, and Todd Nauck.
- Young Justice: Legacy, an action-adventure video game based on the television series
- Young Justice (rapper), an affiliate of the Wu-Tang Clan

== See also ==
- Young Justice Bao, 1994 Singaporean TV series
- Justice Young (disambiguation)
