= Judge Young =

Judge Young may refer to:

- Don John Young (1910–1996), judge of the United States District Court for the Northern District of Ohio
- George C. Young (1916–2015), judge of the United States District Courts for the Northern, Middle, and Southern Districts of Florida
- George M. Young (1870–1932), judge of the United States Customs Court
- Gordon Elmo Young (1907–1969), judge of the United States District Court for the Eastern District of Arkansas
- James Scott Young (1848–1914), judge of the United States District Court for the Western District of Pennsylvania
- Joseph H. Young (1922–2015), judge of the United States District Court for the District of Maryland
- Richard L. Young (born 1953), judge of the United States District Court for the Southern District of Indiana
- Roderick C. Young (born 1966), judge of the United States District Court for the Eastern District of Virginia
- William G. Young (born 1940), judge of the United States District Court for the District of Massachusetts

== See also ==
- John Milton Younge (born 1955), judge of the United States District Court for the Eastern District of Pennsylvania
- Justice Young (disambiguation)
