= Young baronets of Partick (1945) =

Escutcheon of the Young baronets of Partick

The Young baronetcy, of Partick in the County of the City of Glasgow was created in the Baronetage of the United Kingdom on 7 September 1945 for Arthur Young, who represented Glasgow Partick and Glasgow Scotstoun in the House of Commons as a Conservative. It is held as of 2026 by Sir Stephen Young QC, Sheriff Principal of Grampian, Highland and Islands.

== Young baronets, of Partick (1945) ==
- Sir Arthur Stewart Leslie Young, 1st Baronet (1889–1950)
- Sir Alastair Spencer Templeton Young, 2nd Baronet (1918–1963)
- Sir Stephen Stewart Templeton Young, 3rd Baronet (born 1947)

The heir apparent is the present holder's son Charles Alastair Stephen Young (born 1979).
