= Sir George Young, 2nd Baronet =

British colonial administrator

Sir George Young, 2nd Baronet (1797–1848) was a British Royal Navy officer who served 1818–1841.

== Biography ==
George Young was born on 19 August 1797, the oldest son of Sir Samuel Young, 1st Baronet.

On 11 April 1811, in his 14th year, he entered the Royal Navy. He became a Lieutenant in 1818 and between October 1825 - May 1826 he was the Commanding Officer of the "Beaver", a 10 gun sloop on the Jamaica Station in the Caribbean. He was promoted to Captain on 23 November 1841.

He succeeded his father to the baronetcy on 14 December 1826 and married Susan Praed, the sister of Winthrop Mackworth Praed, on 23 June 1835. They went on to have six children, 5 boys and one girl, the oldest of their sons became the third baronet and the father of Geoffrey Winthrop Young and another, William Mackworth Young became the Lieutenant-Governor or the Punjab.

Following the Slavery Abolition Act, Young was involved in a compensation claim relating to the release of 353 enslaved people from Baillie's Bacolet, Grenada. Young was one of two trustees "for parties interested under the marriage settlement of Miss Collin Campbell Baillie (1781-1830)" who had married Edward Lloyd in London in 1816 and was the daughter of James Baillie who had owned Baillie's Bacolet estate until his death in 1793. The claim, in 1836, amounted to £8985 17s 2d.

George Young died at Formosa Place, Cookham, Berks, on 8 February 1848. He is commemorated by a memorial wall tablet in Holy Trinity Church, Cookham there is also a tablet which commemorates his youngest brother, Edward Lloyd who drowned in the Thames at the age of 7.

== See also ==
- Young baronets of Formosa Place (1813)
