= Sir Stephen Young, 3rd Baronet =

Scottish baronet and sheriff

Sir Stephen Stewart Templeton Young, 3rd Baronet, QC, is a Scottish baronet and held the post of Sheriff Principal of Grampian, Highland and Islands from 2001 until 2012. He is the third Baronet of Partick.

He gained an MA degree from Oxford University and an LLB degree from the University of Edinburgh.

He was appointed Sheriff Principal of Grampian, Highlands and Islands in 2001, a position he held until 2012.

He became a QC in 2002 and in 2005 was appointed Chairman of the Sheriff Court Rules Council.

He is also ex officio a Commissioner of the Northern Lighthouse Board, and a Governor of The Robert Gordon University.

== Arms ==
Coat of arms of Sir Stephen Young, 3rd Baronet
Crest A lymphad Or under full sail its sail charged of the arms having a pennon Gules with the badge of Scotland in the hoist. Escutcheon Argent on three piles issuant from a chief Sable charged with three lymphads Or under full sail Argent flagged Gules as many annulets of the third. Motto Serve Wisely With Faith

Baronetage of the United Kingdom
Preceded by Alastair Spencer Templeton Young	Baronet (of Partick); 1963–present	Incumbent
