= George Ashworth Young =

Australian rules footballer

George Young

Personal information
- Full name: George Ashworth Young
- Born: 19 October 1878; Melbourne, Victoria
- Died: 5 October 1920 (aged 41); Cheltenham, Victoria
- Original team: Ascot Vale

Playing career^{1}
Years	Club	Games (Goals)
1898–99	Carlton	15 (1)
- ^{1} Playing statistics correct to the end of 1899.

George Ashworth Young (19 October 1878 – 5 October 1920) was an Australian rules footballer who played with Carlton in the Victorian Football League (VFL).
