= Aitchison Commission =

1886 Indian civil service investigation

The Aitchison Commission (Public Service Commission) was set up in 1886 under the chairmanship of Sir Charles Umpherston Aitchison, the lieutenant governor of Punjab, to examine the circumstances under which Indians could be appointed to higher posts in public service previously reserved for Europeans.

== Background ==
The commission made the following recommendations in its report submitted in 1887:

1. The two-tier classification of civil services into covenanted and uncovenanted should be replaced by a three-tier classification: Imperial, provincial and subordinate civil services.
2. The maximum age for entry into civil services should be 23 years.
3. The statutory civil service system of recruitment should be abolished.
4. The competitive exam should not be held simultaneously in England and India
5. Certain percentage of posts in the imperial civil service should be filled by promotion of the members of provincial civil service.

The above recommendations were implemented in 1892, and consequently the statutory civil service was abolished.
