= Thomas Gordon Walker =

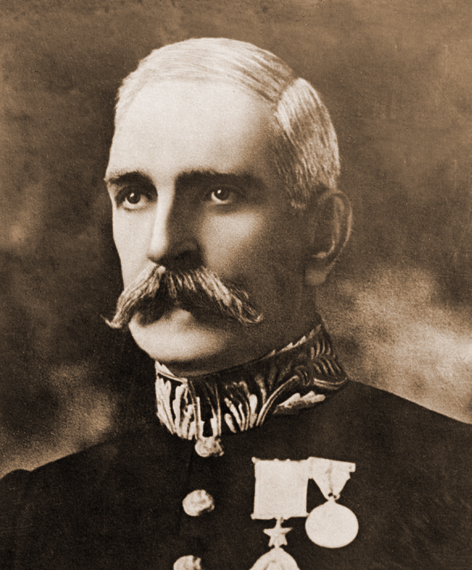
Former Governor of Punjab

Sir Thomas Gordon Walker KCIE CSI (14 September 1849 – 27 November 1917) was a British Indian civil servant.

== Early life and career ==
Born to Reverend Henry Walker, he was educated in the Old Gymnasium and University of Aberdeen.

He joined I.C.S., as Assistant Commissioner in the Punjab, 1872; Settlement Officer, 1877–81; Registrar, Chief Court, 1881–88; Commissioner of Excise, 1888–99; Judge. Chief Court, Punjab, 1898–02; Commissioner, Delhi Division, 1901–05; Financial Commissioner, Punjab, and Member, Imperial Legislative Council, 1905–06; Lieut.-Governor, Punjab, 1907–08. He also served as a vice-chancellor of University of the Punjab.

Member, Durbar Coronation Committee, 1902–03; retired, 1912; m. Adela, d. of Rev. Arthur Irwin, Rector of Napton, Warwickshire, 1879.
