= Sir George Young, 5th Baronet =

English diplomat

Sir George Peregrine Young, 5th Baronet (8 September 1908 – 17 March 1960), known as Gerry Young, was a British diplomat.

== Life ==
Gerry Young, the first son of Sir George Young, 4th Baronet, was born on 8 September 1908. He was educated at Westminster School and went on to Christ Church, Oxford, graduating in 1929. He was then awarded a Laming Travelling Fellowship at Queen's College, Oxford, which meant spending nine months learning modern languages overseas.

After graduation he entered the Diplomatic Service and over the course of his career he served in Madrid, Berlin, Peking, Beirut, Rio de Janeiro and Rome. In 1953 he was seconded to the Cabinet Office before returning to the Foreign Office in 1955-6 as head of the News Dept. In 1956 He became deputy to the Ambassador in Paris.

Whilst serving in Peking he became engaged to the daughter of Sir Hughe Knatchbull-Hugesson, who at the time was the British ambassador there; they married on 14 February 1939. He was appointed Companion of the Order of St Michael and St George (CMG) in the 1951 Birthday Honours and became the 5th Baronet, on the death of his father, in 1952. Young died on 17 March 1960.

== See also ==
- Young baronets of Formosa Place (1813)
