= Baron Kennet =

Title in the Peerage of the United Kingdom

Baron Kennet, of the Dene in the County of Wiltshire, is a title in the Peerage of the United Kingdom. It was created in 1935 for the journalist and politician Sir Hilton Young. He was the youngest son of Sir George Young, 3rd Baronet, of Formosa Place. He was succeeded by his son, the second Baron. He was a writer and politician. As of 2010, the title is held by his son, the third Baron, who succeeded in 2009. As a great-grandson of Sir George Young, 3rd Baronet, of Formosa Place, he is also in remainder to this title.

The first Baron was married to the sculptor Kathleen Scott, widow of the polar explorer Robert Falcon Scott, the second to Elizabeth Young.

== Barons Kennet (1935) ==
- (Edward) Hilton Young, 1st Baron Kennet (1879–1960)
- Wayland Hilton Young, 2nd Baron Kennet (1923–2009)
- William Aldus Thoby Young, 3rd Baron Kennet (b. 1957)

The heir apparent is the present holder's son, the Hon. Archibald Wayland Keyes Young (b. 1992)

== Arms ==
Coat of arms of Baron Kennet
Crest A demi-unicorn couped Ermine, armed, maned, and hoofed Or, gorged with a naval crown Azure supporting an anchor erect Sable. Escutcheon Per fesse Sable and Argent: in chief two lions rampant-guardant, and in base an anchor erect with a cable, all counterchanged. Motto In College Domus (A House On A Hill)

== See also ==
- Young baronets of Formosa Place
