= Sir George Young, 4th Baronet =

English diplomat, journalist and ottoman scholar

Sir George Young 4th Baronet
- Born: 25 October 1872; England
- Died: 26 September 1952 (aged 79); Sonning, Berkshire, England
- Education: Eton College
- Alma mater: Universities in France, Germany, and Russia
- Occupations: Diplomat, journalist, writer
- Known for: Corps de Droit Ottoman (editor), advocacy for Republican Spain
- Notable work: The New Spain, Nationalism and War in the Balkans
- Spouse(s): Jessie Helen Ilbert (m. 1904; d. 1946); Joan Bullock-Webster (m. 1948)
- Children: 4, including Sir George Young, 5th Baronet
- Relatives: Geoffrey Winthrop Young (brother); Edward Hilton Young, 1st Baron Kennet (brother)

Sir George Young, 4th Baronet (1872–1952) was a British diplomat, journalist and Ottoman scholar.

== Early life ==
Sir George Young, known as Georis, was born on 25 October 1872 He was the eldest son of Sir George Young, 3rd Baronet. His siblings were Geoffrey Winthrop Young, Edward Hilton Young and his sister Eacy Young, who died in her early teens.

Young attended Eton College but was expelled. He studied at universities in France, Germany, and Russia.

In 1906 he was admitted as a member of the Royal Victorian Order.

== Diplomatic service ==
Young entered the Diplomatic Service and by 1896 had been posted to Washington. After a period in Athens he was posted, in 1901, to the UK Embassy in Constantinople (Istanbul since 1930). Whilst working there he edited, with the assistance of an archivist and other officials, the Corps de droit ottoman. The work was aimed at "those engaged in administrative or diplomatic affairs, in legal or commercial business, and in literary or scientific research in the Ottoman Empire".

His assignment to the embassy in Madrid in 1904 marked the start of a long relationship with Spain, eventually leading to his involvement in the civil war and his 1933 book "The New Spain" which has been widely quoted. Other diplomatic postings also led to books which often reflected the political situation in the various nations, e.g. his publication of "Nationalism and War in the Balkans" (1914) a few years after his 1906 posting as chargé d'affaires in Belgrade and his publication "Portugal" (1917) after he was posted to Lisbon in 1914, as First Secretary. Whilst in Lisbon his was practically a lone voice against encouraging the involvement of Portugal in the First World War.

== War service, journalism, Germany and labour politics ==
He left the Diplomatic Service in 1915 and from 1915 to 1918, he served in an Admiralty Intelligence Unit. In 1918, he enlisted in the Honourable Artillery Company.

After the war he moved into journalism first becoming a correspondent for the Daily News in Berlin (1918–1919). His book "New Germany" was published in 1920, in it he wrote " in January, 1919, I resigned my commission and made my way out to Berlin as correspondent for the Daily News, I had two purposes in view. One was to find out to what extent we had really won the war-in the only way it could be won-by forcing the German people into revolution; and incidentally to take any opportunity that might offer of furthering that revolution."

In 1920 he travelled to Moscow for the Daily Herald, where he met the Labour Party delegation. He went on to join the Labour Party in 1915 and became a member of its advisory committee on international affairs. He stood as a Labour parliamentary candidate for South Bucks in the general elections of 1923 and 1924 but was unsuccessful on both occasions.

== Spain ==
By 1937 Young was living in a villa in Torremolinos which at that time was close to the southern front in the Spanish Civil War. He was a strong supporter of the Popular Front government which had been elected in 1936, and early in 1937 Young was involved in establishing the "University Ambulance Unit", with the intention that it would operate on similar lines to the Friends' Ambulance Unit in which his brother Geoffrey had served during the First World War. The stated aim was to "serve both sides" but it would "be based to begin with on Malaga where the need now is greater". The unit was to be based at Young's home in Torremolinos which had been converted into a hospital. From there the Unit could provide medical assistance and other humanitarian aid to the beleaguered citizens of Malaga and the surrounding area but the Nationalist victory in the Battle of Málaga, which led to the Málaga–Almería road massacre, meant that refugees became the focus of the Unit's work, first in Almeria and then in Murcia. He was also a member of the "International Committee for the Co-ordination of Assistance to Republican Spain" a group whose members were drawn from the Popular Front or had communist associations. He maintained a home in Torremolinos until the end of his life.

== Personal life ==
In 1904 Young married Jessie Helen (the daughter of Sir Courtenay Ilbert). They had two sons and two daughters. The eldest was Gerry Young. Jessie died in 1946, Young's second marriage, in 1948, was to Joan, daughter of Rev. Frank Bullock-Webster (who had been Chaplain to the embassy in Madrid until 1909).

Young died on 26 September 1952 at Sonning, Berkshire, England.

== Selected publications ==
- Corps de Droit Ottoman, 1904
- Nationalism and War in the Balkans, 1914
- Portugal, 1917
- New Germany, 1920
- Diplomacy, Old and New, 1921
- Constantinople, 1925
- Egypt, 1927
- Freedom of the Seas, 1928
- The Pendulum of Politics, 1930
- Tales of Trespass, 1932
- The New Spain, 1933
- Poor Fred, 1937
- Federalism and Freedom, 1942

== See also ==
- Young baronets of Formosa Place (1813)
