= George Albert Young =

Canadian geologist (1878–1947)

George Albert Young, FRSC (1878–1947) was a Canadian geologist who was Chief Geologist of the Canadian Geological Survey. He was President of the Royal Society of Canada in 1935–1936, in succession to fellow geologist Reginald Walter Brock, who died in a plane accident.
