= Robert Eyles Egerton =

Sir Robert Egerton KCSI CIE
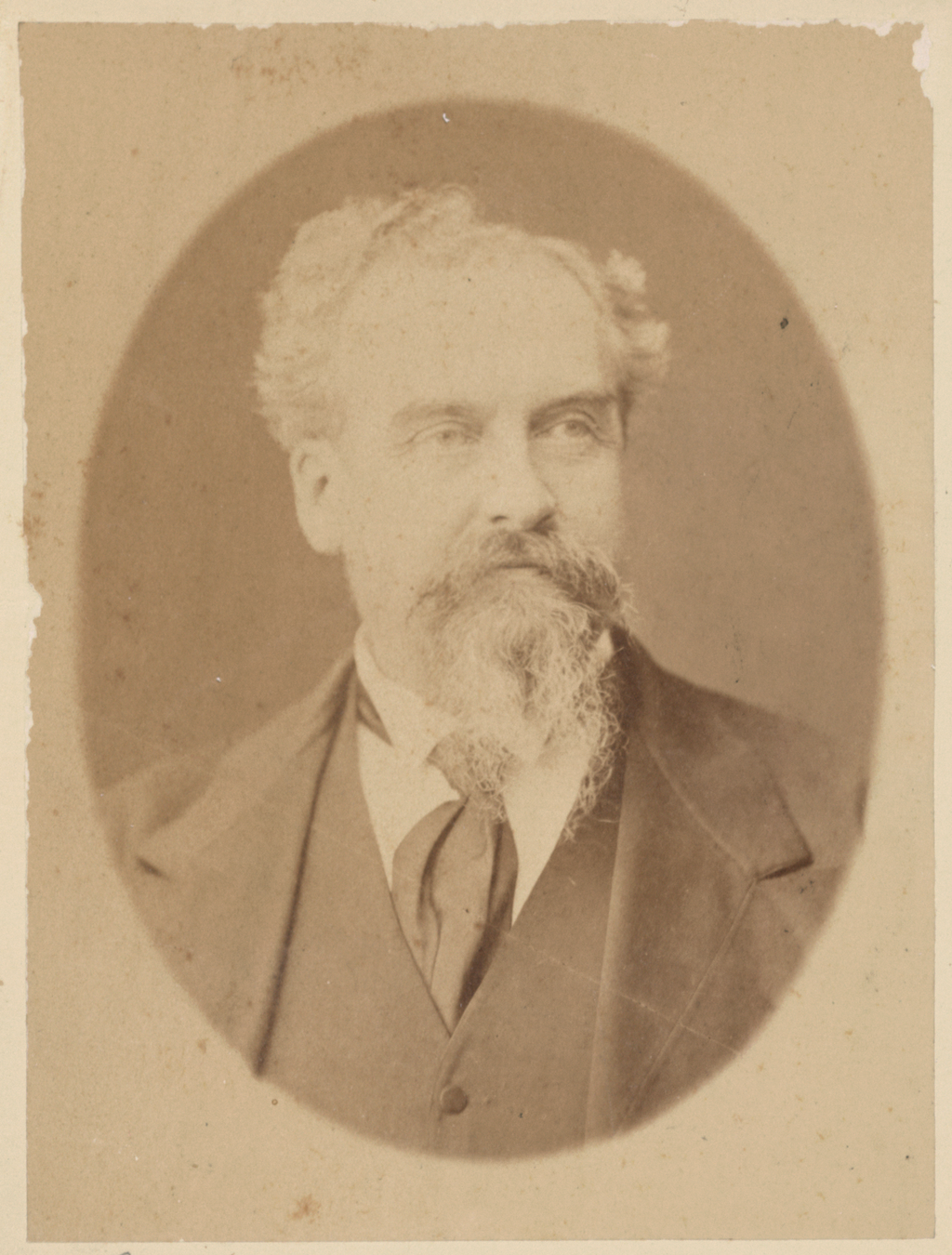

Lieutenant Governor of Punjab
- In office 2 April 1877 – 3 April 1882
- Governors General: The Earl of Lytton; The Marquess of Ripon
- Preceded by: Sir Henry Davies
- Succeeded by: Sir Charles Umpherston Aitchison

Personal details
- Born: 15 April 1827
- Died: 30 September 1912 (aged 85)
- Education: Exeter College, Oxford; East India Company College

Sir Robert Eyles Egerton KCSI CIE (15 April 1827 – 30 September 1912) was a British administrator in the Imperial Civil Service who served as a member of the Imperial Legislative Council and as Lieutenant Governor of the Punjab.

== Biography ==
He was born into the Egerton family, the youngest son of William Egerton. He was educated at Exeter College, Oxford, and the East India Company College.

He began his career in India in 1849. During the Indian Mutiny of 1857 he served as Deputy Commissioner at Lahore. In 1869 he was appointed Commissioner of Nagpur, and from 23-03-1868 to 01-04-1877 he was made Financial Commissioner of the Punjab. Between 1871 and 1874 he also served as a member of the Governor General's Imperial Legislative Council. In 1879 he was appointed Lieutenant Governor of the Punjab. Egerton retired from service at the end of his term in 1882.

Lord Lytton described Egerton as an administrator with 'loyalty and good sense' and 'a tower of strength to the Administration'.

== Personal life ==
On 18 April 1853 he married Mary Warren, with whom he had seven children. His daughter, Frances Mary Egerton, married Sir William Mackworth Young.
