= George Young (Royal Navy officer) =

Royal Navy Admiral (1732–1810)

Admiral Sir George Young FRS
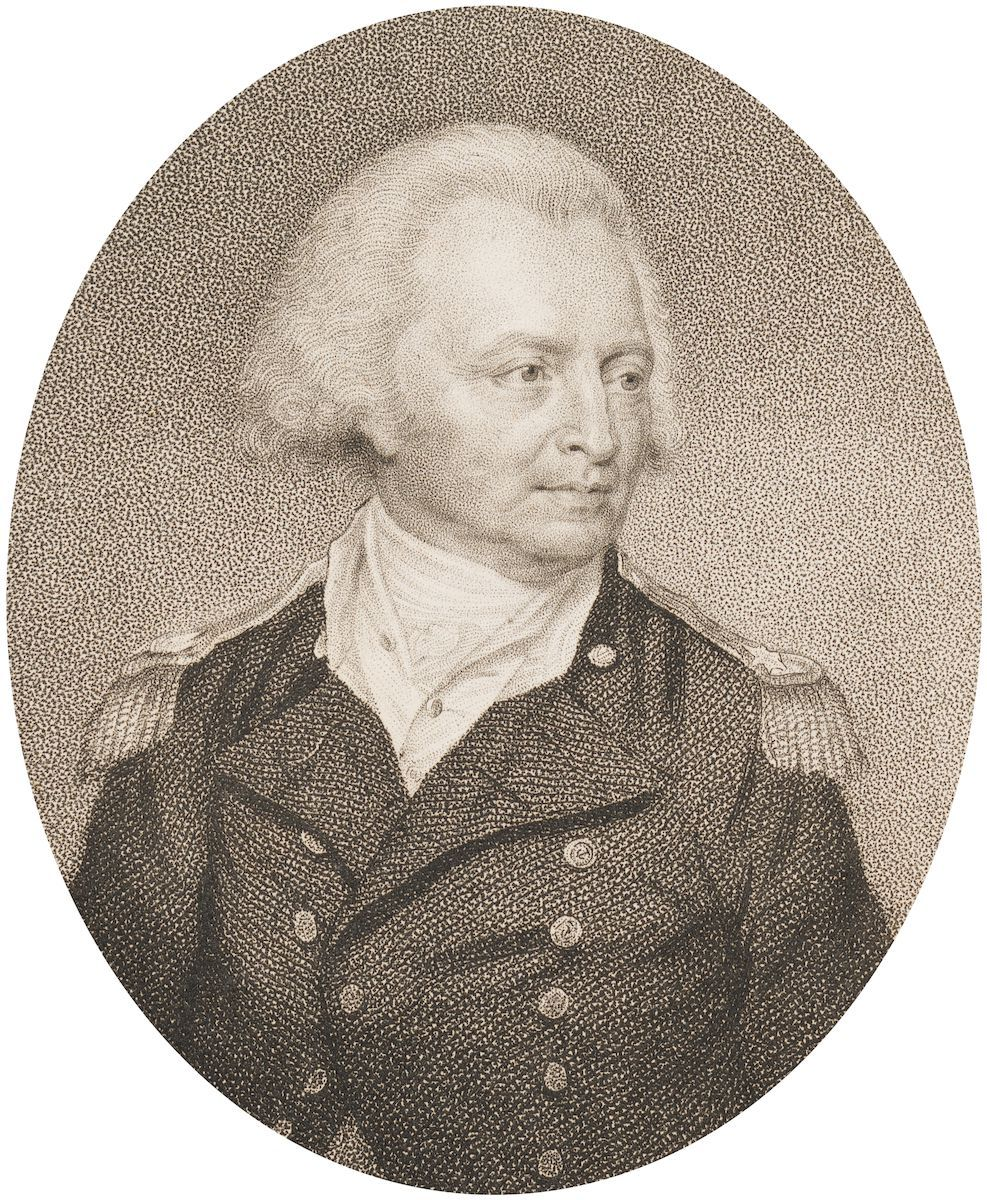
- Young in 1814 (engraving on paper)
- Born: 17 June 1732; Painswick, Gloucestershire
- Died: 28 June 1810 (aged 78); Formosa Place, Cookham, Berkshire
- Burial place: Cookham, Berkshire
- Military career
- Allegiance: United Kingdom
- Branch: Royal Navy; Bombay Marine
- Service years: 1746–1749 (Royal Navy); 1749–1756 (Bombay Marine); 1756–1810 (Royal Navy)
- Rank: Admiral
- Commands: HMS Ferret; HMS Weazel; HMS Alderney; HMS Vulture; HMS Cormorant; HMS Rippon; HMY William & Mary; HMY Katherine; HMS Zealous
- Conflicts: War of the Austrian Succession; Siege of Pondicherry; Seven Years' War; Siege of Louisbourg; Siege of Quebec; Siege of Havana; American Revolutionary War; Siege of Pondicherry; Russian Armament
- Awards: Knight bachelor

Admiral Sir George Young FRS (1732–1810) was a British Royal Navy officer who served through the second half of the eighteenth century. His portrait was painted by John Smart in 1805. An engraving on paper was made of him in 1814.

== Biography ==
Sir George Young was born on 17 June 1732 as the eldest son of Rev. George Young of Bere Regis in Dorset, and Eleanor Young.

He first went to sea at the age of fourteen in 1746, and a year later joined the East India Company's marine. In 1757 he was discharged, joined the Royal Navy, and soon reached the rank of Midshipman. He commanded a ship during the Siege of Louisbourg (1758), incapacitating two enemy ships; Bienfaisant, and Prudent. An oil painting of this night engagement was painted by Francis Swaine, based upon a sketch by George Young.

In 1759 he participated in the Battle of Quebec. In 1761 he was promoted to lieutenant of HMS Orford, with captain Mariot Arbuthnot. In this capacity he participated in the Siege of Havana under Sir George Pocock, and continued to be stationed in Jamaica until the end of the war.

He was promoted to commander on 29 Sept 1768, serving for some time on the West African station, where he was an explorer. He explored ancient burying places on the Canary Islands, obtaining a mummy which was brought to the library of Trinity College.

In 1776 he went out to the East Indies in command of HMS Cormorant, from which he was posted to HMS Rippon as flag captain to Sir Edward Vernon. In this post he was involved in the Siege of Pondicherry. Young was then sent home with despatches, and received the usual 500 shillings to buy a sword. He was appointed in March 1779 to HMY William & Mary, taking the Prince of Wales to the Nore when the king visited the fleet under Sir Hyde Parker.

In 1781 Young was knighted. After this he moved to the Catherine yacht, and then in the fleet of 1791 commanded HMS Zealous. In 1794 he was promoted to rear-admiral, vice-admiral on 1799, and to admiral of the white in 1804. During this time he saw no action.

In 1784 Young (in conjunction with Lord Mansfield, Sir Joseph Banks, Thomas Rowcroft, James Matra, and others) successfully lobbied Pitt the Younger for the establishment of a colony in New South Wales. He wrote a paper containing a plan for this proposal, which was communicated to Lord Sydney by the Attorney-General Sir Pepper Arden in 1785. This then became the basis of the official scheme on which the expedition of Governor Arthur Phillip was put in place. Historical sources claim that the value of Young's paper was in its practical details. A reprint of this paper in a much shortened form, was in 1888 reproduced in facsimile at Sydney. In 1788 Young together with his connection John Call, applied to the colonial office for a grant of Norfolk Island, which had, however, been just taken up for settlement. In 1791 he was a promoter and one of the first proprietors of the Sierra Leone Company.

He was a prominent abolitionist and was opposed to the Royal Navy practice of using sailors of African descent to make good a shortfall in crew numbers In 1792 he was examined before the bar of the House of Commons on the African slave trade, giving evidence on its evils; testimony which was valued for its temperate delivery. He served ten years as treasurer of the Thames Navigation Commission.

His second wife had land holdings at Cookham in Berkshire, after marrying her they added to those holdings and in the mid-1780s Formosa Place was built there. Young died at Formosa Place, Berkshire, on 28 June 1810 and was buried at Holy Trinity, Cookham. He was a member of the Royal Society, and the Society of Antiquaries, and regarded for his skills as a vocalist and amateur musician. His entry in the Dictionary of National Biography written by John Knox Laughton, describes him as 'remarkably handsome', a description apparently confirmed by his portraits.

=== Family ===
His first wife was Elizabeth, daughter of a distiller in Great Marlow; with whom he had two daughters and two sons. His elder son, Samuel, was created a baronet in November 1813. His younger son was George Forbes Freeman Young (1770 - 1799). Elizabeth died in February 1779, later that same year he married his second wife, Anne, daughter of Dr William Battie. An 1825 Royal Navy biography reports that he was the Uncle of Edward “Ned” young who was one of the mutineers on the mutiny on the bounty.

Through his eldest son, he is an ancestor of the former Conservative Whip and life peer George Young, Baron Young of Cookham.

== Legacy ==
The Youngs River and Youngs Bay, which flow into the Columbia River at Astoria, Oregon were named for him by his nephew Lt. William Robert Broughton of the Royal Navy.
