= List of governors of Punjab (British India) =

Governor of Punjab
- Emblem of The Province of Punjab

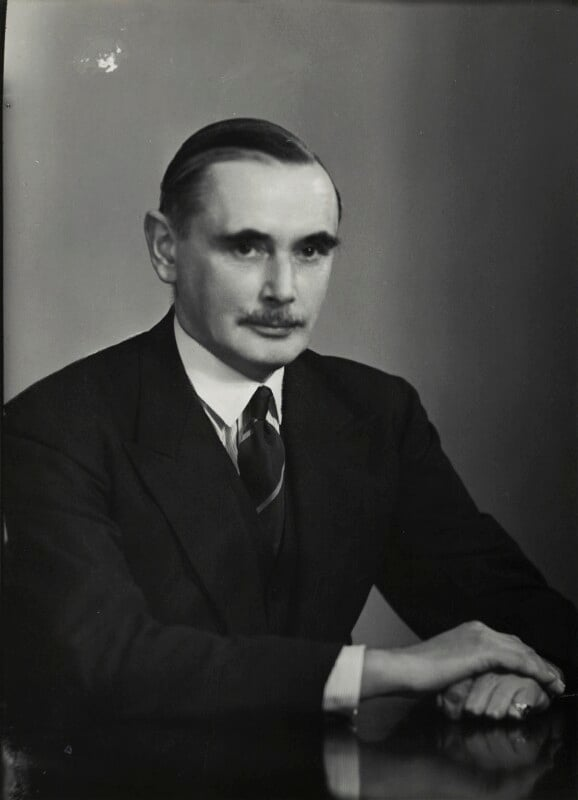
- Last holder Evan Meredith Jenkins; 8 April 1946 – 15 August 1947
- Government of Punjab
- Status: Head of government
- Member of: Legislative Council
- Appointer: Monarch of the United Kingdom (1849–1876); Emperor of India (1876–1947)
- Term length: Five years
- Inaugural holder: Henry Lawrence
- Formation: 1 April 1849
- Final holder: Evan Meredith Jenkins
- Abolished: 15 August 1947

The governor of the Punjab was head of the British administration in the province of the Punjab. In 1849 the East India Company defeated the Sikh Empire and annexed the Punjab region. The governor-general of India, Lord Dalhousie, implemented a three-member Board of Administration to govern the province. The Board of Administration was abolished in 1853 and replaced by the office of chief commissioner. Following the liquidation of the East India Company and the transfer of its assets to the British Crown, the office of lieutenant-governor was instituted in 1859. This lasted until it was replaced by the office of governor in the aftermath of the Montagu–Chelmsford Reforms.

In 1947, the British Raj came to an end and India was partitioned and Pakistan was created. The Punjab was partitioned into West Punjab and East Punjab, with the former joining Pakistan and the latter India. In Pakistan, the first governor of West Punjab was Sir Francis Mudie. In 1955, West Punjab was dissolved, and became Punjab province. In 1966, East Punjab was divided into the present-day Indian states of Haryana, Himachal Pradesh and Punjab.

== List of heads of the Punjab (1849–1947) ==
No.	Portrait	Name (birth–death)	Took office	Left office	Notes
President of the Board of Administration
1		Sir Henry Montgomery Lawrence (1806–1857)	1 April 1849	17 January 1853	Assisted by John Lawrence and Charles Grenville Mansel; Creation of the Punjab Irregular Force
Chief Commissioners
1		John Laird Mair Lawrence (1811–1879)	18 January 1853	31 December 1858	Creation of the Punjab Railway; Indian Mutiny of 1857; Government of India Act 1858
Lieutenant-Governors
1		Sir John Laird Mair Lawrence, Bt (1811–1879)	1 January 1859	25 February 1859	Delhi transferred from the North-Western Provinces to the Punjab
2		Sir Robert Montgomery (1809–1887)	25 February 1859	10 January 1865	Upper Doab famine of 1860–61; Establishment of Lawrence College, Murree, King Edward Medical University, Government College University, Lahore, Glancy Medical College and Forman Christian College; Founding of the town of Montgomery
3		Sir Donald Friell McLeod (1810–1872)	10 January 1865	1 June 1870	Establishment of the Lahore Museum; Punjab Murderous Outrages Act 1867
4		Sir Henry Marion Durand (1812–1871)	1 June 1870	20 January 1871	
5		Sir Robert Henry Davies (1824–1902)	20 January 1871	2 April 1877	Murree made summer capital in 1873; Singh Sabha Movement; Establishment of the Mayo School of Industrial Arts; Opening of Lahore Zoo; Simla made summer capital in 1876; Delhi Durbar of 1877
6		Sir Robert Eyles Egerton (1827–1912)	2 April 1877	3 April 1882	
7		Sir Charles Umpherston Aitchinson (1832–1896)	3 April 1882	2 April 1887	Commencement of the Sidhnai and Sohag Para Colonies; Establishment of Aitchison College, University of the Punjab and University of Veterinary and Animal Sciences; Creation of the Lahore Bar Association; Opening of the Punjab Public Library
8		Sir James Broadwood Lyall (1838–1916)	2 April 1887	5 March 1892	Commencement of the Chenab Colony; Founding of Lyallpur; Ahmadiyya movement
9		Sir Dennis Fitzpatrick (1837–1920)	5 March 1892	6 March 1897	Commencement of the Chunian Colony; Establishment of Khalsa College, Amritsar and School of Medicine for Christian Women
10		Sir William Mackworth Young (1840–1924)	6 March 1897	6 March 1902	Punjab Land Alienation Act, 1900; Frontier districts transferred to newly created North-West Frontier Province; Commencement of the Jhelum Colony
11		Sir Charles Montgomery Rivaz (1845–1926)	6 March 1902	6 March 1907	Delhi Durbar of 1903; Founding of Sargodha; Establishment of the Punjab Agricultural College and Research Institute; Colonisation Bill, 1906; 1907 Punjab unrest
12		Sir Denzil Charles Jelf Ibbetson (1847–1908)	6 March 1907	26 May 1907	
–		Thomas Gordon Walker (1849–1917)	26 May 1907	12 August 1907	Acting Lieutenant-Governor
12		Sir Denzil Charles Jelf Ibbetson (1847–1908)	12 August 1907	22 January 1908	Creation of the Punjab Muslim League
–		Thomas Gordon Walker (1849–1917)	22 January 1908	25 May 1908	Acting Lieutenant-Governor
13		Sir Louis William Dane (1856–1946)	25 May 1908	28 April 1911	Anand Marriage Act, 1909
–		James McCrone Douie (1854–1935)	28 April 1911	4 August 1911	Acting Lieutenant-Governor
13		Sir Louis William Dane (1856–1946)	4 August 1911	26 May 1913	Delhi Durbar of 1911; Delhi transferred from the Punjab and designated the capital of British India; Establishment of Kinnaird College for Women; Colonisation of Government Lands Act, 1912
14		Sir Michael Francis O'Dwyer (1864–1940)	26 May 1913	26 May 1919	First World War; Commencement of the Lower Bari Doab, Upper Chenab, Upper Jhelum, Nili Bar Colonies; Lahore Conspiracy Case trial; Government of India Act 1919; Rowlatt Act; Jallianwala Bagh massacre
15		Sir Edward Douglas Maclagan (1864–1952)	26 May 1919	3 January 1921	Akali movement
Governors
1		Sir Edward Douglas Maclagan (1864–1952)	3 January 1921	31 May 1924	Nankana massacre; Creation of the Unionist Party; Establishment of Maclagan Engineering College and Lahore College for Women University; Members of Executive Council: John Maynard (Finance), Sundar Singh Majithia (Revenue); Ministers: Fazl-i-Hussain (Education, Health and Local government), Lala Harkishan Lal (Agriculture)
2		Sir William Malcolm Hailey (1872–1969)	31 May 1924	9 August 1928	Ministers: Manohar Lal (Education) (1927–1930), Joginder Singh (Agriculture) (1927–1930), Feroz Khan Noon (Local Self-government) (1927–1930)
3		Sir Geoffrey Fitzhervey de Montmorency (1876–1955)	9 August 1928	19 July 1932	Birth of Lollywood; Execution of Bhagat Singh; Khaksar movement
–		Sikandar Hayat Khan (1892–1942)	19 July 1932	19 October 1932	Acting Governor
3		Sir Geoffrey Fitzhervey de Montmorency (1876–1955)	19 October 1932	12 April 1933	
4		Sir Herbert William Emerson (1881–1962)	12 April 1933	1 February 1934	
–		Sir Sikandar Hayat Khan (1892–1942)	15 February 1934	9 June 1934	Acting Governor
4		Sir Herbert William Emerson (1881–1962)	9 June 1934	4 April 1938	Government of India Act 1935; 1937 Indian provincial elections
5		Sir Henry Duffield Craik, Bt (1876–1955)	4 April 1938	7 April 1941	Lahore Resolution
6		Sir Bertrand James Glancy (1882–1953)	7 April 1941	8 April 1946	Simla Conference; 1946 Indian provincial elections
7		Sir Evan Meredith Jenkins (1896–1985)	8 April 1946	15 August 1947	Partition of India

== See also ==
- Governor of Punjab, Pakistan
- List of governors of Punjab (India)
- List of governors-general of India
