= George B. Young =

American judge

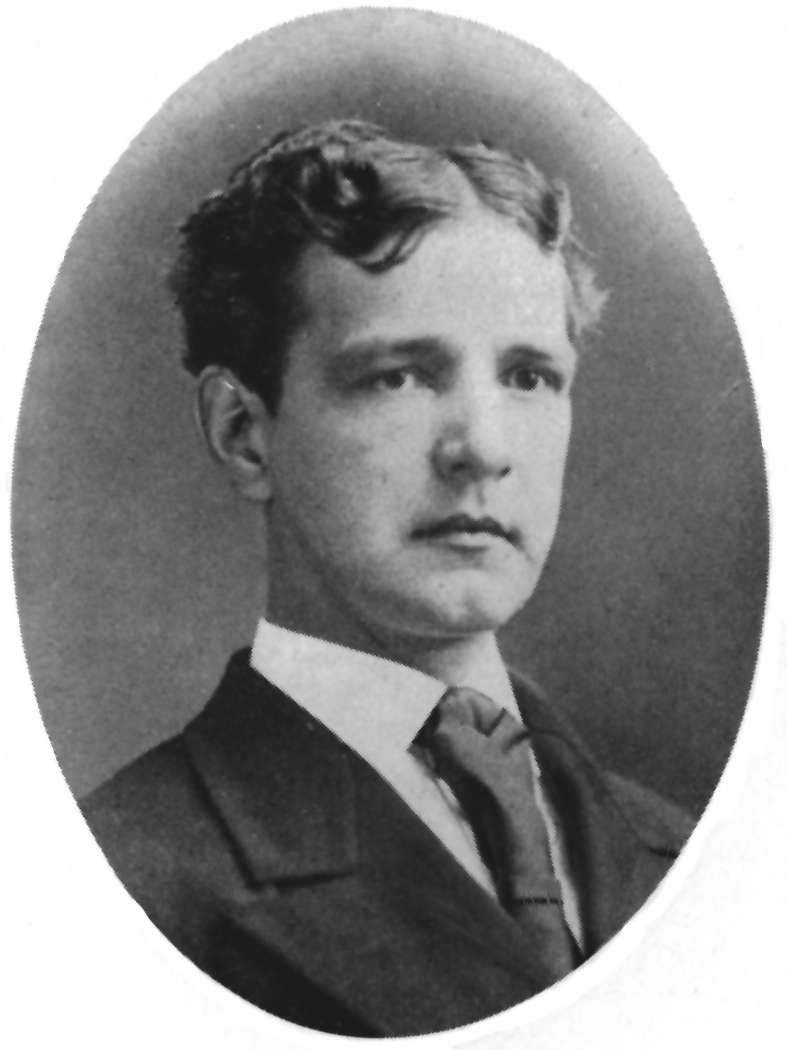
George Brooks Young

George Brooks Young (July 24, 1840 – December 30, 1906) was an American jurist and lawyer.

Born in Boston, Massachusetts, Young graduated from Harvard Law School in 1863. He studied law in the office of Henry Austin Scudder. He was admitted to the New York bar, in New York City, in 1864. In 1870, Young moved to Saint Paul, Minnesota and continued to practice law. In 1874 and 1875, Young served on the Minnesota Supreme Court. Then from 1875 to 1892, Young served as the Minnesota Supreme Court Reporter. Young then continued to practice law. He died in Saint Paul, Minnesota.
