= Geoffrey Winthrop Young =

British climber, poet and educator (1876–1958)

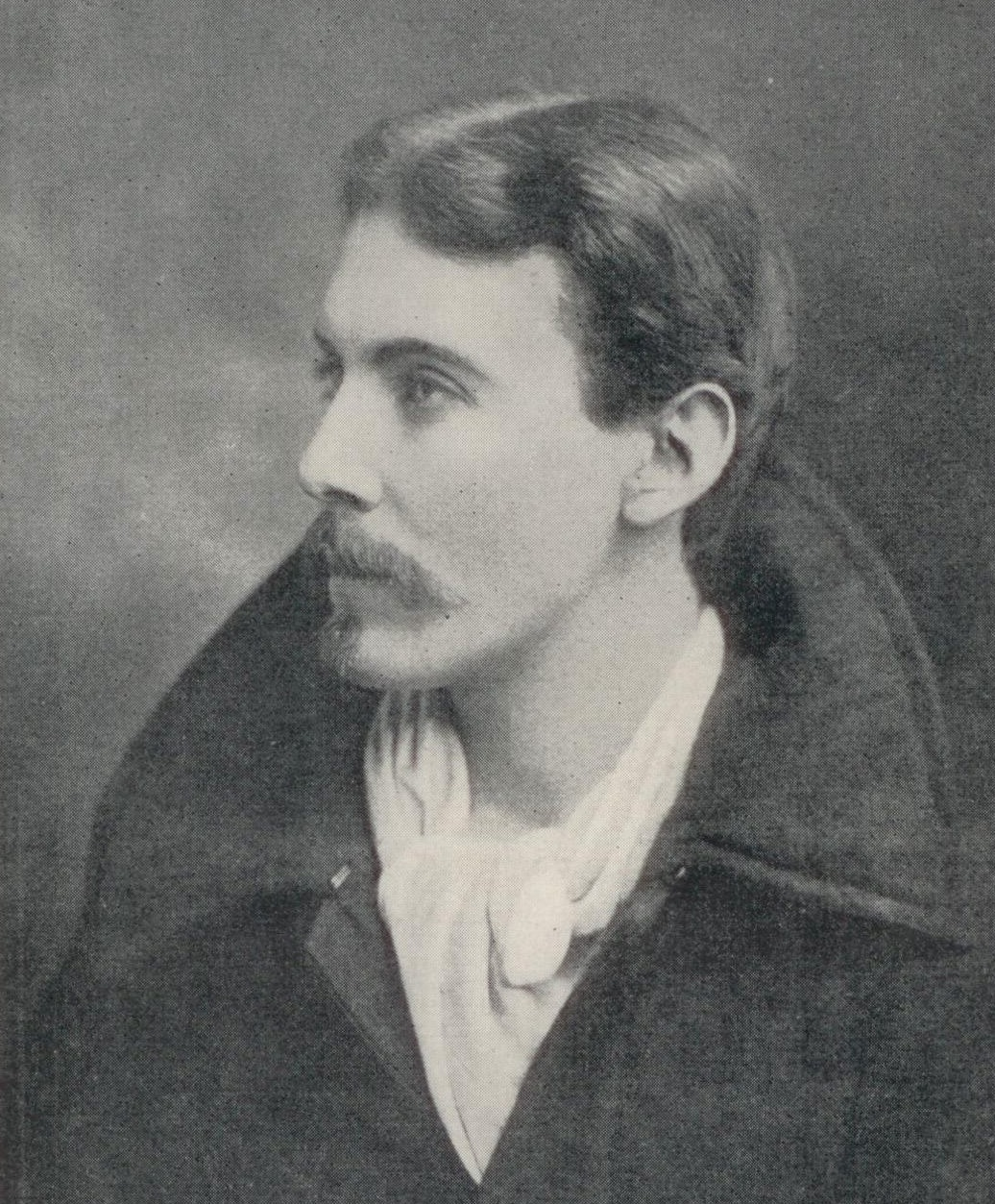
- Young in 1898
- Born: 25 October 1876; Kensington, London, England
- Died: 8 September 1958 (aged 81)
- Education: Marlborough College
- Alma mater: Trinity College, Cambridge (1895-98)
- Occupation: Author
- Known for: Mountaineering
- Spouse: Eleanor Slingsby (m. 1918)
- Parents: Sir George Young, 3rd Baronet (father); Alice Eacy Kennedy (mother)
- Relatives: Sir George Young, 4th Baronet (brother), Edward Hilton Young (brother); Jocelin Winthrop Young (son)

Geoffrey Winthrop Young (25 October 1876 – 8 September 1958) was a British climber, poet and educator, and author of several notable books on mountaineering.

Young was born in Kensington, the middle son of Sir George Young, 3rd Baronet, a noted classicist and charity commissioner, of Formosa Place at Cookham in Berkshire, where he grew up. His mother, formerly Alice Eacy Kennedy, was the daughter of Dr Evory Kennedy of Belgard Co. Dublin and had previously lived in India as Lady Lawrence, wife of Sir Alexander Lawrence, Bt, nephew to the Viceroy, Lord Lawrence. Widowed when Sir Alexander died in a bridge collapse, Alice returned to England, marrying Sir George in 1871. Winthrop's brother Edward Hilton Young became the 1st Baron Kennet.

== Mountaineering ==
Educated at Marlborough, Young began rock climbing shortly before his first term at Trinity College, Cambridge, where he studied Classics and won the Chancellor's Medal for English Verse two years running. While there, Young wrote a humorous college climbing guide called The Roof-Climber's Guide to Trinity, in part a parody of early alpine guidebooks, in part a useful reference work for those, like him, who were keen to clamber up Cambridge's highest spires. During his time as a student at Cambridge he developed a close life-long friendship with G. M. Trevelyan who was a contemporary at Trinity College.

During the Edwardian Period, and up until the outbreak of hostilities heralding World War I, Young made several new and difficult ascents in the Alps, including noted routes on the Zermatt Breithorn on Monte Rosa (the "Younggrat"), the west ridge of the Gspaltenhorn, on the west face of the Weisshorn, and a dangerous and rarely repeated route on the south face of the Täschhorn. His finest rock climb was the Mer de Glace face of the Aiguille du Grépon. In 1911, with H. O. Jones, he ascended the Brouillard ridge of Mont Blanc and made the first complete traverse of the west ridge of the Grandes Jorasses, and the first descent of the ridge to the Col des Hirondelles. His favoured, but not only, guide was Josef Knubel of St Niklaus.

Winthrop Young also put up new routes on the crags of Northumberland the Lake District and Wales. He was elected president of the Climbers' Club in 1913, and he organised the Pen-y-Pass gatherings that propelled the advancement of rock climbing and included such technical luminaries as J. M. Archer Thompson, George Leigh Mallory, Siegfried Herford, John Percy Farrar and Oscar Eckenstein. These parties, beginning in earnest about 1907, and sometimes reaching sixty men, women and children, flooded the hotel and overflowed into Eckenstein's miner's cabin and various tents. They came to an end in 1914.

== World War I and injury ==
During the war, Young was at first a correspondent for the liberal Daily News, but later, as a conscientious objector, was active in the FAU, the Friends' Ambulance Unit. Sent to Italy he drove ambulances sometimes in the thick of battle, and as such he received several decorations. On 31 August 1917 on the Isonzo Front during the fight for Monte San Gabriele, an explosion caused injuries requiring the amputation of one of his legs. After the amputation, Young walked sixteen miles in two days to avoid being captured by the Austrians. He continued alpine climbing for a number of years – using a specially designed artificial leg that accepted a number of attachments for snow and rock work – and climbed the Matterhorn in 1928.

At the conclusion of the war in 1918 he married Eleanor Winthrop Young (née Slingsby), who helped him return to climbing after his amputation and often accompanied him on expeditions. Their son Jocelin was born on 25 October 1919, they moved to Cambridge at the end of 1924 and a daughter named Marcia was born on 11 March 1925, she went on to marry Peter Newbolt, the grandson of Sir Henry John Newbolt. Jocelin became a Royal Navy officer and an educator, he founded the Round Square association of schools and was private tutor to Constantine II of Greece. The biography written by Alan Hankinson mentions Winthrop Young's bisexuality.

== Outdoor educator and administrator ==
In 1920 Young published the 300-page manual of mountaineering instruction entitled Mountain Craft, to which Eckenstein and J. Norman Collie also contributed. The editor of the Alpine Club, John Percy Farrar, wrote to Young on the book's publication, saying: 'The book is magnificent ... It will be standard for so long as mankind is interested in mountaineering. The profound amount of work put into it staggers me.'

Young was a member of the Fell & Rock Climbing Club and in 1924, gave a dedication speech to mark the unveiling of a commemorative plaque on the Great Gable summit. The plaque memorialised members of the club who died in WW1, and named the club members who donated 3000 acres of fells land to the National Trust.

To support himself and his family he worked for the Rockefeller Foundation, and spent much time in Germany, and – having met Kurt Hahn before the War – helped Hahn immigrate to England in 1934. Much of what may be called an outdoor adventure education springs from this connection. The now famous Duke of Edinburgh Award scheme and the International Award scheme comes from this co-operation between Hahn and Young. The Outward Bound movement, after World War II, owes a considerable debt to their friendship.

During World War II, Young was president of the Alpine Club and it was through his efforts that the British Mountaineering Council, the umbrella organisation for climbers in Great Britain, was created in 1945.

== Books by G. W. Young ==
- The Roof-Climber's Guide to Trinity (1899)
- Wall and Roof Climbing (1905)
- Freedom. Poems (1914)
- From the Trenches: Louvain to the Aisne, the First Record of an Eye-Witness (1914)
- Mountain Craft (1920)
- On High Hills: Memories of the Alps (1927)
- Collected Poems (1936)
- Mountains with a Difference (1951)
- The Grace of Forgetting (1953)
- Snowdon Biography with Sutton & Noyce (1957)
