= Mackworth Young =

Member of the Indian Civil Service, Lieutenant-Governor of the Punjab

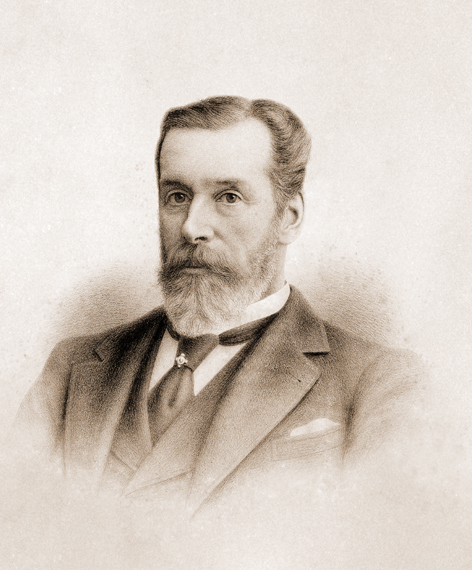
Former Governor of Punjab

Sir William Mackworth Young KCSI (15 August 1840 – 10 May 1924) was a member of the Indian Civil Service, who became Lieutenant-Governor of the Punjab 1897–1902.

== Early life ==
Young was the son of Captain Sir George Young, 2nd Baronet. He attended Eton and King's College, Cambridge, receiving a Bachelor of Arts degree in 1863 and a master of arts in 1866. Young joined the I.C.S. in Bengal in 1863, subsequently holding the title of Financial Commissioner of the Punjab from 1889 to 1895, Resident at Mysore (1895 to 1897) and Lieutenant Governor of the Punjab 1897–1902. He stepped down in early March 1902, and left Bombay for the United Kingdom on 8 March 1902. He also briefly served as a vice-chancellor of University of the Punjab.

Young also served as a member of the Imperial Legislative Council in 1893.

== Family ==
Young married, firstly, in 1869, Isabel Maria Elliott, daughter of the Rev. Charles Boileau Elliott. She died in 1870, two weeks after giving birth to their daughter, Isabel Mary Young.

He married, secondly, in 1881, Frances Mary Egerton, daughter of Sir Robert Eyles Egerton, Lieutenant-Governor of the Punjab. They had four sons, all of whom entered government service and achieved high office:

- Gerard Mackworth-Young, CIE (1884–1965), member of the Indian Civil Service and director of the British School at Athens;
- Sir Hubert Winthrop Young, KCMG, DSO (1885–1960), Governor of Nyasaland, Northern Rhodesia, and Trinidad and Tobago;
- Sir Mark Aitchison Young, GCMG (1886–1974), Governor of Barbados, Tanganyika, and Hong Kong;
- Norman Egerton Young, CB, CMG, MC (1892–1964), Secretary and Comptroller-General of the National Debt Office.

Government offices
Preceded by Sir Dennis Fitzpatrick	Lieutenant-Governor of the Punjab; 1897–1902	Succeeded by Sir Charles Montgomery Rivaz
