= Young baronets =

Set index for Young baronets

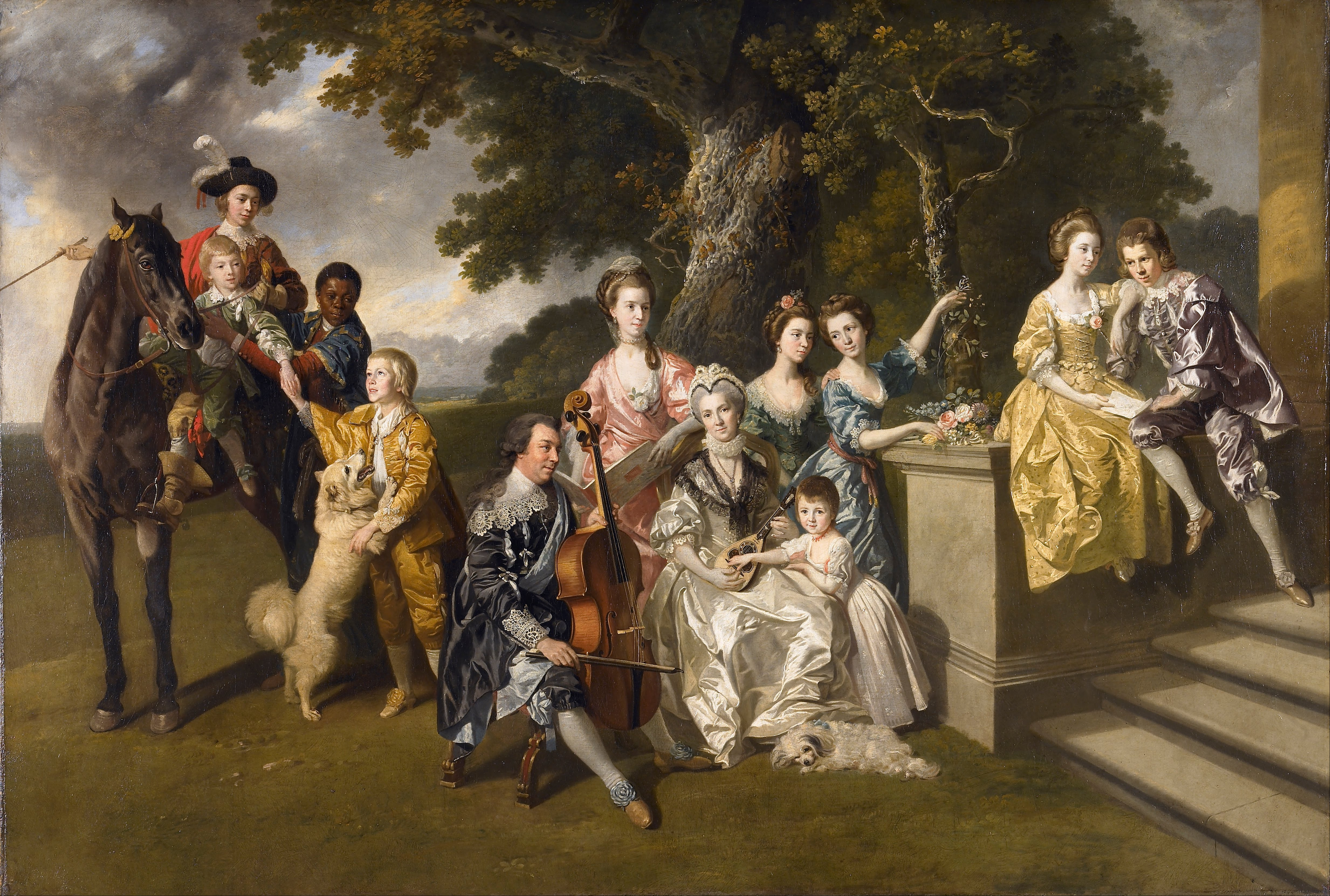
A c. 1767 portrait of Sir William Young, 1st Baronet, of North Dean and his family by Johan Zoffany

There have been five baronetcies created for persons with the surname Young, one in the Baronetage of England, one in the Baronetage of Great Britain and three in the Baronetage of the United Kingdom. As of 2026, four of the creations are extant.

- Young baronets of London (1628): see Sir Richard Young, 1st Baronet
- Young baronets of Dominica (1769)
- Young baronets of Formosa Place (1813)
- Young baronets of Bailieborough Castle (1821)
- Young baronets of Partick (1945)

== See also ==
- Baron Kennet
