= Emily Young =

English sculptor, born 1951

- Born: 1951 (age 74–75); London, England
- Occupation: Sculptor
- Parent(s): Wayland Young, 2nd Baron Kennet and Elizabeth Young
- Relatives: Hilton Young, 1st Baron Kennet (grandfather); Kathleen Scott (grandmother); Louisa Young (sister)
- Website: emilyyoung.com

Emily Young FRBS (born 1951) is a British sculptor, who has been called "Britain's greatest living stone sculptor". She was born in London into a family of artists, writers and politicians. She currently divides her time between studios in London and Italy.

== Biography ==
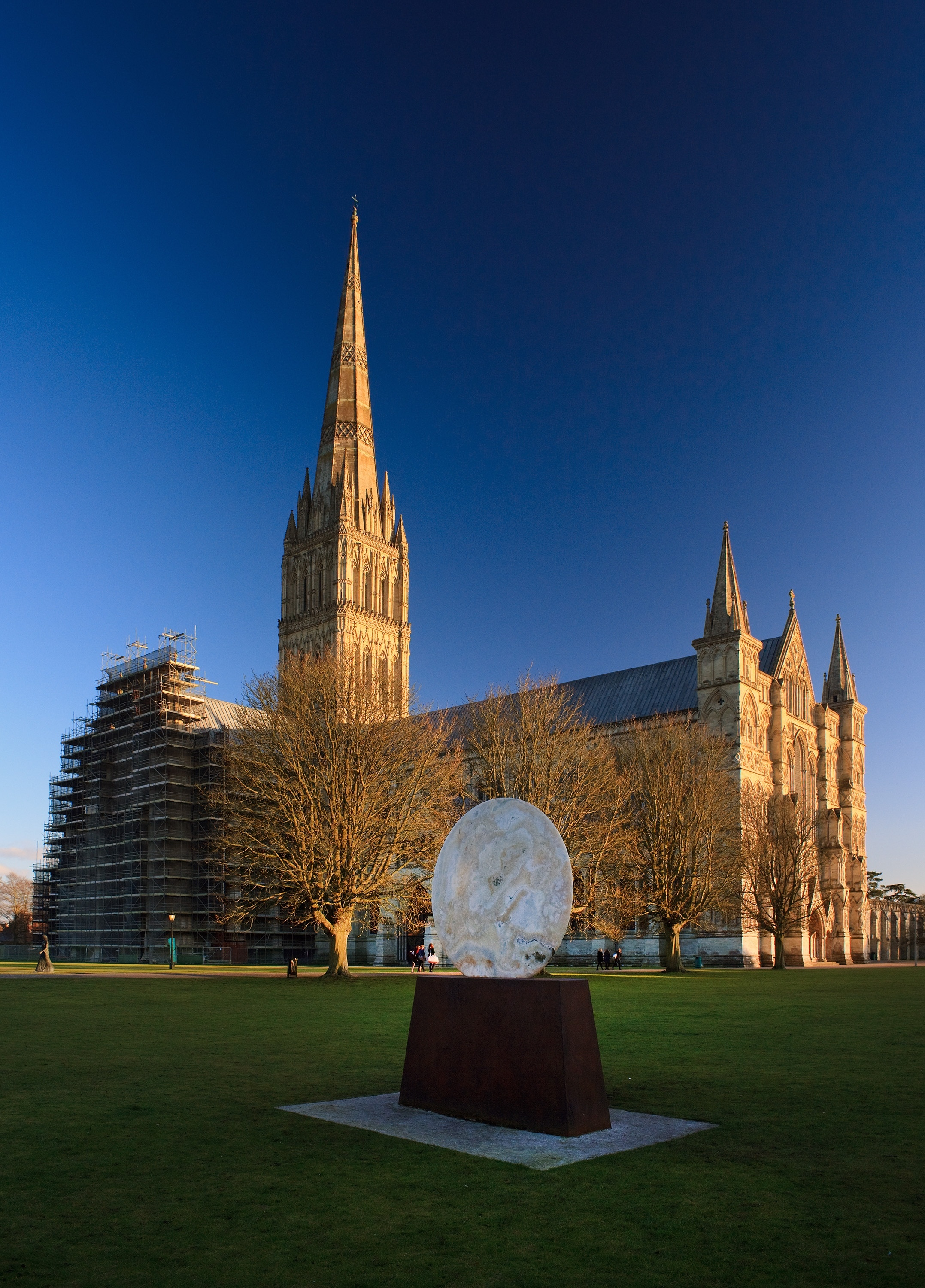
Lunar Disc I, at Salisbury Cathedral, England

Her mother was the writer and commentator Elizabeth Young, her father, Wayland Young, 2nd Baron Kennet, a politician, conservationist and writer. Emily Young's paternal grandparents were the politician and writer Hilton Young, 1st Baron Kennet, and the sculptor Kathleen Scott, the widow of the polar explorer Robert Falcon Scott. Her uncle was the ornithologist, conservationist and painter, Sir Peter Scott, who founded the Wildfowl & Wetlands Trust.

Emily Young received her secondary education at Putney High School, Holland Park School, Friends School Saffron Walden and the King Alfred School, London. First interested in painting, she spent her youth in London, Wiltshire and Italy, before she attended the Chelsea School of Art for one term in 1968 and also studied at Saint Martin's School of Art. In the late 1960s and 1970s, she travelled widely, visiting Afghanistan, Pakistan, India, France and Italy, Africa and the Middle East.

While at Holland Park School in 1966, she became a regular at the nearby London Free School night sessions in the Notting Hill area, which brought her into contact with many in the UK Underground. She may have been the inspiration for the song "See Emily Play", written by Pink Floyd's Syd Barrett.

During the 1970s and 1980s, she lived and worked with Simon Jeffes, leader of the Penguin Cafe Orchestra, and had one son, Arthur, born in 1978.

=== Work ===
Young's sculpture is held in many public as well as private collections. Some of her permanent installations can be seen in St Paul's Churchyard and Salisbury Cathedral. Young's Lunar Disc 1 was installed at Loyola University Chicago in 2011.

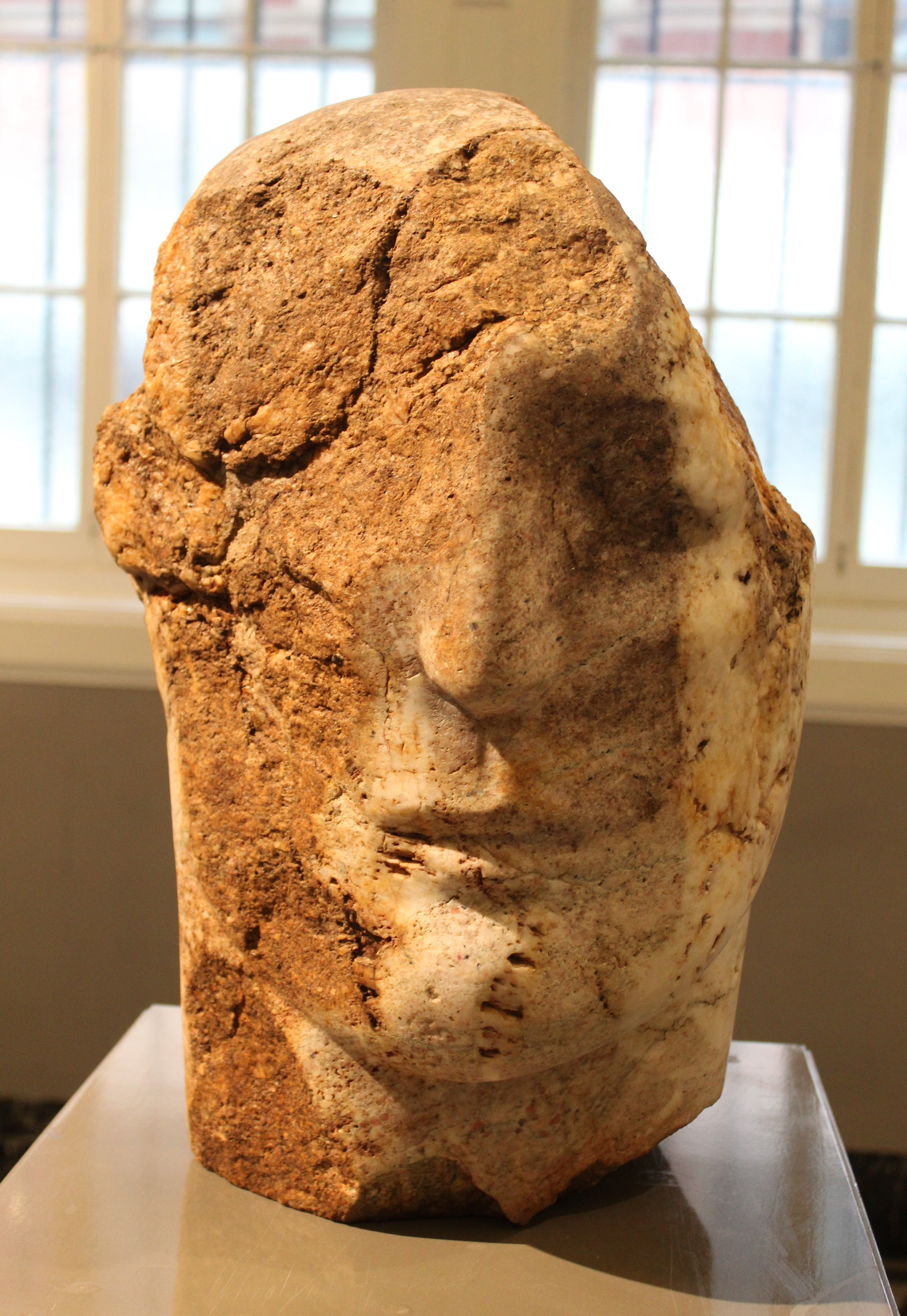
Warrior Poet, (2011), Victoria and Albert Museum, London

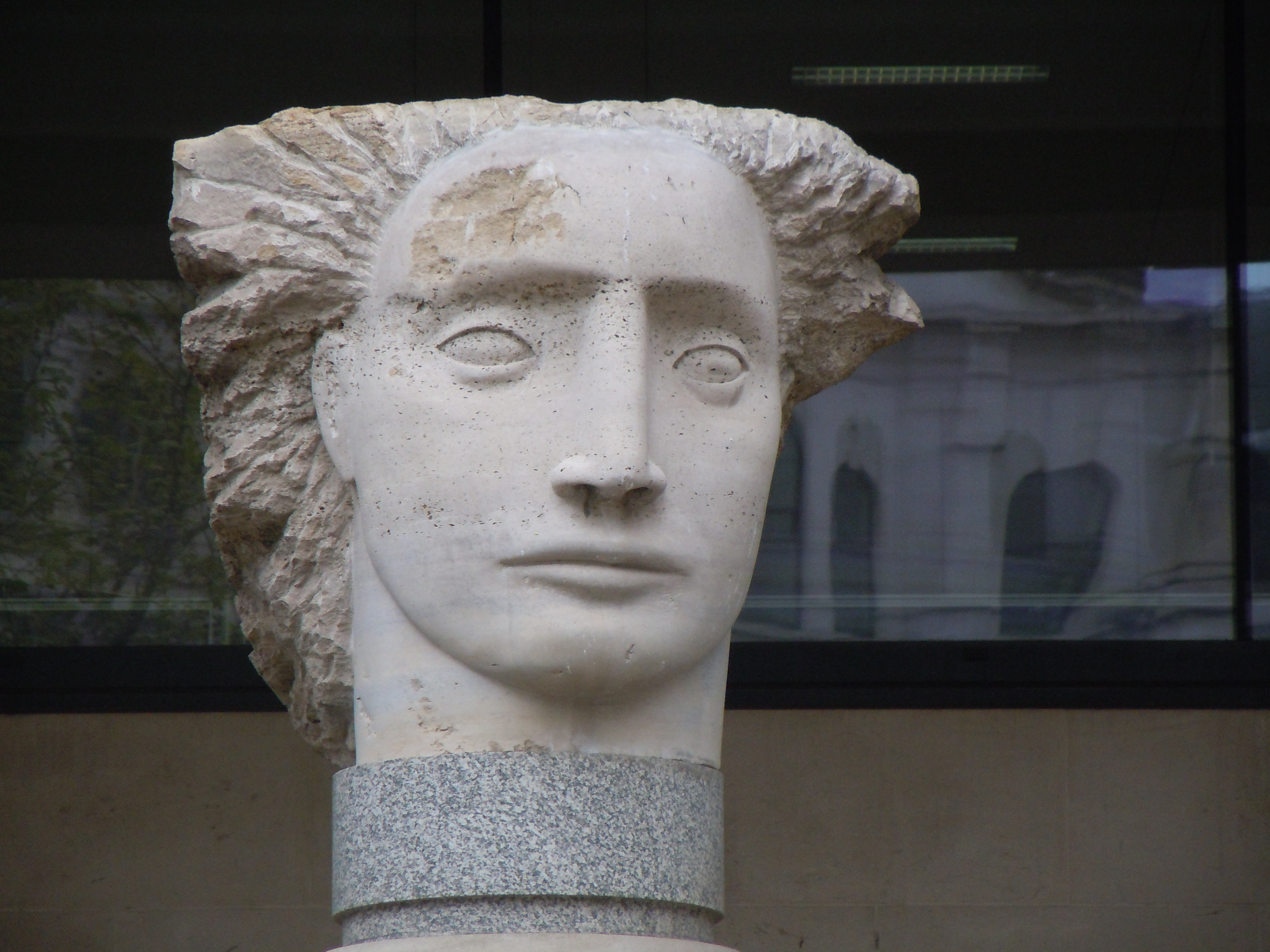
Angel I to IV, Paternoster Square, London

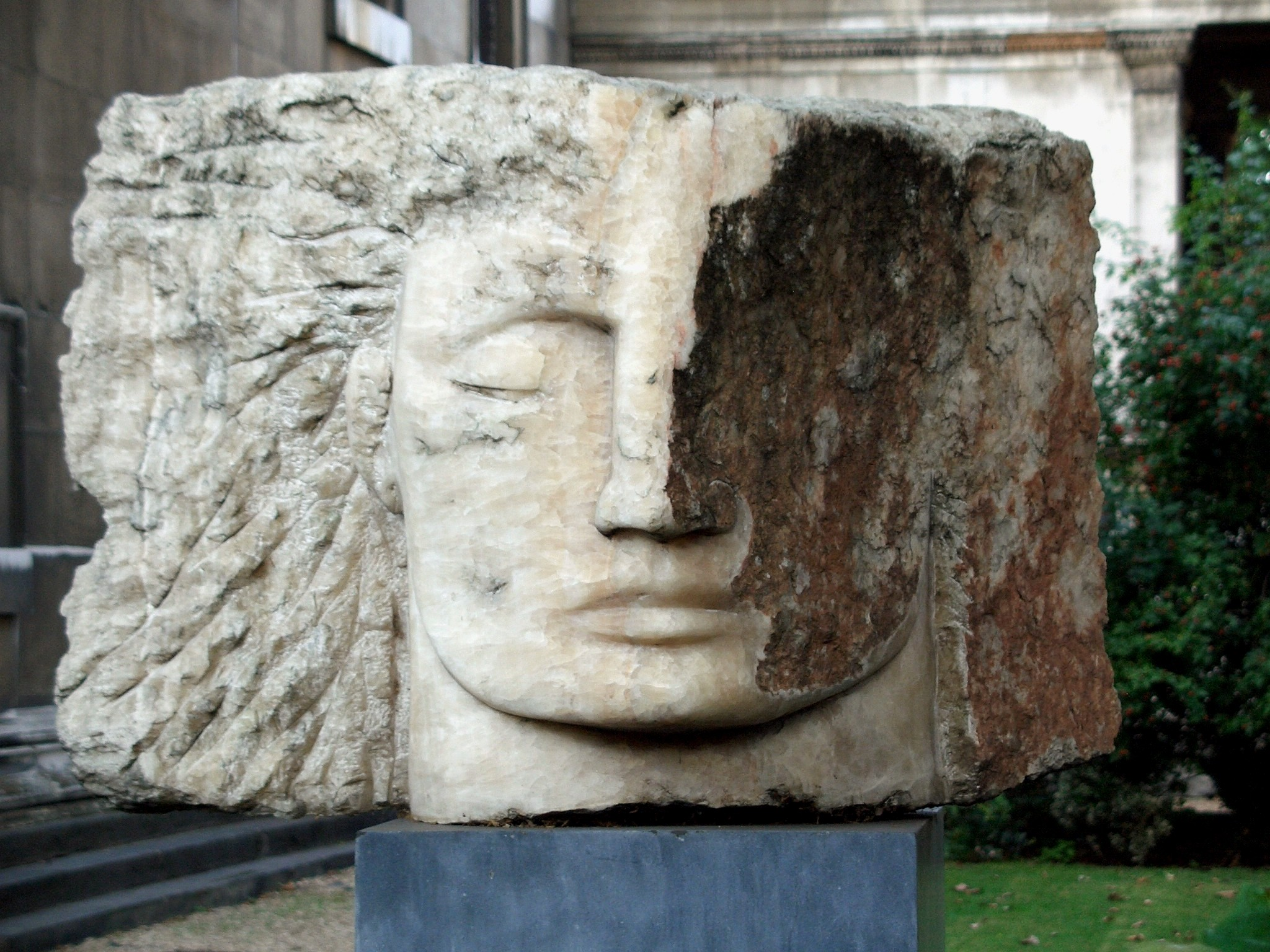
Archangel Michael, St Pancras New Church, London
