= Environment Triptych =

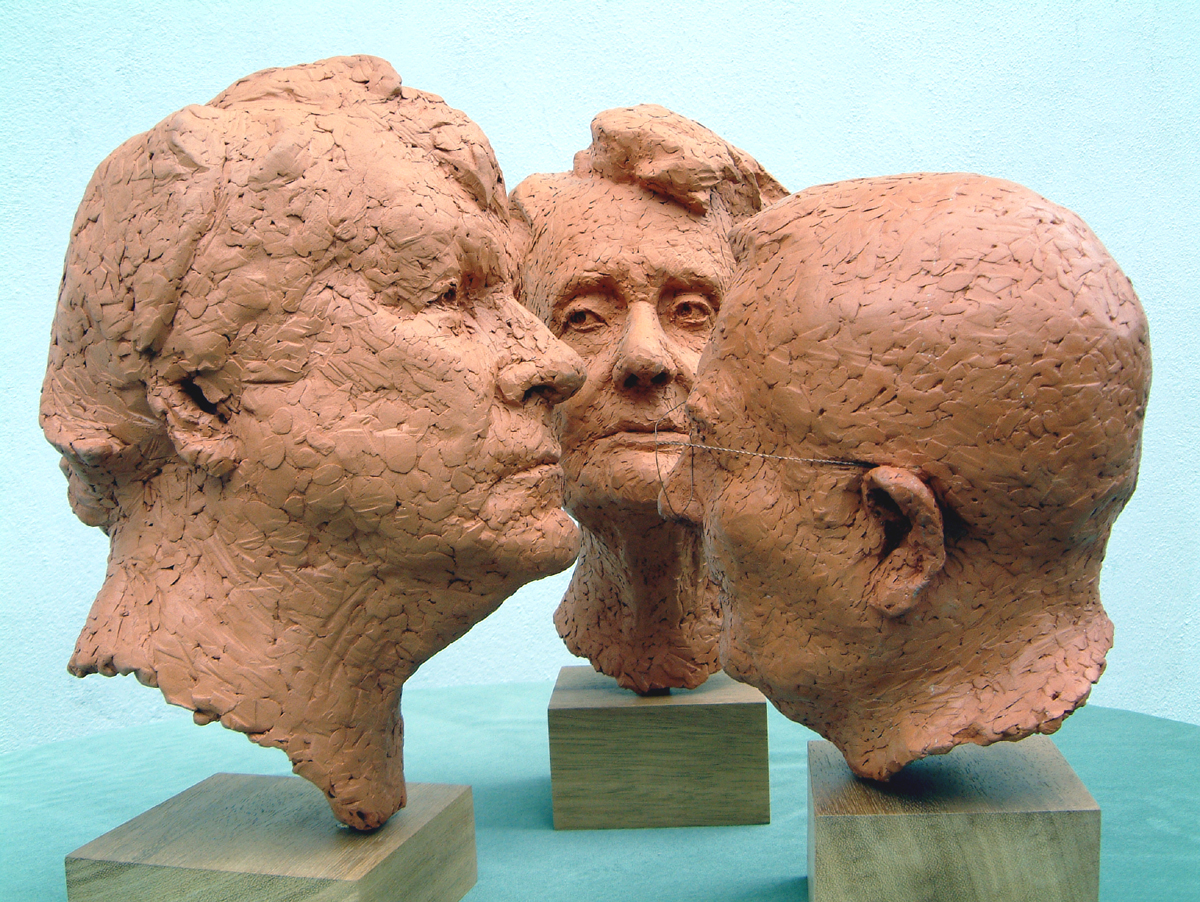
Environment Triptych

The Environment Triptych, by sculptor Jon Edgar, is a group of three portrait heads of environmental thinkers of the day. First assembled in 2008, it is composed of the terracotta heads of James Lovelock, proposer of the Gaia hypothesis, moral philosopher Mary Midgley, and writer Richard Mabey. Edgar worked with the three in either Cornwall, Newcastle upon Tyne or Norfolk during visits in 2006 and 2007.

The heads have a relevance as individual portraits, but the interplay of the three heads plinthed together seemed to add something; perhaps emphasising the sitters’ diverse efforts in influencing human behaviour and our interaction with the planet and its other organisms. The Triptych has led to the Environment Series of heads of environmentally aware sitters, including Chris Rapley, Gordon Murray, Tim Smit, and Guy Watson.
