= Environment Series =

Series of sculptures by Jon Edgar

The Environment Series Heads developed from the Environment Triptych portrait sculptures by Jon Edgar in 2006. His ongoing series of terracotta clay portraits celebrates those contributing to a sustainable future on Earth. The sculptor observes the sitter on a rotating chair, working over seven or eight hours building up the head on a wooden peg using small pieces of clay. One sitter accounted "It is the most intense and prolonged physical scrutiny I have ever had from a friend. For hours on end."

== Sitters ==
- Ronald Blythe
- Sue Clifford
- Ted Green
- Angela King
- James Lovelock
- Caroline Lucas
- Richard Mabey
- Mary Midgley
- Gordon Murray
- Peter Randall-Page
- Chris Rapley
- Fiona Reynolds
- Philippa Scott
- Guy Singh-Watson
- Tim Smit
