= Zizou (name) =

Zizou is a nickname or given name that may refer to:

- Zinedine Zidane (born 1972), French footballer nicknamed Zizou
- Zizou Bergs (born 1999), Belgian tennis player
- Louisa Young, British novelist who uses the pen name Zizou Corder
