= Lord Kennet =

Lord Kennet may refer to:

- Robert Bruce, Lord Kennet (1718–1785), Scottish advocate, legal scholar and judge
- Baron Kennet, of the Dene in the County of Wiltshire, is a title in the Peerage of the United Kingdom
  - (Edward) Hilton Young, 1st Baron Kennet (1879–1960), British politician and writer
  - Wayland Hilton Young, 2nd Baron Kennet (1923–2009), British writer, Labour Party and SDP politician who served in numerous national and international official and unofficial capacities
