= Philippa Scott =

British conservationist (1918–2010)

- Born: 22 November 1918; Bloemfontein, South Africa
- Died: 5 January 2010 (aged 91); Slimbridge, Gloucestershire, England
- Known for: Bletchley Park; Director of the Wildfowl and Wetlands Trust
- Spouse: Sir Peter Scott (m. 1951; died 1989)
- Children: 2

Felicity Philippa, Lady Scott (22 November 1918 – 5 January 2010) was a British wildlife conservationist.

== Personal life ==
Born in Bloemfontein, South Africa, Scott moved to England, and worked in the Government Code and Cypher School at Bletchley Park during World War II.

In 1951, she married Peter Scott, naturalist and founder of the Wildfowl and Wetlands Trust (WWT), in Reykjavík, Iceland, after an expedition to ring pink-footed geese. A daughter, Dafila, was born later that year (dafila is the old scientific name for a pintail). A son, Falcon, was born in 1954.

Lady Scott died, aged 91, in Slimbridge, Gloucestershire.

== Career ==
Scott was honorary director of the Wildfowl and Wetlands Trust, founded in 1948 by Sir Peter. She had a keen interest in nature and the environment and wrote numerous books about her travels from the Arctic to the Antarctic.

Scott was also a professional wildlife photographer, president of the Nature in Art Trust, scuba diver and an associate of the Royal Photographic Society.

== Publications ==
- The Art of Peter Scott (completely revised in 2008)
- Lucky Me (autobiographical)
- So Many Sunlit Hours (autobiographical)

== Legacy ==
The fish Scotts' wrasse (Cirrhilabrus scottorum) was named after Scott and her husband for their “great contribution in nature conservation".

Scott sat for a portrait head in clay by Jon Edgar at her home in Slimbridge in February 2007 as part of the sculptor's Environment Series of heads. A bronze was unveiled at the WWT Slimbridge visitor centre on 6 December 2011.

== Quotes ==
- "The Scott partnership put conservation on the map, at a time when conservation was not a word that most people understood." – Sir David Attenborough
