= Elizabeth Young, Baroness Kennet =

British writer (1923–2014)

The Right Honourable The Lady Kennet
- Born: Elizabeth Ann Adams; 14 April 1923; London, England
- Died: 30 November 2014 (aged 91)
- Education: Somerville College, Oxford
- Occupation: Writer
- Spouse: Wayland Young, 2nd Baron Kennet (m. 1948, died)
- Children: 6, including Emily Young; Louisa Young
- Writing career
- Pen name: Elizabeth Young

Elizabeth Ann Young, Baroness Kennet (née Adams; 14 April 1923 – 30 November 2014), known as simply Elizabeth Young, was a British writer, researcher, poet, artist, campaigner, analyst and questioning commentator.

== Life ==
Elizabeth Young was born in London on 14 April 1923, the only daughter of Captain Bryan Fullerton Adams DSO (22 July 1887 – 22 September 1971), and his first wife Audrey Marshall (12 June 1898 – 11 July 1929). When she was a small child, the family moved about with her father to his naval appointments. When he retired from the Navy, he was appointed Naval expert to the Disarmament Section of the League of Nations in Geneva, Switzerland.

Her first school was a French school (where she became bilingual in French), her second school was the International School of Geneva ("Ecolint"); after that she moved to an English school further up the lane, St George's School, Clarens. She returned to England to attend Downe House, whence she won an Exhibition to Somerville College, Oxford, to read Philosophy, Politics and Economics, and was awarded a two-year War Degree. After three years in the Women's Royal Naval Service, Young worked with her future brother-in-law Peter Scott in the earliest days of the Severn Wildlife Trust at Slimbridge.

In 1948, she married the Wayland Young, 2nd Baron Kennet (2 August 1923 – 7 May 2009), who inherited the title of Baron Kennet in 1960 on the death of his father, the politician Edward Hilton Young, 1st Baron Kennet. His mother was the sculptor Kathleen Scott, widow of Captain Robert Falcon Scott of the Antarctic, and daughter of Canon Lloyd Stuart Bruce and his wife Jane (née Skene). She had six children; Easter Russell, educationalist; the sculptor Emily Young; Mopsa English, educationalist; the writer Louisa Young, aka children's author Zizou Corder, and artist, writer, environmentalist and videographer Zoe Young.

== Works ==
On marrying, Young began writing, starting with an article for Vogue on the Island of Giglio in 1950. She continued to write on a wide range of mostly political issues, especially on disarmament, arms control and maritime affairs, but also on other subjects such as churches in Old London Churches (John Betjeman's Book of the Year), and Italy in Northern Lazio (winner of the 1990 European Federation Tourist Press Book Prize), both co-written with Wayland Young.

Following the publication of Old London Churches, a threat to Christ Church Spitalfields led her to set up and run the Hawksmoor Committee. At roughly the same time, she was asked by Arthur Koestler and Paul Ignotus to set up the Tibor Dery Committee, to promote the release of imprisoned Hungarian writers. Both committees were successful in their aims.

Young was also an active member of many boards and organisations including the Advisory Board for Redundant Churches; the Advisory Committee for the Protection of the Sea; the Royal United Services Institution'; the Royal Institute for International Affairs; Chatham House; the International Institute for Strategic Studies; as well as contributing to groups protecting Stonehenge.

== Selected publications ==
- Young, Elizabeth (1956). Old London churches. OCLC 1070955800.
- Young, Elizabeth (1958). Time is as time does; [poems]. OCLC 5699329.
- Young, Elizabeth (1963). Nations and nuclear weapons. OCLC 2437584.
- Young, Elizabeth (1972). A Farewell to Arms Control?. Harmondsworth: Penguin Group. ISBN 978-0-14-021593-9.
- Young, Elizabeth; Young, Wayland (1986). London's Churches. London: Grafton. ISBN 978-0-246-12961-1.

== Honors and awards ==
Young was named a fellow of the Federation of American Scientists.
