= Lionboy =

Book series by Zizou Corder

Lionman
- Cover from Lionboy
- Lionboy; Lionboy: The Chase; Lionboy: The Truth
- Author: Zizou Corder
- Country: England
- Genre: Young adult, Fantasy
- Publisher: Puffin
- Published: 2003–2006
- Media type: Print (hardback and paperback), Audiobook

Lionboy is a children's and young adult's fantasy trilogy written by Zizou Corder (the shared pen-name of English novelist Louisa Young and her daughter Isabel Adomakoh Young).

== The series ==
The book series is about a young boy named Charlie Ashanti, who is of Ghanaian and British heritage, and who can speak the language of cats, after accidentally swapping blood with a leopard cub. Charlie is on the run on a floating circus, with six lions in tow, aiming to return them to the wild of Morocco and to rescue his parents who have been kidnapped by a sinister corporation known as the Corporacy.

The first book is known simply as Lionboy. The sequel, Lionboy: The Chase, continues the story of Charlie and the lions, with most of the story set in Venice. It was published by Puffin in the summer of 2004. The final instalment of the trilogy, Lionboy: The Truth, concludes the story and was published in January 2006. The books were among the first UK children's novels to have a mixed-race hero.

== Setting ==
The series is set at an unspecified time in the Earth's future. The world in the books mostly resembles the modern day world, with a few key differences. These differences are hinted at rather than explained outright. Firstly, most of the world's oil has been used up, and petrol cars are now only used by the very rich, elite and powerful. Aeroplanes are not flown at all – sea travel is once again the dominant form of overseas travel. The world (at least, the parts seen in Charlie's journey) now seems to run efficiently on solar and wind power.

The major world superpower in the series is known only as the Empire, and the text contains hints that this is actually the United States. Europe seems to be under this Empire's control. The world has been changed by global warming and other environmental influences; the most notable example is the ruin of Venice, which is now half sunken under rising waters, and otherwise decayed from pollution.

The Corporacy, a pharmaceutical megacorporation, is a major economic power that has "Gated Communities" all over the world.

== Plot summaries ==
=== Lionboy ===
The cover for Lionboy

Charlie is a young child who is able to speak to cats (and all felines) due to an incident involving a leopard cub's blood when he was a baby. He lives in London with his parents, Ghanaian Dr. Aneba Ashanti and British Professor Magdalen Start, both of whom are scientists working on a cure for asthma and other allergies caused by contact with the family Felidae, or referred in the books as allergies.

His parents, as a result of their scientific discoveries, are kidnapped by a pharmaceutical company known mysteriously as the Corporacy. Charlie, closely avoiding being kidnapped himself, sets out to find them and ends up on board Circe, a circus ship making its way to Paris. On board he befriends most of the circus performers as well as (using the ability) a pride of beautiful performing lions who seek the boy's help to escape their cruel trainer, Maccomo. Meanwhile, the vicious criminal Rafi Sadler, who is employed by the Corporacy, is hot on his heels, going to any lengths to get his hands on Charlie. The circus ship arrives in Paris and Charlie escapes with the lions. They make their way to Gare d'Austerlitz where they hide on the Orient Express which is destined for Venice, the place Charlie's parents are rumored to have been taken.

While traversing from the Circe to the train station, Charlie and the lions meet a strange and mysterious lion-like creature. Larger, stronger and older but not as lively as the lions, a prehistoric ancestor of lions, a Smilodon fatalis finds his way into their party.

The book ends with Charlie and the lions being discovered by the train's most regal passenger, the King of Bulgaria, who surprisingly offers to help Charlie with his quest.

The cover for Lionboy: The Chase

=== Lionboy: The Chase ===
Charlie and the lions reach Venice and seek refuge at the Palazzo Bulgaria, the King himself travelling onwards and leaving the runaways in the trust of his right-hand man Edward. Edward however has other plans for the lions than letting them journey onwards. He keeps them along with Charlie prisoner and plans to present him to the corrupt ruler of Venice, the Doge. However this plan is foiled with the help of local cats and a conspiracy of gondoliers.

Venice is liberated from the Doge's rule, and so Charlie journeys from Venice by boat, taking the lions back to their home in Essaouira, Morocco but leaving the Smilodon fatalis with a trusted gondolier in Venice. Narrowly escaping drowning, they arrive there and are met by a few surprises: Maccomo, the cruel lion trainer, who is looking for revenge on Charlie for stealing his lions; and his parents, who have escaped the clutches of the Corporacy and have come to find him.

=== Lionboy: The Truth ===
The cover for Lionboy: The Truth

After only a few blissful days reunited with his parents, Charlie is captured by the revenge-seeking Maccomo, who puts him on a ship and takes him (along with Rafi) to the Corporacy headquarters on the island of San Antonio near Haiti. His parents are in hot pursuit, and following them is his parents, Claudio, King Boris, the Young Lion and Elsina.

Charlie, due to his cat blood, is immune to the tainted, brainwashing air of the island, and with the help of a multilingual chameleon named Ninu, and the cat Sergei, he single-handedly puts a stop to the Corporacy's deeds and rescues the brainwashed employees and prisoners of the island.

== Characters ==
=== Charlie and his family ===
- Charlie Ashanti, a Cat-speaking Afro-British boy.
- Aneba Ashanti, Charlie's father, a Ghanaian scientist.
- Magdalen Start, Charlie's mother, a British scientist.
- Mabel Start, Charlie's aunt and Magdalen's sister. She ran away from home to join the circus. She is a tiger trainer and envies Charlie's Cat-speaking ability.

=== The lions ===
- The Young Lion, the most adventurous of the lions and the closest friend to Charlie.
- The Oldest Lion, A humble leader of the band of circus lions, father of Elsina and the Young Lion.
- The Lionesses, who rarely speak, and are the most mysterious and deadly of the band of circus lions. One is yellowish, one is silvery and one bronze in colour.
- Elsina, the young female cub, just as adventurous as her brother the Young Lion. She stows away when the Young Lion accompanies Claudio and King Boris over the Atlantic Ocean.
- Primo, not actually a lion but a Smilodon fatalis, created in a lab from ancient DNA and rescued by the lions. Primo is adopted by the Venetians as the reincarnation of the Leone di San Marco (Lion of St Mark), and remains in Venice as a beloved protector when Charlie and the six lions leave. He is later returned by King Boris and Claudio to the forests near Essaouira to be with the wild lions.

=== Other animals ===
- Sergei, a bold, tough North England Allergeny cat who becomes one of Charlie's closest allies.
- Ninu, a smart chameleon who can speak not only English and Cat, but the languages of most humans and animals, even that of computers.
- Troy, the much-abused, yet still loyal dog of Rafi Sadler who later finds a new owner in Spain.
- Chos a cat who wanders near Charlie's house in England.
- George, the Leopard When he was a cub he was bitten by a snake and saved by Aneba. But when Charlie tried to pat him when he was a baby the cub scratched Charlie and their blood mingled, allowing the cub to speak English and Charlie to speak Cat. He is captured by the Head Chief Executive (HCE) of the corporation and imprisoned in San Antonio. When the other animals escaped, he helped Elsina and Charlie to remove a communication chip planted by the corporation to monitor their activities.

=== Thibaudet's Royal Floating Circus and Equestrian Philharmonic Academy ===
- Major Thibaudet, the owner and Master of Ceremonies of the floating circus. A fairly honourable man, unaware of the cruel treatment of the lions in his ownership.
- Maccomo, the cruel trainer of the lions, who is jealous of Charlie's ability to talk to felines. Maccomo had been drugging the lions for years, forcing them to do his bidding. In love with a tiger-trainer called Mabel Start, he wanted to marry her but was unable to as he was black and she was white. Charlie, in saving the lions from the circus, begins using Maccomo's drug against him, and Maccomo soon becomes addicted to its effects, continuing to take it of his own will after Charlie and the lions have escaped. Bent on revenge, he travels to Morocco and awaits their arrival. The lions overpower him and take him prisoner, but he outwits them and escapes, kidnapping Charlie and taking him to the Corporacy's island. There, he is not rewarded for his efforts, but rather brainwashed along with the other inhabitants of the island. He escapes, with the other inhabitants, and goes back with the lion rather than face the law
- Pirouette, the circus's star acrobat and trapeze artist. Kind to Charlie.
- Madame Barbue, the bearded lady, who is kind to Charlie.
- Mabel Start, former fiancé of Maccomo, and a tiger-trainer (whose tigers love their keeper, unlike Maccomo's lions). Through an unexpected connection to Charlie, she becomes sympathetic to his cause, though she envies Charlie's cat speaking.
- Hans, a young boy who tends to the "Learned pig".
- Julius, a young boy who assists his clown father. Friend to Charlie.
- The Lucidis, an Italian acrobat family.

=== The Corporacy and its employees ===
- Rafi Sadler, a nasty and ambitious teenage boy, who does the Corporacy's bidding for his own financial gain, but later becomes victim of the Corporacy as well. He is revealed later in the series to be Charlie's cousin.
- Winner and Sid, a pair of thugs in charge for Aneba and Magdelen's transport to France.
- Sally Ann, one of the Corporacy employees responsible for Charlie and several others kids who have been kidnapped in Africa. She has been brainwashed by the Corporacy.
- Auntie Auntie, the right hand of the HCE. She has also been brainwashed.
- The Head Chief Executive, founder and leader of the Corporacy.
- Alex, a friend of Sally Ann with the same duty. He has also been brainwashed.

=== Venice ===
- The King of Bulgaria (first name Boris), a childish and jolly man, who is delighted to know his train bears stowaways, and offers all the help he can to Charlie and the lions.
- Edward, the security advisor and right-hand man to the King. He turns out not to be entirely trustworthy, much to the King's anger. However the King forgives Edward after he learns of Edward's slight betrayal and lets Edward stay as his guard.
- Claudio, a gondolier on the canal of Venice, who is closely trusted by Charlie and the lions, and helps to overthrow the Doge. He later becomes friends with the King of Bulgaria. He becomes a close servant of the king and chases Charlie across the Atlantic.
- The Doge, the corrupt and selfish leader of Venice, who is overthrown by the Venetians with the aid of Primo, Claudio, and the others.

== Other works by the same author ==
Zizou Corder's other publications are:

- Lee Raven, Boy Thief (Puffin)
- Halo (Puffin)

Louisa Young's other publications are:

- A Great Task of Happiness (Macmillan); a biography of Kathleen Scott, sculptor and widow of Captain RF Scott of the Antarctic.
- Babylove, Desiring Cairo and Tree of Pearls (Flamingo); a trilogy of novels set in London and Egypt.
- The Book of the Heart (Flamingo) a cultural history of the human heart; its anatomy and symbolism.
- My Dear I Wanted to Tell You, The Heroes' Welcome and Devotion (Borough Press); a trilogy of novels telling the story of a man, Riley Purefoy, badly wounded in WW1, his family and their survival through the first half of the 20th century.
- You Left Early: A True Story of Love and Alcohol (Borough Press); a memoir.
- Twelve Months and a Day (Borough Press); a novel.

== Multimedia ==
The music printed in the book and available to purchase from Faber was written by composer Robert Lockhart. The illustrations are by Fred van Deelen. The theatre company Complicité created a stage show touring the UK 29 May – 21 July 2013, and the world the following year.
