= Jonathan Ball (architect) =

Co-founder of the Eden Project in Cornwall, UK

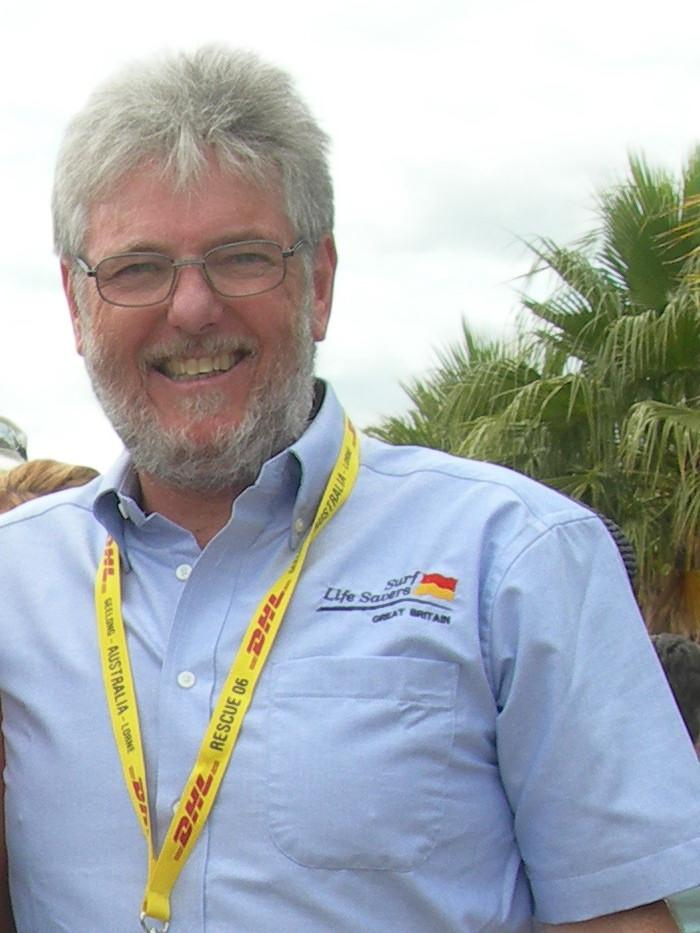
Jonathan Ball M.B.E

Jonathan Macartney Ball, MBE (born 1947) is the co-founder of the Eden Project in Cornwall, UK. He sits on the RIBA National Council

He was awarded the MBE for 'services to architecture' in 1992 and is a public speaker.

He is the author of The Other Side of Eden (FootSteps Press, 2014, ISBN 978-1908867247). and The Winds Call No Man Sir (FootSteps Press, 2015, ISBN 978-1-908867-29-2)

Founder of the Great Atlantic Way, Cornwall Occasional public speaker.[5]

Early life

Born in Bude, Cornwall, 4 June 1947, and educated Bude C of E Primary School and Truro School, Ball describes himself as first and foremost a Cornishman.

Personal Life

Married in 1974 to Victoria Blood, he has two daughters, Jemima Veryan and Morwenna Victoria, and, as of January 2026, three grandchildren, Alex Ball (21), Lamorna Luckhurst (16) and Piran Ball (14)

Professional career

1965–1972 Professional Training, The Architectural Association, London

1974-2002 Principal, The Jonathan Ball Practice, Chartered Architects, Bude, Cornwall, winners of eight national and seven regional design awards between1980 and 2001, including for lifeboat stations at Rock, Clovelly and Lyme Regis; the widely acclaimed Bude Light; and the Annual Cornwall Architectural Trust 2005 Award for Design Excellence (Eden).

Member: Royal Institute of British Architects (RIBA)

1981–1999, 2015 – 2018: Member, RIBA Council

1981 Member, British Cultural and Scientific Delegation to Romania

1982–1987 Chairman RIBA Parliamentary Affairs

1983–1985 RIBA Vice President Parliamentary Liaison

1985 Elected as a Fellow of the Royal Society of Arts

1988–1991 & 1993–1995 RIBA Honorary Secretary

1991–1993 RIBA Vice President Membership (1992 Senior Vice President)

1992 Awarded MBE for Services to Architecture

1988–1995 Trustee, British Architectural Library

2015–2018 Trustee, British Architectural Trust Board:

1987, 1989, and 2007-2008 Respectively, Freeman; Liveryman; and WCCA Master Worshipful Company of Chartered Architects (WCCA), City of London Livery

The Eden Project, Bodelva, Cornwall.

Jonathan Ball is a co-founder with Tim Smit of the internationally renowned Eden Project in Cornwall, a social enterprise flagship project designed represent Britain's contribution to the Millennium. Together they created the Eden vision, including securing the Millennium Commission's landmark project funding, and assembling the necessary professional design and horticultural teams. They also shared equally the entrepreneurial risk in developing the concept.

Unfairly ousted by the Eden board in the late 1990s, following what the High Court subsequently described as 'particularly unmeritorious' conduct by the company's lawyers, Ball's status and contribution were fully endorsed in 2003 when, in a joint public statement, Sir Ronnie Hampel, Chairman of The Eden Trust and Ken Hill, Chairman of Eden Project Ltd, confirmed: 'the role of Jonathan Ball as co-founder of The Eden Project has not been properly acknowledged in recent Eden Project publications and other media coverage'.

'We would like to set the record straight,' the statement added. 'In particular, the Eden Project Trustees and Directors of Eden Project Ltd wish to endorse the fact that Jonathan Ball and Tim Smit are the joint co-founders of The Eden Project.'

Sir Ronnie and Mr Hill also emphasised that the 'combination of Tim Smit's exceptional communication skills and Heligan experience, and Jonathan Ball's creativity, skills and professional contacts in the world of architecture, site assembly and politics, was the catalyst that turned the dream into reality'.

Their intervention, and three appearances in the Royal Courts of Justice over four years, not only enabled Ball to win his case for proper recognition of his intellectual property and legal status but also to save his name, family home, and professional reputation.

As a Cornishman, Ball continues to advocate strongly for the Eden Project.

The Great Atlantic Way, Cornwall. (GAW)

Ball conceived the GAW as a follow-on from the ideas enshrined in Eden, and as a creative forum for social enterprise to support the economic regeneration of Cornwall's rural communities through development of the visitor economy and associated business and educational opportunities. It has continued as a focus for ideas on how to achieve advantage from high-value landscape in low prosperity areas and to achieve sustainable futures for fragile low economic areas such as Cornwall. A major capital project in collaboration with the Meteorological Office and Government Office South West was shelved in 2006. At the same time, The Great Atlantic Way philosophy was shared with Failte Ireland and its Western Development Tourism Programme, which had been tasked with securing the future of rural communities on Ireland's Atlantic Coast. Adopted as The Wild Atlantic Way, it has achieved international brand status as a leading Irish visitor destination. In 2016 the GAW initiated and collaborated with the RIBA to create the RIBA Spirit of Place Bude as an exemplar of how communities establish sense of place, identity and belonging in a globalised world. GOVERNMENT MEETING HOSTED IN CORNWALL IN JUNE 2021, THE GAW WAS INVITED TO PRESENT IDEAS TO HMG FOR CREATING CORNISH LEGACY

'Following the G7 Heads of Government meeting hosted in Cornwall In June 2021, the GAW was invited to present ideas to HMG for creating Cornish Legacy. The Solar Power From Space update of the original GAW philosophy, in collaboration with Challenger Astronaut Dr Paul Scully-Power, remains under review by HMG as a contribution to the debate on the future of Planet Earth.

ROYAL NATIONAL LIFEBOAT INSTITUTION (RNLI) In 1966 Ball became a founder volunteer of the Bude Lifeboat, which was back on station for the first time since 1918, serving as volunteer crew from 1966 to 1993, the final eight of which as Senior Helmsman. Retiring on his 46th birthday. Ball then served the Station as Deputy Launching Authority 1993–2007, and subsequently on the RNLI Council 2007–2013. In 2002 he was co-author of the RNLI Beach Lifeguard Programme, which led to the RNLI patrolling the beaches of Britain and extending their charitable mission of saving lives. RNLI Awards and Commendations: Twice recipient of commendation letters from RNLI Chief of Operations 1993 letter of commendation Director RNLI 1993 RNLI Certificate of Service Velum 1966–1993 1993 commendation Station Hon Sec retiring as 'The Last of The First'. 2002 Queen's Golden Jubilee Medal for services to the RNLI. 2002 appointed Bard of Gorsedh Kernow for services to the RNLI and Surf Life Saving in Cornwall 2024 Certificate presented by Chief Executive of RNLI Bicentennial recognising 47 years' service, including 27 years as Bude lifeboat crew, 14 years as deputy launching authority and six years on the RNLI Council. During Ball's service, the lifeboat rescued 89 lives. SURF LIFE SAVING GREAT BRITAIN (SLSGB) 1959–present Bude Surf Life Saving Club (appointed Life Member 1984) 1984 SLSGB Long Service Award (1959–1984) 2000–2009 President SLSBG 2006–2008 Chairman of the Great Britain bid to host Rescue 2010, the World Life Saving Championships, under the Bid Patronage of HRH Duke of Edinburgh. 2010 Surf Lifesaving Australia: Certificate of Appreciation – in recognition of outstanding support for and contribution to SLS Australia.
