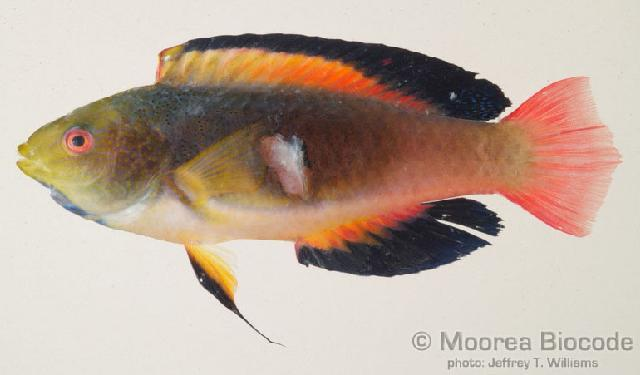

Conservation status
- Least Concern (IUCN 3.1)

Scientific classification
- Kingdom: Animalia
- Phylum: Chordata
- Class: Actinopterygii
- Order: Labriformes
- Family: Labridae
- Genus: Cirrhilabrus
- Species: C. scottorum

Binomial name
- Cirrhilabrus scottorum J. E. Randall & R. L. Pyle, 1989

= Scotts' wrasse =

Species of fish

Scotts' wrasse (Cirrhilabrus scottorum) is a species of wrasse native to the Pacific Ocean, where it occurs at depths of 3 to 40 m (9.8 to 131.2 ft) on coral reefs from Australia's Great Barrier Reef to the Pitcairn Islands. It can reach a total length of 13 cm (5.1 in). It is found in the aquarium trade.

Named in honor of Sir Peter and Lady Philippa Scott, for their contribution to nature conservation. Both had a keen interest in marine life of tropic seas, particularly of fishes. They organized the dive cruise to the Coral Sea and accompanied the authors to Osprey Reef where they collected and photographed this fish.
