= Peter Scott =

British ornithologist and conservationist (1909–1989)

Sir Peter Scott CH CBE DSC* FRS FZS
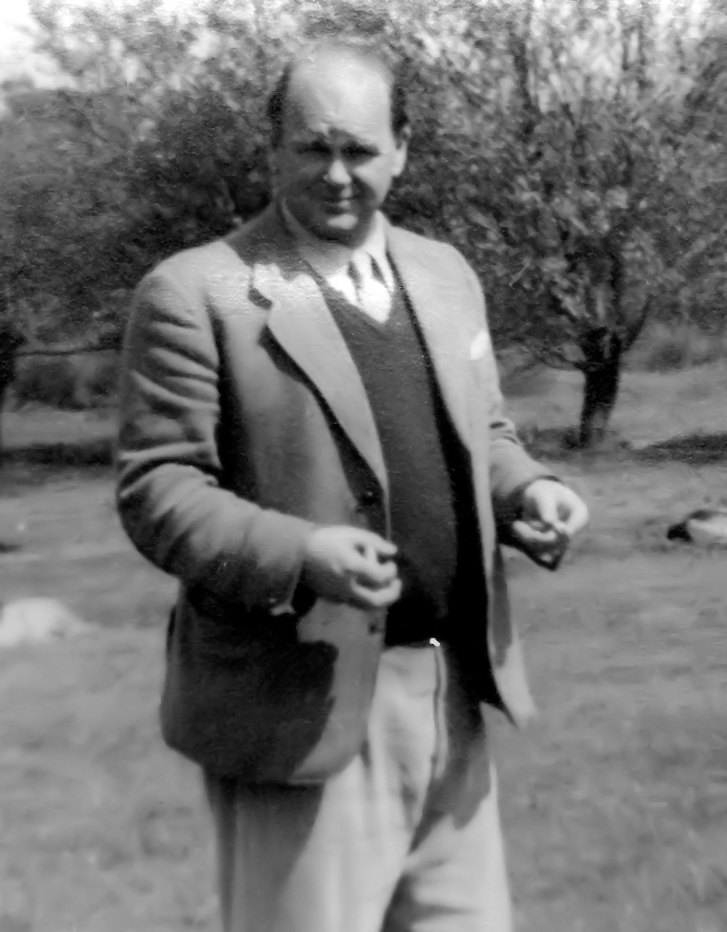
- Scott in 1954
- Born: Peter Markham Scott; 14 September 1909; London, England
- Died: 29 August 1989 (aged 79); Bristol, England
- Monuments: Statue of Sir Peter Scott at the WWT London Wetland Centre, busts at each of the Wildfowl & Wetlands Trust centres
- Occupations: Ornithologist, conservationist, aviculturist, painter, naval officer, broadcaster
- Known for: Conservation, WWT Slimbridge, painting, WWF
- Spouses: Elizabeth Jane Howard (m. 1942; div. 1951) Philippa Talbot-Ponsonby (m. 1951)
- Children: 3
- Parent(s): Robert Falcon Scott; Kathleen Bruce
- Relatives: Wayland Young, 2nd Baron Kennet (half-brother)

Sir Peter Markham Scott (14 September 1909 – 29 August 1989) was a British ornithologist, conservationist, painter, naval officer, broadcaster and sportsman. The only child of Antarctic explorer Robert Falcon Scott, he took an interest in observing and shooting wildfowl at a young age and later took to their breeding.

He established the Wildfowl & Wetlands Trust in Slimbridge in 1946 and helped found the World Wide Fund for Nature, the logo of which he designed. He was a yachting enthusiast from an early age and took up gliding in mid-life. He was part of the UK team for the 1936 Summer Olympics and won a bronze medal in sailing a one-man dinghy. He was knighted in 1973 for his work in conservation of wild animals and was also a recipient of the WWF Gold Medal and the J. Paul Getty Wildlife Conservation Prize.

== Early life ==
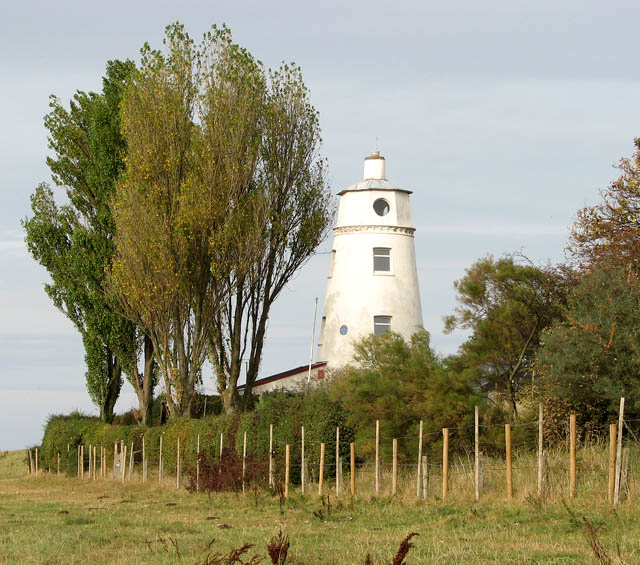
The East Lighthouse beside the Nene Outfall at Sutton Bridge, Lincolnshire, has a blue plaque recording that Scott lived there, 1933–1939

Scott was born in London at 174, Buckingham Palace Road, the only child of Antarctic explorer Robert Falcon Scott and his wife, Kathleen (née Edith Agnes Kathleen Bruce), a sculptor. He was only two years old when his father died. Robert Scott, in a last letter to his wife, advised her to "make the boy interested in natural history if you can; it is better than games." He was named after Sir Clements Markham, mentor of Scott's polar expeditions, and a godfather along with J. M. Barrie, creator of Peter Pan.

Kathleen Scott remarried in 1922. Her second husband, Hilton Young (later Lord Kennet), became stepfather to Peter. In 1923, Peter Scott's half-brother, Wayland Young, was born. Scott was educated at Oundle School and Trinity College, Cambridge, initially reading Natural Sciences but graduating in the History of Art in 1931. At Cambridge, he shared lodging with John Berry and the two shared many views.

As a student he was also an active member of the Cambridge University Cruising Club, sailing against Oxford in the 1929 and 1930 Varsity Matches. He studied art at the State Academy in Munich for a year followed by studies at the Royal Academy Schools, London. One of the few non-wildlife paintings that he produced during his career, Dinghies Racing on Lake Ontario, is held by the Cambridge University Cruising Club.

Olympic medal record

Men's sailing
Bronze medal – third place	1936 Berlin/Kiel	Monotype class

Like his mother, he displayed a strong artistic talent and he became known as a painter of wildlife, particularly birds; he had his first exhibition in London in 1933. His wealthy background allowed him to follow his interests in art, wildlife and many sports, including wildfowling, sailing, gliding and ice skating. He represented Great Britain and Northern Ireland at sailing at the 1936 Summer Olympics, winning a bronze medal in the O-Jolle monotype class. He also participated in the Prince of Wales Cup in 1938 during which he and his crew on the Thunder and Lightning dinghy designed a modified wearable harness (now known as a trapeze) that helped them win.

== Military service ==
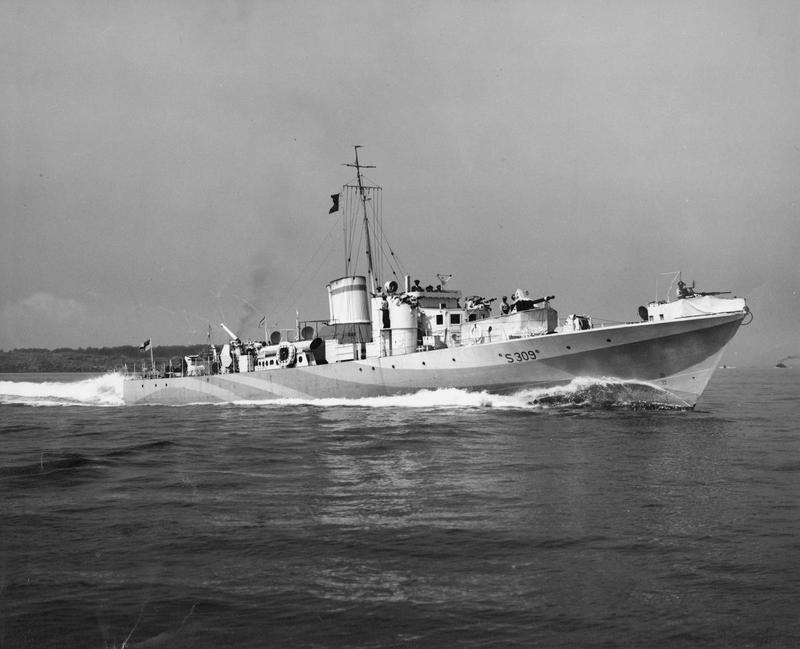
Steam Gun Boat, SGB S309, under the command of Lieutenant Commander Peter Scott

During the Second World War, Scott served in the Royal Navy Volunteer Reserve. As a sub-lieutenant, during the failed evacuation of the 51st Highland Division he was the British naval officer sent ashore at Saint-Valery-en-Caux in the early hours of 11 June 1940 to evacuate some of the wounded. This was the last evacuation of British troops from the port area of St Valery that was not disrupted by enemy fire.

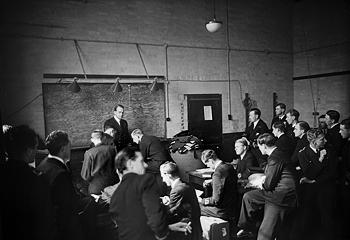
At a light coastal forces base, HMS Vernon, Operational Officer Lieutenant Commander Scott, briefs motor torpedo boat officers before they set off on anti-E-Boat patrols, June 1944

Then he served in destroyers in the North Atlantic but later moved to commanding the First (and only) Squadron of Steam Gun Boats against German E-boats in the English Channel.

Scott is credited with designing the Western Approaches ship camouflage scheme, which disguised ship superstructures. In July 1940, he managed to get the destroyer HMS Broke, in which he was serving, experimentally camouflaged, differently on the two sides. To starboard, the ship was painted blue-grey all over, but with white in naturally shadowed areas as countershading, following the ideas of Abbott Handerson Thayer from the First World War. To port, the ship was painted in "bright pale colours" to combine some disruption of shape with the ability to fade out during the night, again with shadowed areas painted white. However, he later wrote that compromise was fatal to camouflage, and that invisibility at night (by painting ships in white or other pale colours) had to be the sole objective. By May 1941, all ships in the Western Approaches (the North Atlantic) were ordered to be painted in Scott's camouflage scheme. The scheme was said to be so effective that several British ships including HMS Broke collided with each other. The effectiveness of Scott's and Thayer's ideas was demonstrated experimentally by the Leamington Camouflage Centre in 1941. Under a cloudy overcast sky, the tests showed that a white ship could approach six miles (9.6 km) closer than a black-painted ship before being seen.

On 8 July 1941, it was announced that Scott had been mentioned in despatches "for good services in rescuing survivors from a burning Vessel" in April 1941 while serving on HMS Broke. On 2 October 1942, it was announced that he had again been mentioned in despatches "for gallantry, daring and skill in the combined attack on Dieppe". He was further mentioned in despatches on 28 September 1943 for an action in the English Channel on 26 July 1943. On 1 June 1943, he was awarded the Distinguished Service Cross (DSC) "for skill and gallantry in action with enemy light forces" for an action in the English Channel on 15 April 1943 while commanding H.M. Steam Gunboat "Grey Goose". In the London Gazette of 9 November 1943, he was awarded a Bar to the DSC for actions in the English Channel on the 4th and 27 September 1943 while commanding the First SGB Flotilla. He was appointed Member of the Order of the British Empire in the Military Division (MBE) in the 1942 Birthday Honours.

== Postwar life ==
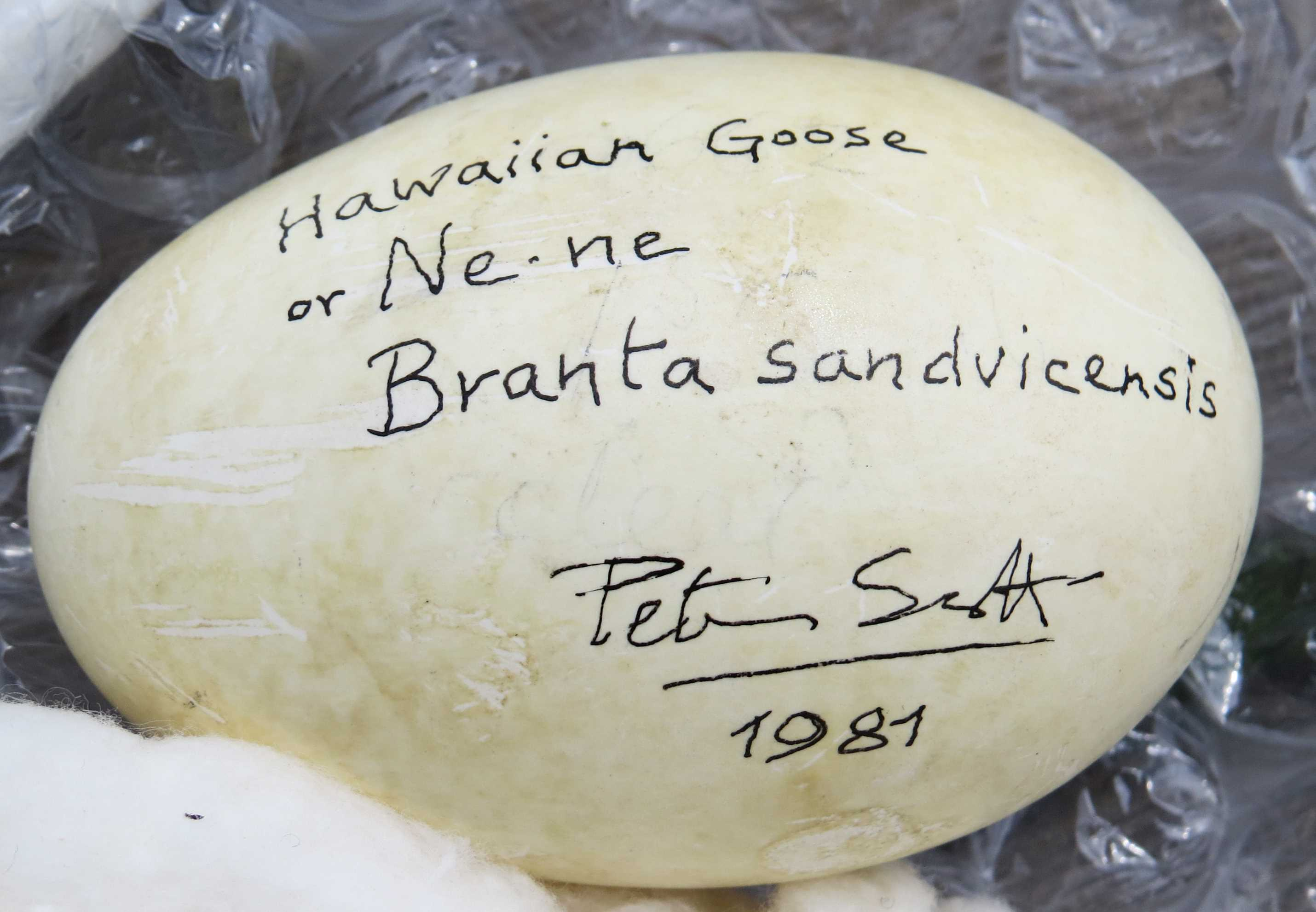
Nene egg signed by Scott

Scott stood as a Conservative in the 1945 general election in Wembley North and narrowly failed to be elected. In 1946, he founded the organisation with which he was ever afterwards closely associated, the Severn Wildfowl Trust (now the Wildfowl and Wetlands Trust) with its headquarters at Slimbridge in Gloucestershire. There, through a captive breeding programme, he saved the nene or Hawaiian goose from extinction in the 1950s. In the years that followed, he led ornithological expeditions worldwide, and became a television personality, popularising the study of wildfowl and wetlands.

His BBC natural history series, Look, ran from 1955 to 1969 and made him a household name. It included the first BBC natural history film to be shown in colour, The Private Life of the Kingfisher (1968), which he narrated. He wrote and illustrated several books on the subject, including his autobiography, The Eye of the Wind (1961). In the 1950s, he also appeared regularly on BBC radio's Children's Hour, in the series, "Nature Parliament".

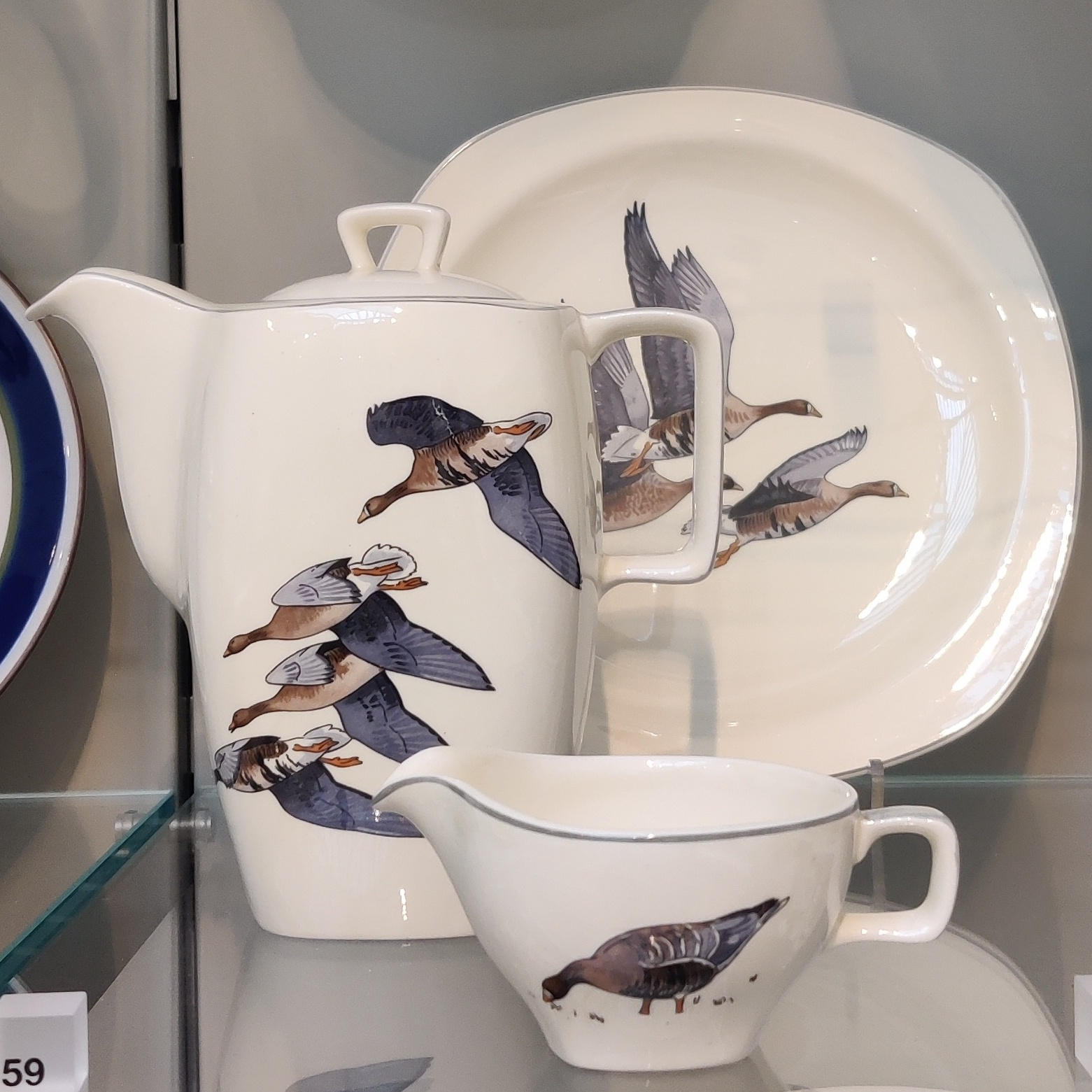
Three pieces of Midwinter Pottery 'Wild Geese' pattern tableware, with Scott's 1954 designs applied to "Stylecraft" shapes by Roy Midwinter, circa 1952, displayed in the Victoria and Albert Museum, London

In the early 1950s, his designs were used on a range of tableware, "Wild Geese", by Midwinter Pottery.

He was the subject of This Is Your Life in 1956 when he was surprised by Eamonn Andrews at the King's Theatre, Hammersmith, London.

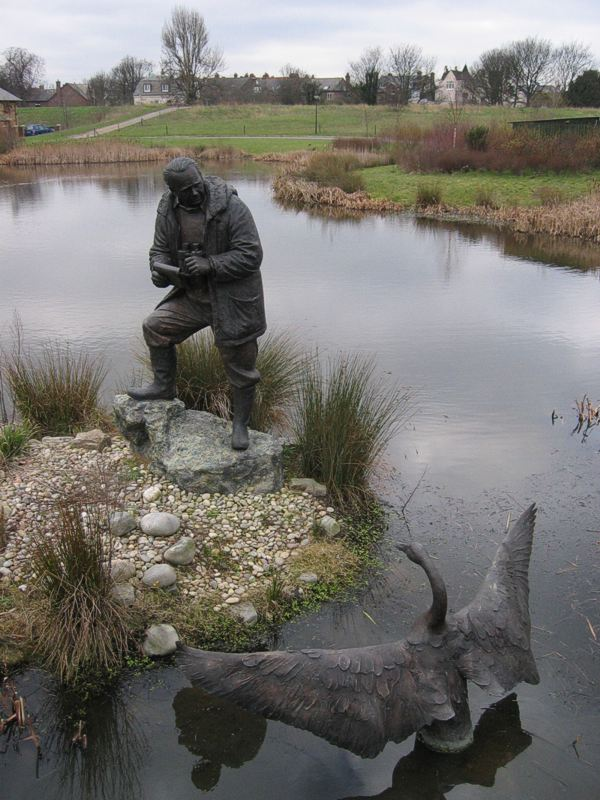
Statue at the WWT London Wetland Centre

As a member of the Species Survival Commission of the International Union for Conservation of Nature, he helped create the Red Data books, the group's lists of endangered species. Scott was the founder President of the Society of Wildlife Artists and President of the Nature in Art Trust (a role in which his wife Philippa succeeded him). Scott tutored numerous artists including Paul Karslake.

=== Gliding champion and chairman ===
Scott took up gliding in 1956 at the Bristol Gliding club, close to his Slimbridge site. He was able to buy his own glider and started to fly cross-country. This developed to competing in gliding competitions and he was British champion in 1963.

He also joined gliding committees (not normal for competition pilots) and became chairman of the British Gliding Association (BGA) for two years from 1968. He was also president of the Bristol & Gloucestershire Gliding Club.

=== Later events ===
From 1973 to 1983, Scott was Chancellor of the University of Birmingham. In 1979, he was awarded an Honorary Degree (Doctor of Science) from the University of Bath.

Scott continued with his love of sailing, skippering the 12 Metre yacht Sovereign in the 1964 challenge for the America's Cup which was held by the United States. Sovereign suffered a whitewash 4–0 defeat in a one-sided competition where the American boat was of a noticeably faster design. From 1955 to 1969 he was the president of the International Yacht Racing Union (now World Sailing).

He was one of the founders of the World Wide Fund for Nature (WWF, formerly called the World Wildlife Fund), and designed its panda logo. His pioneering work in conservation also contributed greatly to the shift in policy of the International Whaling Commission and signing of the Antarctic Treaty, the latter inspired by his visit to his father's base on Ross Island in Antarctica. In 1986 he received the WWF Gold Medal. In the same year he received the J. Paul Getty Wildlife Conservation Prize for his role as cofounder of WWF and his life-long contributions to saving endangered wildlife.

Scott was a long-time vice-president of the British Naturalists' Association, whose Peter Scott Memorial Award was instituted after his death, to commemorate his achievements.

He died of a heart attack on 29 August 1989 in Bristol, at age 79.

== Documentaries ==
Scott narrated Wild Wings, a 1966 British short documentary film, produced by British Transport Films. In 1967, it won an Oscar for Best Short Subject at the 39th Academy Awards.

In August 1986, an ITV Special was transmitted by Central Independent Television (Production No.6407) on Scott entitled Interest the Boy in Nature featuring Konrad Lorenz, Prince Philip, David Attenborough and Gerald Durrell; written, produced and directed by Robin Brown.

In 1996 Scott's life and work in wildlife conservation was celebrated in a major BBC Natural World documentary, produced by Andrew Cooper and narrated by Sir David Attenborough. Filmed across three continents from Hawaii to the Russian arctic, In the Eye of the Wind was the BBC Natural History Unit's tribute to Scott and the organisation he founded, the Wildfowl and Wetland Trust, on its 50th anniversary.

In June 2004, Scott and Sir David Attenborough were jointly profiled in the second of a three-part BBC Two series, The Way We Went Wild, about television wildlife presenters and were described as being largely responsible for the way that the British and much of the world view wildlife.

Scott's life was also the subject of a BBC Four documentary called Peter Scott – A Passion for Nature produced in 2006 by Available Light Productions (Bristol).

== Loch Ness Monster ==
In 1962, he co-founded the Loch Ness Phenomena Investigation Bureau with Conservative MP David James, who had previously been Polar Adviser on the 1948 film Scott of the Antarctic, based on his father's polar expedition. In 1975 Scott proposed the scientific name Nessiteras rhombopteryx for the Loch Ness Monster (based on a blurred underwater photograph of a supposed fin) so that it could be registered as an endangered species. The name was based on the Ancient Greek for "monster of Ness with diamond-shaped fin", but it was later pointed out by The Daily Telegraph to be an anagram of "Monster hoax by Sir Peter S". Robert H. Rines, who took two supposed pictures of the monster in the 1970s, responded by pointing out that the letters could also be read as an anagram for, "Yes, both pix are monsters, R."

== Personal life ==
Scott married the novelist Elizabeth Jane Howard in 1942 and had a daughter, Nicola, born a year later. Howard left Scott in 1946 and they were divorced in 1951.

In 1951, Scott married his assistant, Philippa Talbot-Ponsonby, while on an expedition to Iceland in search of the breeding grounds of the pink-footed goose. A daughter, Dafila, was born later in the same year (dafila is the old scientific name for a pintail). She, too, became an artist, painting birds. A son, Falcon, was born in 1954.

Scott shared a nanny (Enid) with Nigel Hadow and his son Pen Hadow.

== Civilian honours ==
Having been appointed a military MBE in the 1942 Birthday Honours, he was promoted to Commander of the Order of the British Empire in the Civil Division (CBE) in the 1953 Coronation Honours. Having been appointed a Knight Bachelor in the 1973 New Year Honours for services to conservation and the environment, he was knighted by Queen Elizabeth II during a ceremony at Buckingham Palace on 27 February 1973. In the 1987 Birthday Honours, he was appointed to the Order of the Companions of Honour as a Member (CH) "for services to conservation". In 1987 he was also elected Fellow of the Royal Society.

== Legacy ==
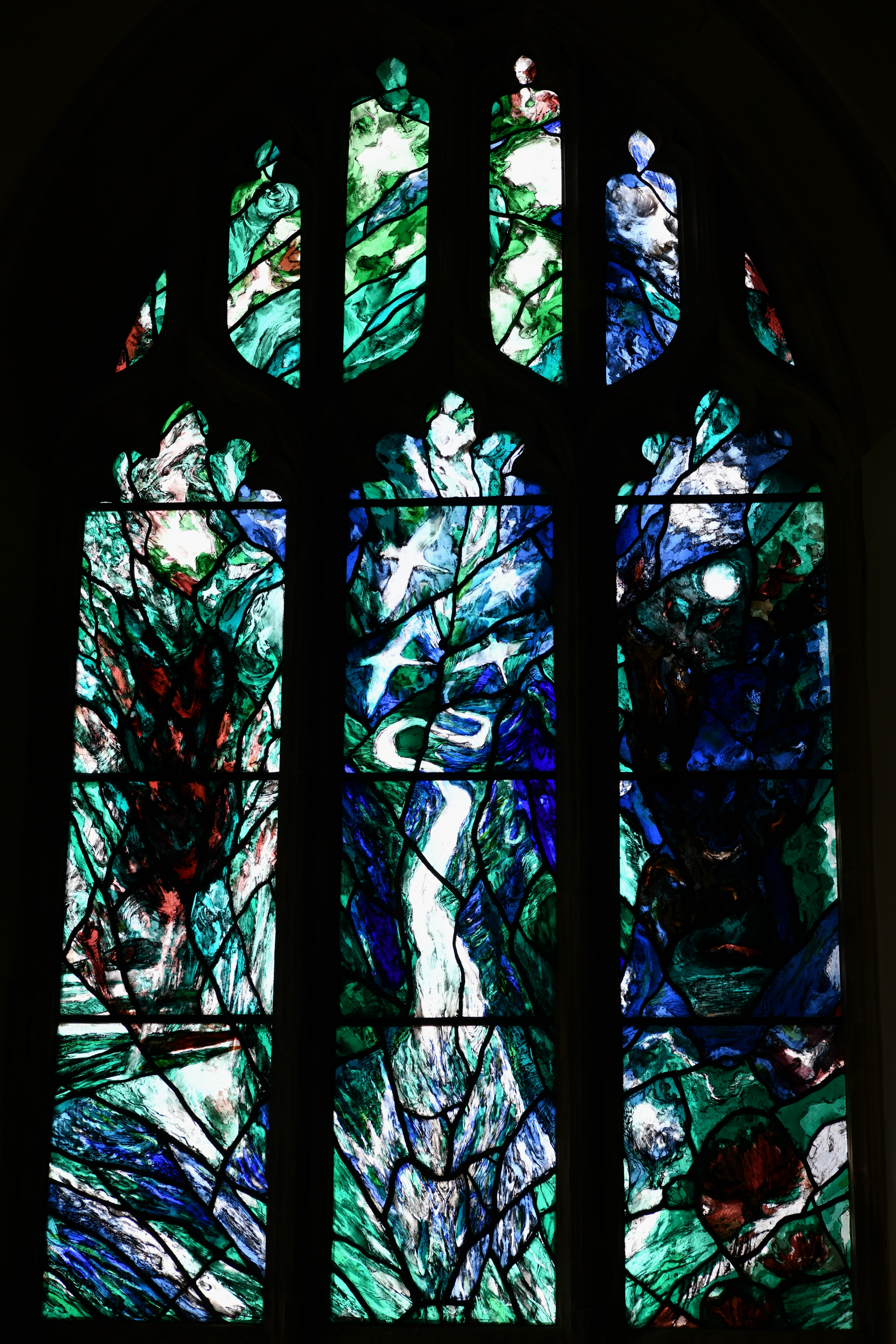
Sir Peter Scott memorial window at St John's Church, Slimbridge

In his autobiography The Eye of the Wind, Scott wrote that Paul Gallico drew on aspects of his life in creating Philip Rhayader, the central character in The Snow Goose, and that he felt he was “only thinly disguised” in the character.

The fish Scotts' wrasse Cirrhilabrus scottorum was named after Peter and Philippa Scott for their “great contribution in nature conservation".

The Peter Scott Walk passes the mouth of the River Nene and follows the old sea bank along The Wash, from Scott's lighthouse near Sutton Bridge in Lincolnshire to the ferry crossing at King's Lynn.

The Sir Peter Scott National Park is located in central Jamnagar, in Gujarat, India. Jamnagar also has a Sir Peter Scott Bird Hospital. These institutions in Jamnagar were founded as a result of the friendship between Peter Scott and Jam Sahib, the Indian ruler of Jamnagar.

Scott is remembered in a stained glass window at the Church of St John in Slimbridge. It was made by the artist Thomas Denny and installed in 1994. Denny's design takes as its theme the words of Psalm 104, written in praise of creation and including the line The birds of the sky nest by the waters; they sing among the branches. The central light shows birds flying over a meandering river.

== Bibliography ==
- Morning flight. Country Life, London 1936–44.
- Wild chorus. Country Life, London 1939.
- Through the Air. (with Michael Bratby). Country Life, London 1941.
- The battle of the narrow seas. Country Life, White Lion & Scribners, London, New York 1945–74. ISBN 0-85617-788-1
- Portrait drawings. Country Life, London 1949.
- Key to the wildfowl of the world. Slimbridge 1950.
- Wild geese and Eskimos. Country Life & Scribner, London, New York 1951.
- A thousand geese. Collins, Houghton & Mifflin, London, Boston 1953/54.
- A coloured key to the wildfowl of the world. Royle & Scribner, London, New York 1957–88.
- Wildfowl of the British Isles. Country Life, London 1957.
- The eye of the wind. (autobiography) Hodder, Stoughton & Brockhampton, London, Leicester 1961–77. ISBN 0-340-04052-1, ISBN 0-340-21515-1
- Animals in Africa. Potter & Cassell, New York, London 1962–65.
- My favourite stories of wild life. Lutterworth 1965.
- Our vanishing wildlife. Doubleday, Garden City 1966.
- Happy the man. Sphere, London 1967.
- Atlas en couleur des anatidés du monde. Le Bélier-Prisma, Paris 1970.
- The wild swans at Slimbridge. Slimbridge 1970.
- The swans. Joseph, Houghton & Mifflin, London, Boston 1972. ISBN 0-7181-0707-1
- The amazing world of animals. Nelson, Sunbury-on-Thames 1976. ISBN 0-17-149046-0
- Observations of wildlife. Phaidon & Cornell, Oxford, Ithaca 1980. ISBN 0-7148-2041-5, ISBN 0-7148-2437-2, ISBN 0-8014-1341-9
- Travel diaries of a naturalist. Collins, London. 3 vols: 1983, 1985, 1987. ISBN 0-00-217707-2, ISBN 0-00-219232-2, ISBN 0-00-219554-2
- The crisis of the University. Croom Helm, London 1984. ISBN 0-7099-3303-7, ISBN 0-7099-3310-X
- Conservation of island birds. Cambridge 1985. ISBN 0-946888-04-3
- The art of Peter Scott. Sinclair-Stevenson, London 1992 p. m. ISBN 1-85619-100-1

=== Forewords ===
- The Red Book – Wildlife in Danger James Fisher, Noel Simon & Jack Vincent, Collins, 1969
  - The acknowledgments in this book credit Scott with originating the idea behind it
- George Edward Lodge – Unpublished Bird Paintings C.A. Fleming (Michael Joseph) 1983 ISBN 0-7181-2212-7

=== Illustrations ===
- Christian, Garth (1961). Down the Long Wind – a study of bird migration. London: Newnes. pp. 240 p. : illus, 23 cm.
- Waterfowl of the World – with Jean Delacour, Country Life 1954
- Gallico, Paul (1946), The Snow Goose, Michael Joseph, London. Four full-page colour paintings, plus numerous black-and-white line drawings.

=== Films ===
- Wild Wings (1966), narrator

== Autobiography ==
- Scott, Peter (1966). The Eye of the Wind. An Autobiography (2 ed.). Hodder & Stoughton.

Academic offices
Preceded by John Bannerman	Rector of the University of Aberdeen; 1960–1963	Succeeded by Sir John Hunt
Preceded by The Earl of Avon	Chancellor of the University of Birmingham; 1973–1983	Succeeded by Alex Jarratt
