= Louisa Young =

English novelist, born late 20th century

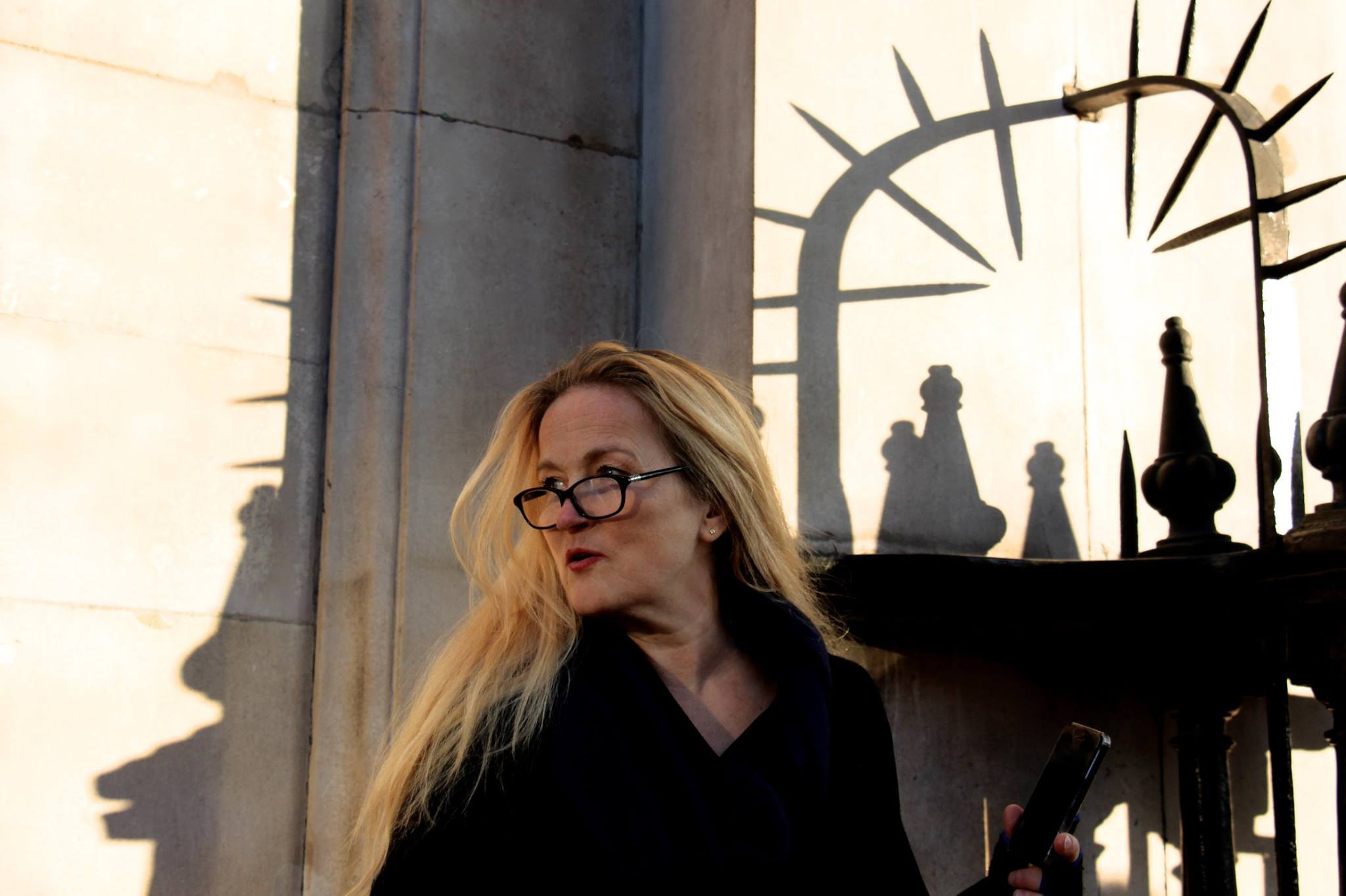
- Louisa Young in 2018
- Born: London, England
- Education: Trinity College, Cambridge
- Occupations: Novelist; songwriter; short-story writer; biographer; journalist
- Children: Isabel Adomakoh Young
- Parents: Wayland Young (father); Elizabeth Adams (mother)
- Relatives: Emily Young (sister); Hilton Young (grandfather); Kathleen Scott (grandmother)
- Writing career
- Pen name: Zizou Corder
- Period: 1995–present
- Website: louisayoung.co.uk

Louisa Young is a British novelist, songwriter, short-story writer, biographer and journalist. By 2023 she had published seven novels under her own name and five with her daughter, Isabel Adomakoh Young, under the pen name Zizou Corder. She has written three non-fiction books, The Book of the Heart (Flamingo, 2000), A Great Task of Happiness: The Life of Kathleen Scott (Macmillan, 1995; Lulu, 2012) and You Left Early: A True Story of Love and Alcohol (Borough Press, 2018), an account of her relationship with the composer Robert Lockhart. Her novel, Twelve Months and a Day, was published in June 2022 (Borough Press) in the UK, and in the US in January 2023 (Putnam). Her most recent novel, 'The Golden Hours' is a continuation of the Cazalet Chronicles and published in September 2026 (Mantle, Pan Macmillan). She is a Fellow of the Royal Society of Literature.

== Prizes ==
Young's work has been nominated and shortlisted for prizes that include the Orange Prize for Fiction, the Costa Book of the Year, the Costa Novel of the Year, the Galaxy Audiobook of the Year Prize, which it won, the Booktrust Teenage Prize, the Carnegie Medal, the International Dublin Literary Award, the Wellcome Book Prize and the Folio Prize. It has been chosen by the Richard and Judy Book Club.

== Early life ==
Louisa Young was born in London, England, to the politician and writer Wayland Young (Lord Kennet) and Elizabeth Young, Lady Kennet. She has five siblings, including the sculptor Emily Young. She was educated at Paddington's Hallfield Primary School, St Paul's Girls' School, Westminster School and Trinity College, Cambridge, where she read history.

== Career ==
Young worked as a sub-editor, a freelance columnist and feature writer on national publications, including The Guardian, the Sunday Times, the Daily Express, Marie Claire, Tatler, Bike and Motorcycle International. She also worked at various stages as a despatch rider, a busker (double bass and vocals), a waitress, a kitchen-hand and a shop assistant.

Her first book, A Great Task of Happiness, was a biography of her grandmother Kathleen Scott, widow of Robert Falcon Scott, British Antarctic explorer, published by Macmillan Publishers in 1995. Then came three novels set in London and Egypt: Baby Love, Desiring Cairo and Tree of Pearls (Flamingo). Baby Love was listed for the Orange Prize for Fiction. These were followed in 2002 by The Book of the Heart, a cultural history of the heart as it is seen through art, religion, love and anatomy. In 2007 she was a curatorial advisor for the Wellcome Foundation exhibition The Heart, which was inspired by her book.

She co-authored five books for children with her daughter, Isabel Adomakoh Young: Lionboy, Lionboy: The Chase, Lionboy: The Truth, Lee Raven, Boy Thief, and Halo. The Lionboy trilogy was translated into 36 languages, and they were among the first UK children's novels to have a mixed-race hero of colour. Halo, set in ancient Greece, was shortlisted for the Booktrust Teenage Prize in 2010, and nominated for the Carnegie Medal in 2011. The film rights to Lionboy have been sold three times, including twice to Steven Spielberg's DreamWorks. A stage production by Complicité was directed by Annabel Arden, adapted by Marcelo Dos Santos with Arden, Young and the company, and starred Adetomiwa Edun. It opened in 2013 at the Bristol Old Vic and toured the UK to favourable reviews. It was reprised at the Tricycle Theatre, London, the New Victory Theatre, New York, and in Hong Kong and South Korea in 2014/2015.

In 2011, she published My Dear, I Wanted to Tell You, a First World War novel shortlisted for the Costa Novel of the Year Award and the Wellcome Book Prize, which won the Galaxy Audiobook of the Year Award 2012, read by actor Dan Stevens and with music by Robert Lockhart. It was chosen for the Richard & Judy Book Club in 2012; nominated for the International Dublin Literary Award 2013, and was BBC Radio Four's Book at Bedtime in January 2012, read by Olivia Colman. It was the London Cityread choice for 2014 and has been sold in 15 languages. The Heroes' Welcome, a sequel, was published in the UK in 2014 and nominated for the Folio Prize that year. Devotion, the third book in the series, was published in June 2016.

She has contributed to various anthologies, including I Am Heathcliff (ed. Kate Mosse), Underground; Tales for London (ed. Ann Bissell), A Love Letter to Europe (Coronet) and Of The Flesh (ed. Suzie Dorée).

Young's memoir You Left Early: A True Story of Love and Alcohol (Borough Press, 2018), covers her relationship with Robert Lockhart and addiction, talent, love, class and death.

Her novel Twelve Months and a Day was published in the UK by Borough Press in June 2022, and by Putnam in the US in January 2023.

== Works ==
=== Fiction ===
==== Egypt trilogy ====
- Baby Love (London: Flamingo, 1997; Borough Press, 2015)
- Desiring Cairo (Flamingo, 1999; Borough Press, 2015)
- Tree of Pearls (Flamingo, 2000, Borough Press, 2015)

==== The First World War Trilogy ====
- My Dear, I Wanted to Tell You (HarperCollins, March 2011; Paperback: January 2012; US 2011)
- The Heroes' Welcome (Borough Press, May 2014)
- Devotion (Borough Press, June 2016)

==== Standalone ====
- Twelve Months and a Day (Borough Press, June 2022; Putnam 2023)

==== The Cazalet Chronicles ====
- The Golden Hours (Mantle, September 2026)

==== By Zizou Corder ====
Zizou Corder is the joint pseudonym of mother-and-daughter co-authors Louisa Young and Isabel Adomakoh Young.

- Lionboy (Puffin, 2003)
- Lionboy: The Chase (Puffin, 2003)
- Lionboy: The Truth (Puffin, 2005)
- Lee Raven, Boy Thief (Puffin, 2007)
- Halo (Puffin, 2009)
- "The Intrepid Dumpling's Dugong Story", in The Just When Stories (Beautiful Books, 2010)

=== Non-fiction ===
- A Great Task of Happiness: The Life of Kathleen Scott (Macmillan, 1995); reissued by The Hydraulic Press, Lulu, 2012
- The Book of the Heart (Flamingo, 2002)
- You Left Early: A True Story of Love and Alcohol (Borough Press, April 2018)

=== Radio ===
- Ruby Baby radio drama, BBC Radio 7, 2010
- She Wiped the Surface and Put the kettle On, BBC Radio 4, read by Emma Fielding, 2012
