= Tim Smit =

British businessman

Sir Tim Smit KBE
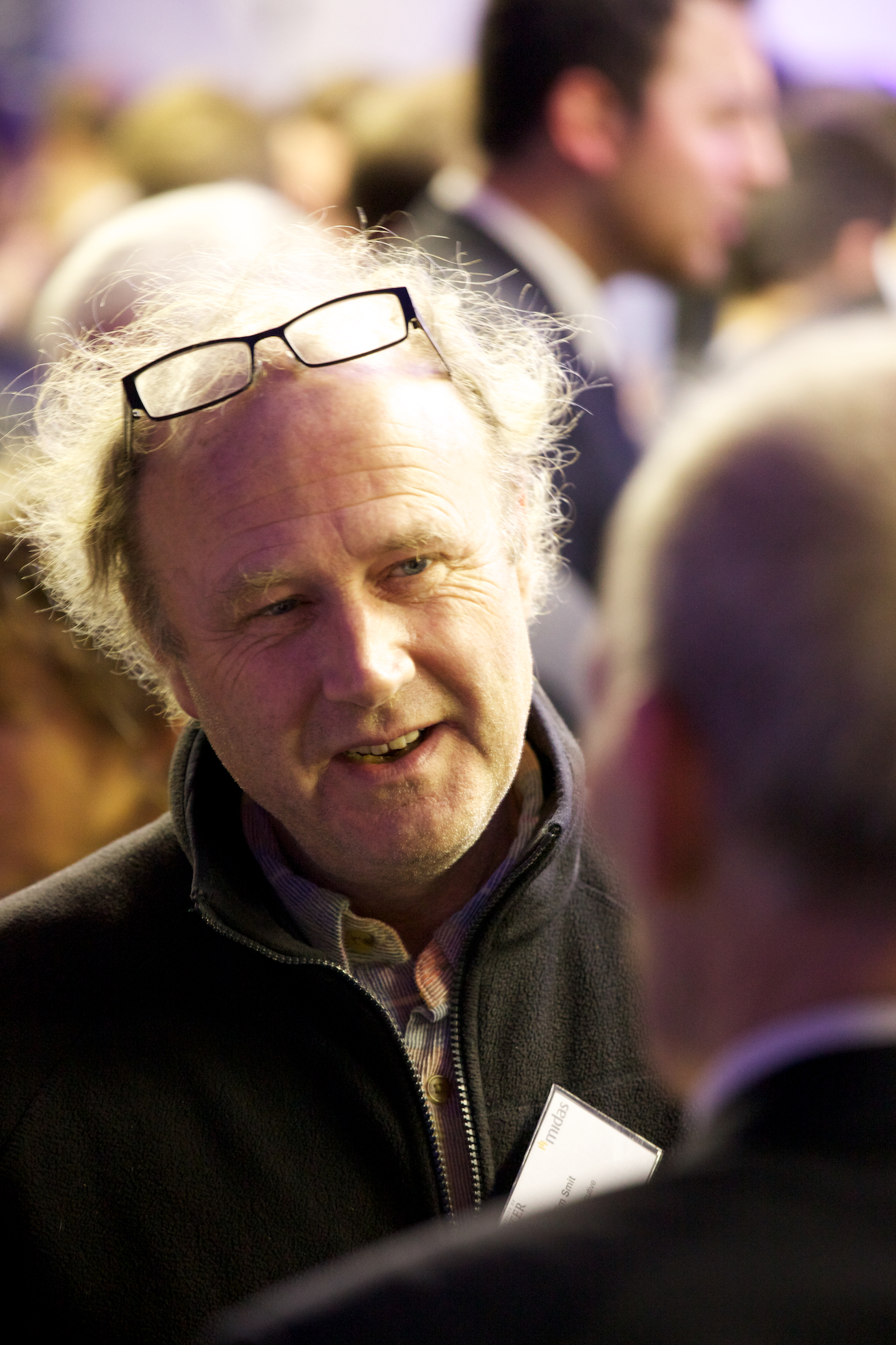
- Smit in 2011
- Born: Timothy Bartel Smit; 25 September 1954 (age 71); Scheveningen, The Hague, Netherlands
- Citizenship: British and Dutch citizenship
- Education: Hatfield College, Durham
- Occupation: Businessman
- Known for: Lost Gardens of Heligan and Eden Project
- Spouse: Candy Pinsent (m. 1978, divorced) Charlotte Russell (m. 2024)
- Children: 4

Sir Timothy Bartel Smit (born 25 September 1954) is a Dutch-born British businessman who jointly helped create the Lost Gardens of Heligan, and the Eden Project in Cornwall, United Kingdom.

== Early life ==
Tim Smit was born in Scheveningen, The Hague, the son of airline KLM chief executive Jan Smit and his English wife. He was educated in England at Vinehall School, East Sussex, and Cranbrook School, Kent, before going on to study archaeology and anthropology at Hatfield College, Durham.

== Career ==
He worked as an archaeologist before working as both a songwriter and producer receiving seven platinum and gold discs.

In 1987, he moved with his family to Cornwall and became involved with Rob Poole, John Nelson and The Lost Gardens of Heligan. Smit wrote a book about the project.

Tim Smit in conversation with Silver Donald Cameron about his work.

With architect Jonathan Ball, he jointly created the Eden Project, near St Austell, an £80 million initiative to build two transparent biomes in an old china clay pit near the village of Bodelva. The biomes contain different eco-climates; rainforest and Mediterranean. The outside area is also described as a biome and has areas such as "Wild Cornwall". Eden aims to educate people about environmental matters and encourages a greater understanding and empathy with these matters. Smit raised the funds and the site design was by Nicholas Grimshaw. Smit has claimed that The Eden Project has contributed over £1 billion into the Cornish economy.

Smit's book about the creation of the Eden Project, Eden, was published in 2001 and updated on the 10th anniversary of the opening in March 2011.

Smit was appointed an Honorary Commander of the Order of the British Empire (CBE) in 2002, and awarded the Kilgerran Award of the Foundation for Science and Technology in 2003. In 2006, he was awarded an honorary Doctor of Design degree by the University of the West of England "in recognition of his outstanding achievements in promoting the understanding and practice of the responsible management of the vital relationship between plants, people and resources, which have made a major contribution regionally, nationally and internationally to sustainable development, tourism, architecture and landscape architecture".

Smit has been outspoken in his views on issues such as social enterprise and entrepreneurship. In a 2008 interview, he said:

Britain is crap at being entrepreneurial because (a) it's a risk averse country, and (b) the stigma of failure is so high that if you fail you're considered to be a loser. Entrepreneurism is a word that has been stolen by people who don't understand it. The truth is that people who are entrepreneurial take risks, and risk is something that is un-British, and if you're successful with it they'll hate you for it.

In the early 21st century, Smit became a Social Enterprise Ambassador.

He was the subject of This Is Your Life in 2001, when he was surprised by Michael Aspel at the Eden Project.

Smit was appointed Honorary Knight Commander of the Order of the British Empire (KBE) in January 2011 in recognition of his services to public engagement with science. In May 2012, the award was made substantive when he became a British citizen, allowing Smit to use the title "Sir".

In November 2016, Smit was awarded an honorary Doctor of Education degree by Bournemouth University.

Smit is one of the backers of the Eden Westwood project, a joint project between the Eden Project and developers Westwood to build a 175-acre (71 hectares) leisure and tourism destination at Junction 27 of the M5 in Devon. The development was included in the Mid Devon Local Plan which was adopted in July 2020. In January 2021 Smit submitted plans for a development in Lostwithiel consisting of an orchard with 3,000 fruit trees, a pottage garden, a multi-use building with cookery school, microbrewery, distillery, cider press and 20 accommodation units.

== Politics ==
In August 2014, Smit was one of 200 public figures who were signatories to a letter to The Guardian opposing Scottish independence in the run-up to September's referendum on that issue.

Prior to the 2015 UK general election, he was one of several celebrities who endorsed the parliamentary candidacy of the Green Party's Caroline Lucas.

== Portraits of Smit ==
The National Portrait Gallery collection has two photographs of Tim Smit from 2002. In 2008, Smit agreed to sit for sculptor Jon Edgar in Fowey as part of his Environment Series.

== Controversy ==
In 2004, Eden Project co-founder Jonathan Ball won over £1.8m in damages from the law firm Druces & Attlee, which the High Court found had failed to secure Ball's and Smit's just financial reward when Ball left the project in 1997. The couple fell out, though a separate legal dispute between them was settled amicably in 2002.

In February 2022, Smit criticised what he regarded as the backward-looking tendency of some Cornish people.
