= Mary Midgley =

English philosopher (1919–2018)

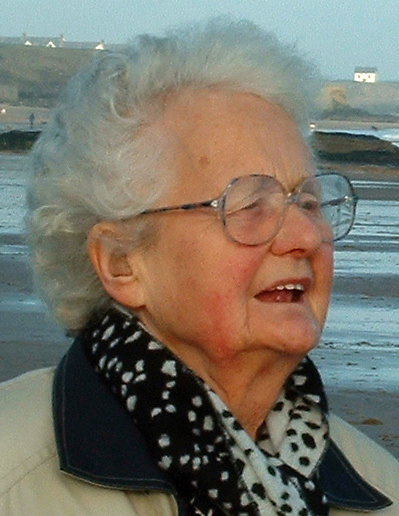
- Midgley in 2002
- Born: Mary Scrutton; 13 September 1919; London, England
- Died: 10 October 2018 (aged 99); Jesmond, Newcastle, England
- Spouse: Geoffrey Midgley (m. 1950)

Education
- Education: Somerville College, Oxford (B.A.)

Philosophical work
- Era: Contemporary philosophy
- Region: Western philosophy
- School: Analytic philosophy
- Institutions: Somerville College, Oxford
- Main interests: Moral philosophy, animal rights, philosophy of science, ethology, evolution
- Notable works: Beast and Man (1978); Animals and Why They Matter (1983); Evolution as a Religion (1985); Science as Salvation (1992)

Mary Beatrice Midgley (née Scrutton; 13 September 1919 – 10 October 2018) was a British philosopher. A senior lecturer in philosophy at Newcastle University, she was known for her work on science, ethics and animal rights. She wrote her first book, Beast and Man (1978), when she was in her late fifties, and went on to write over 15 more, including Animals and Why They Matter (1983), Wickedness (1984), The Ethical Primate (1994), Evolution as a Religion (1985), and Science as Salvation (1992). She was awarded honorary doctorates by Durham and Newcastle universities. Her autobiography, The Owl of Minerva, was published in 2005.

Midgley strongly opposed reductionism and scientism, and argued against any attempt to make science a substitute for the humanities. She wrote extensively about what she thought philosophers can learn from nature, particularly from animals. Midgley insisted that humans ought to be understood as first and foremost, a kind of animal. Several of her books and articles discussed philosophical ideas appearing in popular science, including those of Richard Dawkins. She also wrote in favour of a moral interpretation of the Gaia hypothesis. The Guardian described her as a fiercely combative philosopher and the UK's "foremost scourge of 'scientific pretension'".

== Early life and education ==
Midgley was born in London to Lesley and Tom Scrutton. Her father, the son of the eminent judge Sir Thomas Edward Scrutton, was a curate in Dulwich and later chaplain of King's College, Cambridge. She was raised in Cambridge, Greenford and Ealing, and educated at Downe House School in Cold Ash, Berkshire, where she developed her interest in classics and philosophy:

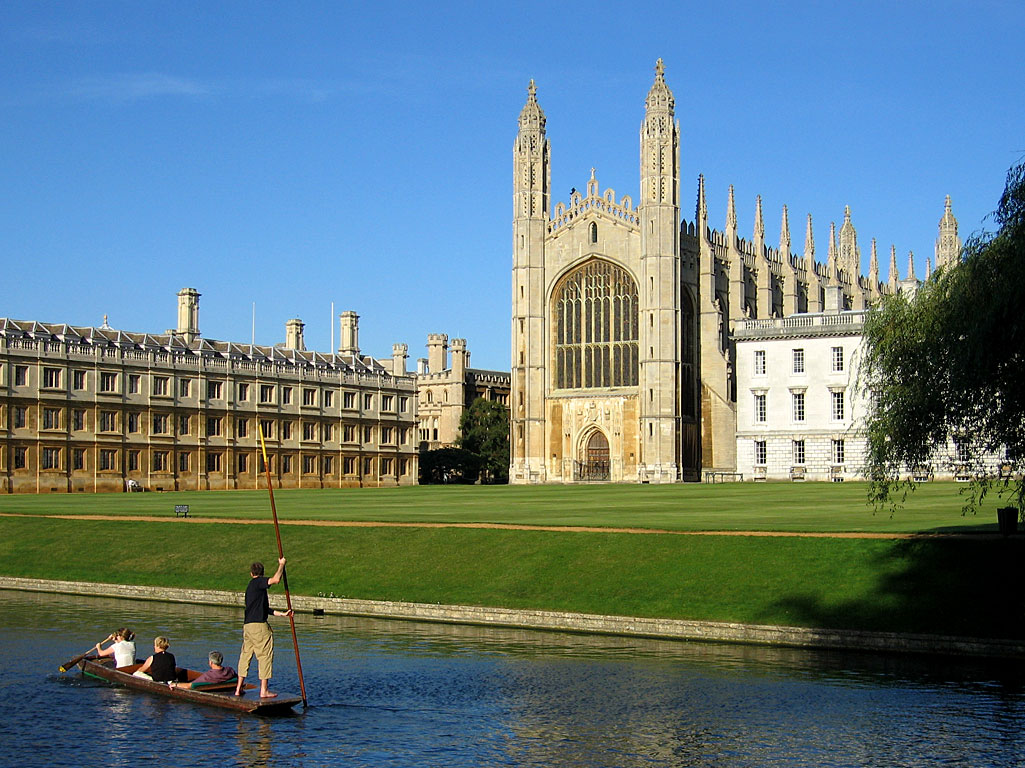
Midgley's father was a King's College chaplain.

[A] new and vigorous Classics teacher offered to teach a few of us Greek, and that too was somehow slotted into our timetables. We loved this and worked madly at it, which meant that with considerable efforts on all sides, it was just possible for us to go to college on Classics … I had decided to read Classics rather than English – which was the first choice that occurred to me – because my English teacher, bless her, pointed out that English literature is something that you read in any case, so it is better to study something that you otherwise wouldn't. Someone also told me that, if you did Classics at Oxford, you could do Philosophy as well. I knew very little about this but, as I had just found Plato, I couldn't resist trying it.

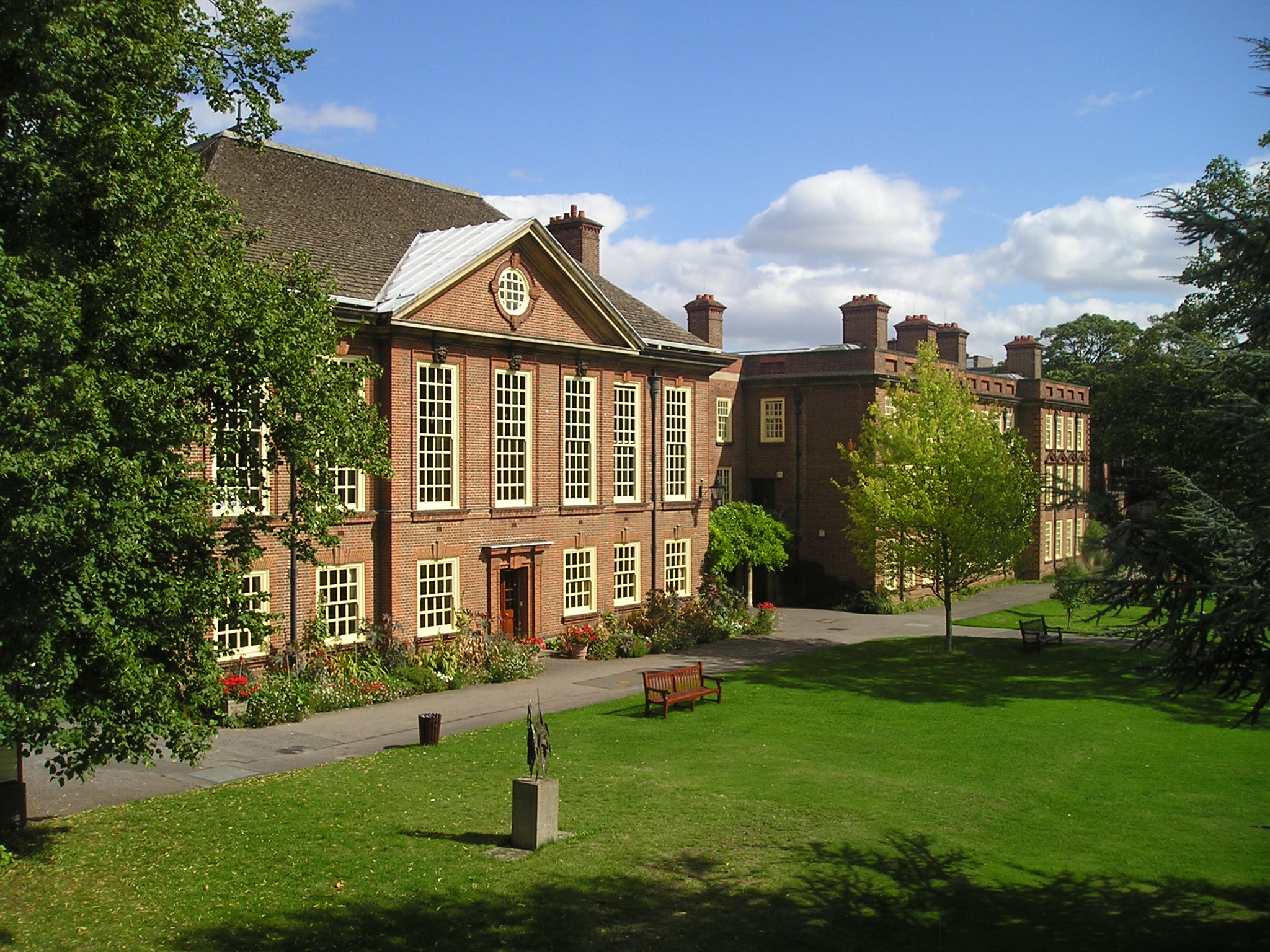
Midgley studied Greats at Oxford, going up to Somerville in 1938.

Midgley took the Oxford entrance exam in the autumn of 1937, gaining a place at Somerville College. During the year before starting university, it was arranged that she would live in Austria for three months to learn German, but she had to leave after a month because of the worsening political situation. At Somerville she studied Mods and Greats alongside Iris Murdoch, graduating with a first-class honours degree.

Several of her lasting friendships that began at Oxford were with scientists, and she credited them with having educated her in a number of scientific disciplines. After a split in the Labour club at Oxford over the Soviet Union's actions, she was on the committee of the newly formed Democratic Socialist Club alongside Tony Crosland and Roy Jenkins.

During Midgley's time at Oxford, many of the young male undergraduates left to fight in the Second World War. This left the women undergraduates in an unlikely position: for the first time they made up the majority in the student body. Recalling this time, Midgley writes "I think myself that this experience has something to do with the fact that Elizabeth [Anscombe] and I and Iris [Murdoch] and Philippa Foot and Mary Warnock have all made our names in philosophy... I do think that in normal times a lot of good female thinking is wasted because it simply doesn't get heard." Interest in the philosophy of the women philosophers at this time sparked the interest of two philosophers at Durham University, who began a project called In Parenthesis, which explores the connections between four women philosophers (Foot, Anscombe, Midgley and Murdoch).

== Career ==
Midgley left Oxford in 1942 and went into the civil service, as "the war put graduate work right out of the question". Instead, she "spent the rest of the war doing various kinds of work that were held to be of national importance". During this time she was also a teacher at Downe School and Bedford School. She returned to Oxford in 1947 to do graduate work with Gilbert Murray. She began research on Plotinus's view of the soul, which she has described as "so unfashionable and so vast that I never finished my thesis". In retrospect Midgley has written of her belief that she is "lucky" to have missed out on having a doctorate. She argues that one of the main flaws in doctoral training is that, while it "shows you how to deal with difficult arguments", it does not "help you to grasp the big questions that provide its context – the background issues out of which the small problems arose."

In 1949 Midgley went to Reading University, teaching in the philosophy department there for four terms. In 1950 she married Geoffrey Midgley (died 1997), also a philosopher. They moved to Newcastle, where he got a job in the philosophy department of Newcastle University. Midgley stopped teaching for several years while she had three sons (Tom, David and Martin), before also getting a job in the philosophy department at Newcastle, where she and her husband were both "much loved". Midgley taught there between 1962 and 1980. During her time at Newcastle, she began studying ethology and this led to her first book, Beast and Man (1978), published when she was 59. "I wrote no books until I was a good 50, and I'm jolly glad because I didn't know what I thought before then."

== Awards ==
Midgley was awarded an honorary D.Litt. by Durham University in 1995 and an honorary Doctor of Civil Law by Newcastle University in 2008. She was an honorary fellow of the Policy, Ethics and Life Sciences Research Centre at Newcastle University. In 2011 she was the first winner of the Philosophy Now Award for Contributions in the Fight Against Stupidity.

== Death ==
Midgley died at the age of 99 in Jesmond on 10 October 2018.

== Ideas and arguments ==
=== The purpose of philosophy ===
Midgley argued that philosophy is like plumbing, something that nobody notices until it goes wrong. "Then suddenly we become aware of some bad smells, and we have to take up the floorboards and look at the concepts of even the most ordinary piece of thinking. The great philosophers ... noticed how badly things were going wrong, and made suggestions about how they could be dealt with." Midgley argued that philosophy was not something that was reserved for intellectuals and academics. In her view, it is something we all do — an activity that is part of the human conditions.

=== Philosophy and religion ===
Despite her upbringing, she did not embrace Christianity herself, because, she says, "I couldn't make it work. I would try to pray and it didn't seem to get me anywhere so I stopped after a while. But I think it's a perfectly sensible world view." She also argues that the world's religions should not simply be ignored: "It turns out that the evils which have infested religion are not confined to it, but are ones that can accompany any successful human institution. Nor is it even clear that religion itself is something that the human race either can or should be cured of."

Midgley's book Wickedness (1984) has been described as coming "closest to addressing a theological theme: the problem of evil." But, Midgley argues that we need to understand the human capacity for wickedness, rather than blaming God for it. Midgley argues that evil arises from aspects of human nature, not from an external force. She further argues that evil is the absence of good, with good being described as the positive virtues such as generosity, courage and kindness. Therefore, evil is the absence of these characteristics, leading to selfishness, cowardice and similar. She therefore criticizes existentialism and other schools of thought which promote the 'Rational Will' as a free agent. She also criticizes the tendency to demonize those deemed 'wicked', by failing to acknowledge that they also display some measure of some of the virtues.

Midgley also expressed her interest in Paul Davies' ideas on the inherent improbability of the order found in the universe. She argued that "there's some sort of tendency towards the formation of order", including towards life and "perceptive life". The best way, she argued, of talking about this is using the concept of "a life force", although she acknowledged that this is "vague". She also argued that "gratitude" is an important part of the motivation for theism. "You go out on a day like this and you're really grateful. I don't know who to."

This understanding also links with Midgley's argument that the concept of Gaia has "both a scientific and a religious aspect." She argued that people find this hard to grasp because our views on both science and religion have been narrowed so much that the connections between them are now obscured. This is not, however, about belief in a personal God, but instead about responding to the system of life, as revealed by Gaia, with "wonder, awe and gratitude"

She observes that "practically all the great European philosophers have been bachelors", and argues that this may be responsible for the solipsism, skepticism, and individualism that dominate the tradition.

=== Gaia and philosophy ===
Midgley was supportive of James Lovelock's Gaia hypothesis. This was part of her "principal passion" of "reviving our reverence for the earth". Midgley also described Gaia as a "breakthrough", as it was "the first time a theory derived from scientific measurements has carried with it an implicit moral imperative – the need to act in the interests of this living system on which we all depend.

In 2001 Midgley founded, along with David Midgley and Tom Wakeford, the Gaia Network, and became its first Chair. Their regular meetings on the implications of Gaia led to the 2007 book Earthy realism edited by Midgley, which sought to bring together the scientific and spiritual aspects of Gaia theory.

Midgley's 2001 pamphlet for Demos, Gaia: The next big idea, argues for the importance of the idea of Gaia as a "powerful tool" in science, morality, psychology and politics, to gain a more holistic understanding of the world. Instead, Midgley argued that we "must learn how to value various aspects of our environment, how to structure social relationships and institutions so that we value social and spiritual life, as well as the natural world, alongside commercial and economic aspects.

Her book Science and Poetry, also published in 2001, also includes a discussion on the idea of Gaia, which she argued "is not a gratuitous, semi-mystical fantasy", but instead is "a useful idea, a cure for distortions that spoil our current world-view." It is useful both in finding practical solutions to environmental problems and also in giving us "a more realistic view of ourselves". Gaia has, Midgley argued, both scientific and moral importance, which also involves politics. There is also a religious angle to Gaia.

=== Reductionism and materialism ===
Beast and Man was an examination of human nature and a reaction against the reductionism of sociobiology, and the relativism and behaviorism she saw as prevalent in much of social science. She argued that human beings are more similar to animals than many social scientists then acknowledged, while animals are in many ways more sophisticated than was often accepted. She criticized existentialists who argued that there was no such thing as human nature and writers such as Desmond Morris who she understood as arguing that human nature was "brutal and nasty". Instead, she argued that human beings and their relationship with animals could be better understood by using the qualitative methods of ethology and comparative psychology, and that this approach showed that "we do have a nature and it's much more in the middle."

Writing in the 2002 introduction to the reprint of Evolution as a Religion (1985), Midgley reported that she wrote both this book, and the later Science as Salvation (1992) to counter the "quasi-scientific speculation" of "certain remarkable prophetic and metaphysical passages that appeared suddenly in scientific books, often in their last chapters." Evolution as a Religion dealt with the theories of evolutionary biologists, including Dawkins, while Science as Salvation dealt with the theories of physicists and artificial intelligence researchers. Midgley writes that she still believes that these theories, "have nothing to do with any reputable theory of evolution," and will not solve the real social and moral problems the world is facing, either through genetic engineering or the use of machines. She concludes: "These schemes still seem to me to be just displacement activities proposed in order to avoid facing our real difficulties." "[I]n exposing these rhetorical attempts to turn science into a comprehensive ideology," she wrote in The myths we live by, "I am not attacking science but defending it against dangerous misconstructions."

Midgley argued against reductionism, or the attempt to impose any one approach to understanding the world. She suggests that there are "many maps, many windows," arguing that "we need scientific pluralism—the recognition that there are many independent forms and sources of knowledge—rather than reductivism, the conviction that one fundamental form underlies them all and settles everything." She writes that it is helpful to think of the world as "a huge aquarium. We cannot see it as a whole from above, so we peer in at it through a number of small windows ... We can eventually make quite a lot of sense of this habitat if we patiently put together the data from different angles. But if we insist that our own window is the only one worth looking through, we shall not get very far."

She argued that, "acknowledging matter as somehow akin to and penetrated by mind is not adding a new ... assumption ... it is becoming aware of something we are doing already." She suggested that "this topic is essentially the one which caused Einstein often to remark that the really surprising thing about science is that it works at all ... the simple observation that the laws of thought turn out to be the laws of things."

Midgley wrote her 2014 book, Are you an illusion? as a response to Francis Crick's argument in his book The Astonishing Hypothesis that a person's sense of personal identity and free will is no more than the behaviour of nerve cells. She attacks the understanding inherent in this argument that everything, including a sense of self, can be understood through its physical properties. Instead, she argues that there are different levels of explanation, which need to be studied using different methods. This means that thoughts and memories are an integral part of reality for both humans and animals and need to be studied as such.

=== Midgley–Dawkins debate ===
In 1978, J. L. Mackie published an article entitled The Law of the Jungle: Moral Alternatives and Principles of Evolution, praising Dawkins's The Selfish Gene, and discussing how its ideas might be applied to moral philosophy. Midgley responded in 1979 with "Gene-Juggling", stating that Dawkins was an "uncritical philosophic egoist", followed by some far less kind opinions of his work, and arguing that the central point of The Selfish Gene was "that the emotional nature of man is exclusively self-interested", rather than a perspective of general evolution. In a 1981 rebuttal, Dawkins retorted that the comment was "hard to match, in reputable journals, for its patronising condescension toward a fellow academic".

The bad feeling between Dawkins and Midgley did not diminish. In a note to page 55 in the 2nd edition of The Selfish Gene (1989), Dawkins refers to her "highly intemperate and vicious paper". Midgley continued to oppose Dawkins' ideas. In her books Evolution as a Religion (2002) and The Myths We Live By (2003), she wrote about what she saw as his confused use of language — using terms such as "selfish" in different ways without alerting the reader to the change in meaning—and some of what she regarded as his rhetoric ("genes exert ultimate power over behaviour"), which she argued is more akin to religion than science. She wrote in a letter to The Guardian in 2005:

[There is] widespread discontent with the neo-Darwinist—or Dawkinsist—orthodoxy that claims something which Darwin himself denied, namely that natural selection is the sole and exclusive cause of evolution, making the world therefore, in some important sense, entirely random. This is itself a strange faith which ought not to be taken for granted as part of science.

In an interview with The Independent in September 2007, she argued that Dawkins' views on evolution are ideologically driven: "The ideology Dawkins is selling is the worship of competition. It is projecting a Thatcherite take on economics on to evolution. It's not an impartial scientific view; it's a political drama." In April 2009 Midgley reiterated her critical interpretation of The Selfish Gene as part of a series of articles on Hobbes in The Guardian. In her 2010 book The Solitary Self: Darwin and the Selfish Gene, she argues that "simple one-sided accounts of human motives, such as the "selfish gene" tendency in recent neo-Darwinian thought, may be illuminating but are always unrealistic".

== Midgley in art ==
Midgley is referred to in The Lives of Animals (1999), a work of fiction by the South African novelist J. M. Coetzee. The book has been likened to a cross between a short story and a philosophical dialogue, as Coetzee's protagonist, Elizabeth Costello, often speaks at length about philosophical ideas. Many reviewers expressed bafflement at the text, which has an enigmatic and riddling style. As one reviewer noted, "the reader is not quite sure whether he is intended to spot some confusion or contradiction or non-sequitur in [the protagonist's] arguments." Other critics however have noted many affinities between The Lives of Animals and Midgley's philosophy, and have used Midgley's ideas to make sense of Coetzee's work.

The main character, who also appears in Coetzee's novel Elizabeth Costello, is concerned with the moral status of animals, a subject Midgley addressed in Animals and Why They Matter, and discusses at length the idea of sympathy as an ethical concept, a subject Midgley wrote about in Beast and Man. Andy Lamey wrote that the result of these and other similarities is that Coetzee's work "evoke[s] a particular conception of ethics, one very similar to that of the philosopher Mary Midgley. Such a view affords a central role to sympathy and is fundamentally opposed to a long-standing rival view, most clearly exemplified by the social contract tradition, which prioritizes an instrumental conception of rationality."

Coetzee and Midgley additionally shared a longstanding fascination with Robinson Crusoe. Coetzee retells the Crusoe story in his novel Foe, while Midgley wrote about Crusoe in her essay "Duties Concerning Islands." Midgley's essay argued for the idea that human beings can have ethical obligations to non-human entities such as animals and ecosystems, an idea also found in The Lives of Animals, Foe and many other works by Coetzee.

Midgley agreed to sit for sculptor Jon Edgar in Newcastle during 2006, as part of the Environment Triptych, along with heads of Richard Mabey and James Lovelock. This was exhibited at Yorkshire Sculpture Park in 2013.

== Publications ==
Books

- Beast and Man: The Roots of Human Nature. Routledge, 1978; revised edition 1995. ISBN 0-415-28987-4
- Heart and Mind: The Varieties of Moral Experience. Routledge, 1981. ISBN 0-415-30449-0
- Animals and Why They Matter: A Journey Around the Species Barrier. University of Georgia Press, 1983. ISBN 0-8203-2041-2
- Wickedness: A Philosophical Essay. Routledge, 1984. ISBN 0-415-25398-5
- with Judith Hughes. Women's Choices: Philosophical Problems Facing Feminism. Weidenfeld and Nicolson, 1983. ISBN 0-312-88791-4
- Evolution as a Religion: Strange Hopes and Stranger Fears. Routledge, 1985; reprinted with new introduction 2002. ISBN 0-415-27832-5 This is dedicated "to the memory of Charles Darwin who never said these things."
- Can't We Make Moral Judgements?. Bristol Press, 1989. ISBN 1-85399-166-X
- Wisdom, Information and Wonder: What Is Knowledge For?. Routledge, 1989. ISBN 0-415-02830-2
- Science As Salvation: A Modern Myth and Its Meaning. Routledge, 1992. ISBN 0-415-10773-3 (also available here as a Gifford Lectures series)
- The Ethical Primate: Humans, Freedom and Morality. Routledge, 1994. ISBN 0-415-13224-X
- Utopias, Dolphins and Computers: Problems of Philosophical Plumbing. Routledge, 1996. ISBN 0-415-13378-5
- Science And Poetry. Routledge, 2001. ISBN 0-415-27632-2
- Myths We Live By. Routledge, 2003. ISBN 0-415-34077-2
- The Owl of Minerva: A Memoir. Routledge, 2005. ISBN 0-415-36788-3 (Midgley's autobiography)
- Earthy Realism: The Meaning of Gaia. Imprint Academic, 2007. ISBN 1-84540-080-1 (editor)
- The Solitary Self: Darwin and the Selfish Gene. Acumen, 2010. ISBN 978-1-84465-253-2
- Are you an Illusion?. Acumen, 2014. ISBN 978-1844657926
- What Is Philosophy For?. Bloomsbury, 2018. ISBN 978-1350051072

Pamphlets

- Biological and Cultural Evolution, Institute for Cultural Research Monograph Series, No. 20, 1984. ISBN 0-904674-08-8
- Gaia: The Next Big Idea, Demos publications, 2001. ISBN 1-84180-075-9
- Impact Pamphlet 15: Intelligent Design and Other Ideological Problems, 2007. ISBN 0-902227-17-3

Selected articles

- The Emancipation of Women (1952) The Twentieth Century CLII, No. 901, pp. 217–25
- Bishop Butler: A Reply (1952) The Twentieth Century CLII, No. 905
- Ou Sont les Neiges de ma Tante (1959) The Twentieth Century, pp. 168–79
- Is "Moral" Dirty Word? (1972) Philosophy 47, No 181, pp. 206–228 JSTOR 3750150
- The Concept of Beastliness: Philosophy, Ethics and Animal Behaviour (1973) Philosophy 48, No. 148, pp. 111–135 JSTOR 3749836
- The Neutrality of the Moral Philosopher (1974) Supplementary Volume of the Aristotelian Society, pp. 211–29 JSTOR 4544857
- The Game Game (1974) Philosophy 49, No. 189, pp. 231–253 JSTOR 3750115
- On Trying Out One's New Sword on a Chance Wayfarer (1977) The Listener (Reprinted in Midgley, Mary Heart and Mind (1981) and MacKinnon, Barbara Ethics, Theory and Contemporary Issues (Third Edition 2001))
- More about Reason, Commitment and Social Anthropology (1978) Philosophy 53, No. 205, pp. 401–403 JSTOR 3749907
- The Objection to Systematic Humbug (1978) Philosophy 53, No. 204, pp. 147–169 JSTOR 3749425
- Freedom and Heredity (1978) The Listener (Reprinted in Midgley, Mary Heart and Mind (1981))
- Brutality and Sentimentality (1979) Philosophy 54, No. 209, pp. 385–389 JSTOR 3750611
- The All-Female Number (1979) Philosophy 54 No. 210, pp. 552–554 JSTOR 3751049
- Gene-Juggling (1979) Philosophy 54, No. 210, pp. 439–458 JSTOR 3751039
- The Absence of a Gap between Facts and Values (with Stephen R. L. Clark) (1980) Proceedings of the Aristotelian Society, Supplementary Volumes 54, pp. 207–223+225-240 JSTOR 4106784
- Consequentialism and Common Sense (1980) The Hastings Center Report 10, No. 5, pp. 43–44 doi:10.2307/3561052
- Why Knowledge Matters (1981) Animals in Research: New Perspectives in Animal Experimentation ed. David Sperling
- Human Ideals and Human Needs (1983) Philosophy 58, No. 223, pp. 89–94 JSTOR 3750521
- Towards a New Understanding of Human Nature: The Limits of Individualism (1983) How Humans Adapt: A Biocultural Odyssey ed. Donald J. Ortner
- Selfish Genes and Social Darwinism (1983) Philosophy 58, No. 225, pp. 365–377 JSTOR 3750771
- Duties Concerning Islands (1983) Encounter LX (Reprinted in People, Penguins and Plastic Trees (1986) ed. Donald Vandeveer also in Ethics (1994) ed. Peter Singer and Environmental Ethics (1995) ed. Robert Elliot)
- De-Dramatizing Darwin (1984) The Monist 67, No. 2
- Persons and Non-Persons (1985) In Defense of Animals, pp. 52–62
- Can Specialist Damage Your Health? (1987) International Journal of Moral and Social Studies 2, No. 1
- Keeping Species on Ice (1987) Beyond the Bars: the Zoo Dilemma ed.Virginia MacKenna, Will Travers and Jonathan Wray
- The Flight from Blame (1987) Philosophy 62, No. 241, pp. 271–291 JSTOR 3750837
- Evolution As A Religion: A Comparison of Prophecies (1987) Zygon 22, No. 2, pp. 179–194 doi:10.1111/j.1467-9744.1987.tb00845.x
- Embarrassing Relatives: Changing Perceptions of Animals (1987) The Trumpter 4, No. 4, pp. 17–19
- Beasts, Brutes and Monsters (1988) What Is An Animal? ed. Tim Ingold
- Teleological Theories of Morality (1988) An Encyclopaedia of Philosophy ed. G.H.R. Parkinson
- On Not Being afraid of Natural Sex Differences (1988) Feminist Perspectives in Philosophy ed. Morwenna Griffiths and Margaret Whitford
- Practical Solutions (1988) The Hastings Center Report 19, No. 6, pp. 44–45 doi:10.2307/3561992
- Myths of Intellectual Isolation (1988–89) Proceedings of the Aristotelian Society LXXXIX, Part 1
- The Value of "Useless" Research: Supporting Scholarship for the Long Run (1989) Report by the Council for Science and Society
- Are You an Animal? (1989) Animal Experimentation: The Consensus Changes ed. Gill Langley
- Why Smartness is Not Enough (1990) Rethinking the Curriculum; Towards an Integrated, Interdisciplinary College Education ed. Mary E. Clark and Sandra A. Wawritko
- Homunculus Trouble, or, What is Applied Philosophy? (1990) Journal of Social Philosophy 21, No. 1, pp. 5–15 doi:10.1111/j.1467-9833.1990.tb00262.x
- The Use and Uselessness of Learning (1990) European Journal of Education 25, No.3, pp. 283–294 doi:10.2307/1503318
- Rights-Talk Will Not Sort Out Child-abuse; Comment on Archard on Parental Rights (1991) Journal of Applied Philosophy 8, No. 1 doi:10.1111/j.1468-5930.1991.tb00411.x
- The Origin of Ethics (1991) A Companion To Ethics ed. Peter Singer (Available in Spanish here)
- Is the Biosphere a Luxury? (1992) The Hastings Center Report 22, No. 3, pp. 7–12 doi:10.2307/3563291
- Towards a More Humane View of the Beasts? (1992) The Environment in Question ed. David E. Cooper and Joy A. Palmer
- The Significance of Species (1992) The Moral Life ed. Stephen Luper-Foy and Curtis Brown (Reprinted in The Animal Rights/ Environmental Ethics Debate, The Environmental Perspective (1992) ed. Eugene C. Hargrove)
- Strange Contest, Science versus Religion (1992) The Gospel and Contemporary Culture ed. Hugh Montefiore
- Philosophical Plumbing (1992) The Impulse to Philosophise ed. A. Phillips Griffiths
- The idea of Salvation Through Science (1992) New Blackfriars 73, No. 860, pp. 257–265 doi:10.1111/j.1741-2005.1992.tb07240.x
- Can Science Save its Soul (1992) New Scientist, pp. 43–6
- Beasts versus the Biosphere (1992) Environmental Values 1, No. 1, pp. 113–21
- The Four-Leggeds, The Two-Leggeds and the Wingeds (1993) Society and Animals 1, No. 1.
- Visions, Secular and Sacred (1994) Milltown Studies 34, pp. 74–93
- The End of Anthropocentrism? (1994) Philosophy and the Natural Environment ed. Robin Attfield and Andrew Belsey
- Darwinism and Ethics (1994) Medicine and Moral Reasoning ed. K.W.M. Fulford, Grant Gillett and Janet Martin Soskice
- Bridge-Building at Last (1994) Animals and Human Society ed. Aubrey Manning and James Serpell
- Zombies and the Turing Test (1995) Journal of Consciousness Studies 2, No. 4, pp. 351–2
- Reductive Megalomania (1995) Nature's Imagination; The Frontiers of Scientific Vision ed. John Cornwall
- Trouble with Families? (1995) Introducing Applied Ethics ed. Brenda Almond (Joint with Judith Hughes)
- The Challenge of Science, Limited Knowledge, or a New High Priesthood? (1995) True to this Earth ed. Alan Race and Roger Williamson
- The Mixed Community (1995) Earth Ethics, Environmental Ethics, Animal Rights and Practical Applications ed. James P. Serba
- Visions, Secular and Sacred (1995) The Hastings Center Report 25, No. 5, pp. 20–27 doi:10.2307/3562790
- Darwin's Central Problems (1995) Science 268, No. 5214, pp. 1196–1198 doi:10.1126/science.268.5214.1196
- The Ethical Primate. Anthony Freeman in discussion with Mary Midgley (1995) Journal of Consciousness Studies 2, No. 1, pp. 67–75(9) (Joint with Anthony Freeman)
- Sustainability and Moral Pluralism (1996) Ethics and The Environment 1, No. 1
- One World – But a Big One (1996) Journal of Consciousness Studies 3, No. 5/6
- Earth Matters; Thinking about the Environment (1996) The Age of Anxiety ed. Sarah Dunant and Roy Porter
- The View from Britain: What is Dissolving Families? (1996) American Philosophical Association, Newsletter on Feminism and Philosophy 96, No. 1 (Joint with Judith Hughes)
- Can Education be Moral? (1996) Res Publica II, No. 1 doi:10.1007/BF02335711 (Reprinted in Teaching Right and Wrong, Moral Education in the Balance ed Richard Smith and Paul Standish)
- Science in the World (1996) Science Studies 9, No. 2
- The Myths We Live By (1996) The Values of Science Oxford Amnesty Lectures ed Wes Williams
- Visions of Embattled Science (1997) Science Today: Problem or Crisis? ed Ralph Levinson and Jeff Thomas
- The Soul's Successors: Philosophy and the "Body" (1997) Religion and the Body ed Sarah Coakley
- Putting Ourselves Together Again (1998) Consciousness and Human Human Identity ed John Cornwall
- Monkey business. The Origin of Species changed man's conception of himself forever. So why, asks Mary Midgley, is Darwinism used to reinforce the arid individualism of our age? (1999) New Statesman
- The Problem of Humbug (1998) Media Ethics ed Matthew Kieram
- Descartes' prisoners (1999) New Statesman
- Being Scientific about Our Selves (1999) Journal of Consciousness Studies, 6 (Reprinted in Models of the Self (1999) ed Shaun Gallagher and Jonathan Shear)
- Towards an Ethic of Global Responsibility (1999) Human Rights in Global Politics ed Tim Dunne and Nicholas J. Wheeler
- The Origins of Don Giovanni (1999–2000) Philosophy Now, p. 32
- Alchemy Revived (2000) The Hastings Center Report 30, No. 2, pp. 41–43 doi:10.2307/3528314
- Biotechnology and Monstrosity: Why We Should Pay Attention to the "Yuk Factor" (2000) The Hastings Center Report 30, No. 5, pp. 7–15 doi:10.2307/3527881
- Earth Song (2000) New Statesman
- Both nice and nasty (2000) New Statesman
- Individualism and the Concept of Gaia (2000) Review of International Studies 26, pp. 29–44
- Consciousness, Fatalism and Science (2000) The Human Person in Science and Theology ed Niels Hendrik Gregerson, Willem B. Drees and Ulf Gorman
- Human Nature, Human Variety, Human Freedom (2000) Being Humans: Anthropological Universality and Particularity ed Neil Roughley
- Why Memes? (2000) Alas, Poor Darwin ed Hukary and Steven Rose
- The Need for Wonder Archived 30 May 2008 at the Wayback Machine (2000) God for the 21st Century ed Russell Stannard
- What Gaia Means (2001) The Guardian
- The bankers' abstract vision of the globe is limited (2001) The Guardian
- The Problem of Living with Wildness (2001) Wolves and Human Communities: Biology, Politics and Ethics ed Virginia A. Sharpe, Bryan Norton and Strachan Donelley
- Wickedness (2001) The Philosophers' Magazine pp. 23–5
- Being Objective (2001) Nature 410, p. 753 doi:10.1038/35071193
- Heaven and Earth, an Awkward History (2001–2002) Philosophy Now 34 p. 18
- Does the Earth Concern Us? (2001–2002) Gaia Circular, p. 4
- Choosing the Selectors (2002) Proceedings of the British Academy 112 published as The Evolution of Cultural Entities ed Michael Wheeler, John Ziman and Margaret A. Boden
- Pluralism: The Many-Maps Model (2002) Philosophy Now 35
- How real are you? (2002) Think. A Periodical of the Royal Institute of Philosophy
- Reply to target article: "Inventing the Subject; the Renewal of 'Psychological' Psychology" (2002) Journal of Anthropological Psychology
- Enough is never enough (2002) The Guardian
- It's all in the mind (2002) The Guardian
- Science and Poetry (2003) Situation Analysis 2 (edited extract from Chapters 17 Individualism and the Concept of Gaia and 18 Gods and Goddesses; the Role of Wonder of Science and Poetry)
- Great Thinkers – James Lovelock (2003) New Statesman
- Curiouser and curiouser (2003) The Guardian
- Fate by fluke (2003) The Guardian
- Criticising the Cosmos (2003) Is Nature Ever Evil? Religion, Science and Value ed Willem B. Drees
- Zombies (2003–2004) Philosophy Now pp. 13–14
- Souls, Minds, Bodies, Planets pt1 and pt2 (2004) Two-part article on the Mind Body problem Philosophy Now
- Us and Them (2004) New Statesman
- Counting the cost of revenge (2004) The Guardian
- Mind and Body: The End of Apartheid (2004) Science, Consciousness and Ultimate Reality ed David Lorimer
- Why Clones? (2004) Scientific and Medical Network Review, No. 84
- Visions and Values (2005) Resurgence 228
- Proud not to be a doctor (2005) The Guardian
- Designs on Darwinism (2005) The Guardian
- Review: The God Delusion by Richard Dawkins (2006) New Scientist Issue 2572 doi:10.1016/S0262-4079(06)60674-X
- Rethinking sex and the selfish gene: why we do it (2006) Heredity 96, No. 3, pp. 271–2 doi:10.1038/sj.hdy.6800798
- A Plague On Both Their Houses (2007) Philosophy Now 64
- Mary Midgley on Dawkins (2007) Interlog
- Does Science Make God Obsolete? (2008) John Templeton Foundation
- The Master and His Emissary: The Divided Brain and the Making of the Western World by Iain McGilchrist (2010) The Guardian

== See also ==
- List of animal rights advocates
