= Wayland Young, 2nd Baron Kennet =

British writer and politician (1923–2009)

The Right Honourable The Lord Kennet
- Kennet in 1967, by Walter Bird

Member of the House of Lords Lord Temporal
- In office 11 July 1960 – 11 November 1999 as a hereditary peer
- Preceded by: The 1st Baron Kennet
- Succeeded by: Seat abolished

Personal details
- Born: 2 August 1923
- Died: 7 May 2009 (aged 85)
- Party: Labour (1956–81; 1990–99); SDP (1981–88) "Continuing" SDP (1988–90); Liberal Democrats (2000s)
- Spouse: Elizabeth Adams
- Children: 6, including Emily and Louisa Young
- Parent(s): Hilton Young, 1st Baron Kennet; Kathleen Scott
- Relatives: Sir Peter Scott (half-brother)
- Education: Trinity College, Cambridge

Wayland Hilton Young, 2nd Baron Kennet (2 August 1923 – 7 May 2009) was a British writer and politician, notably concerned with planning and conservation. As a Labour minister, he was responsible for setting up the Department of the Environment and the Royal Commission on Environmental Pollution. Later he joined the SDP. He lost his seat in the Lords following the House of Lords Act 1999.

== Early life ==
Young was the son of the politician Hilton Young, 1st Baron Kennet, and the sculptor Kathleen Scott, née Bruce, widow of Captain Robert Falcon Scott of the Antarctic. One uncle was Geoffrey Winthrop Young, the mountaineer. His half-brother was the painter and conservationist Sir Peter Scott. After West Downs School, he spent one unhappy term at Winchester College before going on to Alpine College, Stowe School and finally as an Exhibitioner at Trinity College, Cambridge. During World War II, he served in the Royal Navy from 1942 to 1945, as an Ordinary Seaman and as Sublieutenant. He then went on to the Foreign Office serving between 1946 and 1947 and 1949–1951.

In between and after, Young was a journalist – Observer correspondent in Rome and North Africa, and weekly columnist on The Guardian ("Sitting on a Column"), and theatre critic for Tribune. He was a frequent contributor to Encounter, where his articles were widely noticed – among them "Sitting on a Fortune" (about prostitution) and a review showing up many errors of fact in Roland Huntford's book on Scott and Amundsen, which denigrated the former (ignoring the scientific character of Scott's expedition), and presented the event as merely a "race" that the latter "won".

Young also wrote three novels, and several pamphlets for the Fabian Society on defence, disarmament, pollution, Europe and other topics, some with his wife, Elizabeth Young. Together they also wrote a book, Old London Churches (which identified the six churches designed by Nicholas Hawksmoor as works of real genius). Young also took part in the Campaign for the Abolition of Theatre Censorship as its Secretary. His energetic interest in disarmament did not lead him to join the Campaign for Nuclear Disarmament – it worked for unilateral British nuclear disarmament: he believed that only general and comprehensive disarmament could be useful and effective.

== Political career ==
Young succeeded to the title of Baron Kennet, and took his seat in the House of Lords in 1960 upon the death of his father. He started his political career in the Labour Party, having joined in opposition to the Suez Crisis in 1956. He served as Parliamentary Secretary (Junior Minister) in the Ministry of Housing and Local Government (under Richard Crossman, then later Anthony Greenwood) where he worked, among much else, on planning and conservation, and on devising the soon-to-be-set up Department of the Environment (Secretary of State, Tony Crosland) He was responsible for setting up the Royal Commission on Environmental Pollution. According to his 1972 publication Preservation he worked on setting up the "Four Towns Report" and played an important role in establishing the foundations of conservation policy through the Town and Country Planning Act 1968 and his 1970 Kennet Report. After the fall of the [first] Wilson Government in 1970, he was appointed Honorary Fellow of the Royal Institute of British Architects, and became Chairman of the Council for the Protection of Rural England, of the Advisory Committee on Pollution of the Sea (ACOPS), and various other organisations. He served as Opposition Spokesman on Foreign Affairs in the House of Lords from 1971 to 1974. He was also a member of the European Parliament, of the Western European Union, and a NATO Parliamentarian.

Kennet joined the SDP, serving as Chief Whip of the party in the House of Lords between 1981 and 1983. While in that position, he introduced a bill for the Prohibition of Female Circumcision; it passed on 16 July 1985. Following the decision by the party's membership to merge with the Liberal Party in 1988, Kennet was one of the minority who instead opted to remain with the "continuing" SDP faction, led by David Owen. He returned to the Labour Party in 1990, soon after the "continuing" SDP folded, before leaving in opposition to Tony Blair's foreign policy. Under the terms of the House of Lords Act 1999, he lost his automatic right to a seat; he was unsuccessful in the election by the Labour hereditary peers of two of their number to continue to sit after the coming into force of the Act, finishing last in a field of six candidates.

In 2005, he sought to return to the House in the by-election among Liberal Democrat hereditary peers caused by the death of Earl Russell; he was unsuccessful, receiving no votes.

Until late in life he remained chairman of the Stonehenge Alliance, and an active member of the Avebury Society and Action for the River Kennet (ARK).

== Personal life ==
Lord Kennet married Elizabeth Ann Adams in 1948. They had a son, William Aldus (Thoby) Young, and five daughters: Easter Russell, educationalist; the sculptor Emily Young; Mopsa English, educationalist; and the writers Louisa Young (aka children's author Zizou Corder) and Zoe Young.

Emily, described as an enigmatic and modish teenager in the 1960s, was the probable inspiration for the Pink Floyd song "See Emily Play".

The family homes were in Bayswater and in Wiltshire, where in 1908 Young's father had bought The Lacket, an 18th-century thatched cottage on the edge of the village of Lockeridge, near Marlborough.

== Works ==
Young published on a wide range of mostly political topics, especially on the politics of Italy, on disarmament and arms control, on the churches of London often collaborating with his wife Elizabeth Young, and on various political scandals, notably the Profumo affair and the Montesi scandal. His 1964 work Eros Denied was a groundbreaking manifesto of the sexual revolution. Young's 1972 publication Preservation is an important insight of present UK conservation and preservation laws and policies, through the conservation struggles of the late 19th century until the 1968 Planning Act.

=== Bibliography ===
- The Italian Left: A Short History of Political Socialism in Italy, London: Longman, Green & Co., 1949
- The Deadweight, London: The Cresset Press, 1952
- Now or Never, London: The Cresset Press, 1953
- Old London Churches (with Elizabeth Young), London: Faber & Faber, 1956
- The Montesi Scandal: The Story of the Famous Murder That Rocked Modern Italy, London: Faber & Faber, 1957
- Still Alive Tomorrow, London: Hamilton & Co., 1958 (reprinted Panther, 1960)
- The Socialist Imagination (with Elizabeth Young), Fabian Society, 1960 (pamphlet)
- Disarmament: Finnegan's Choice (with Elizabeth Young), Fabian Society, 1961 (pamphlet)
- Gogol's Wife & Other Stories (translator of work by Tommaso Landolfi; with Raymond Rosenthal, John Longrigg), Norfolk, Connecticut: New Directions, 1963.
- Strategy for Survival, First steps in nuclear disarmament, London: Penguin Special, 1959
- The Profumo Affair: Aspects of Conservatism, London: Penguin, 1963
- Bombs and Votes, Fabian Society, 1964 (pamphlet)
- Eros Denied: Sex in Western Society, New York: Grove Press, 1964 (other editions are subtitled "Studies in Exclusion")
- Preservation, London: Maurice Temple Smith, 1972
- Still no disarmament, Fabian Society, 1973 (pamphlet)
- The Futures of Europe, Cambridge University Press, 1976
- Kennet, Wayland. "Disarmament: Thirty Years of Failure." Conspectus of History 1.5 (1978): 1-15.
- The Rebirth of Britain (editor), London: Weidenfeld & Nicolson, 1982
- Prohibition of Female Circumcision Act 1985, introduced 2 March 1983, statuted 16 July 1985.
- London's Churches: A Visitor's Companion (with Elizabeth Young), London: Grafton Books, 1986, ISBN 0-88162-212-5
- Northern Lazio: An Unknown Italy (with Elizabeth Young), London: John Murray, 1990, ISBN 0-7195-4643-5

== Arms ==
Coat of arms of Wayland Young, 2nd Baron Kennet
Crest A demi-unicorn couped Ermine, armed, maned, and hoofed Or, gorged with a naval crown Azure supporting an anchor erect Sable. Escutcheon Per fesse Sable and Argent: in chief two lions rampant-guardant, and in base an anchor erect with a cable, all counterchanged. Motto In College Domus (A House on a Hill)

== Footnotes ==
Peerage of the United Kingdom
Preceded by Hilton Young	Baron Kennet; 1960–2009; Member of the House of Lords (1960–1999)	Succeeded by William Young
