= List of Old Oundelians =

The following is a list of some notable Old Oundelians, alumni of Oundle School in Northamptonshire, England:

== Armed forces ==
- Air Vice Marshal David Atcherley, senior Royal Air Force officer
- Major-General Llewellyn William Atcherley, British army officer and Chief Constable of West Yorkshire Constabulary
- Air Marshal Sir Richard Atcherley, senior Royal Air Force officer. He served as Commander-in-Chief of the Royal Pakistan Air Force between 1949 and 1951
- Bernard Beanlands, Canadian World War I flying ace credited with eight aerial victories
- Patrick Beesly, wartime intelligence officer and author
- James Bradley, prisoner-of-war of the Japanese during World War II
- Rear Admiral Benjamin Bryant CB DSO** DSC, the most successful British submarine ace to survive the war
- Count Manfred Beckett Czernin, World War II Royal Air Force Pilot and later in the war an operative with the Special Operations Executive
- Denis Eadie MC, British Army officer who was awarded the Military Cross by Field Marshal Lord Wavell for his conduct during the relief of Kohima
- Gerald Edge, British World War II flying ace credited with 20 aerial victories
- Wing Commander Patrick Gibbs, RAF pilot and journalist
- Alan Jerrard VC, recipient of the Victoria Cross for action during the Great War
- Norman Jewell, World War II Royal Navy officer
- Cecil Knox VC, recipient of the Victoria Cross for action during the Great War
- John Langdon, Royal Marine officer at D-Day, later became an Anglican priest
- William Howard Livens, soldier and inventor
- Sir Rhys Llewellyn, 2nd Baronet, soldier and mining executive
- General Sir Richard Shireff, British army officer and former Deputy Supreme Allied Commander Europe
- Air Marshal Sir Charles Steele, former Commander-in-Chief of RAF Coastal Command
- Sir (Charles) Geoffrey Vickers VC, lawyer, administrator, writer and pioneering systems scientist
- Vice Admiral Sir John Michael Villiers, Royal Navy officer and Fourth Sea Lord
- General Sir Charles John Waters, former Commander-in-Chief, Land Forces
- Harold Whistler, fighter pilot and flying ace
- Air Commodore John Whitworth, Royal Air Force pilot in the 1930s and a commander during and after the Second World War
- Sir Charles Rodger Winn, Royal Navy intelligence officer and judge
- Major General Sir John Winterton, Governor and Commander of Trieste
- Captain William Wright, WW1 flying ace and civil servant
- Michael Wynn, 7th Baron Newborough, Royal Navy officer

== Arts ==
- Christopher Alexander, architect, academic and author
- Al Alvarez, poet
- John Davys Beresford, author
- Peter Bicknell, architect and art historian
- George Blagden, actor, singer
- Michael Broadbent MW, wine critic and auctioneer
- Lucy Brown, actress
- Thomas Carr, artist
- Allan Chappelow, writer and photographer
- Joanna Christie, actress
- Jim Clark, Academy Award-winning film editor
- Peter J. Conradi, writer and academic
- Charles Crichton, film director
- Bruce Dickinson, lead singer in the band Iron Maiden, commercial pilot, fencer
- John Dreyfus, book designer and historian of printing
- David Edgar, playwright
- John Maxwell Edmonds, poet, dramatist and writer of celebrated epitaphs
- Adrian Fisher, maze designer
- Colin Franklin, writer, bibliographer, book-collector and antiquarian bookseller
- Roderick Gordon, author
- Anthony Holden, biographer
- Maxwell Hutchinson, architect, broadcaster and former President of the Royal Institute of British Architects (RIBA)
- Fred Inglis, professor of Cultural Studies
- Christopher Joll, historian and author
- Jon Jones, BAFTA winning film and television director
- Frederick Knott, playwright
- Andrew Pettegree, historian and professor at St Andrews University
- David Pickering, writer
- George Sassoon, writer
- Sir Peter Saunders, theatrical impresario
- Sir Peter Scott, conservationist and painter
- Paul Seabright, academic and writer
- Keith Shackleton, conservationist and painter
- Judge Smith, musician, Van der Graaf Generator
- Robert Speechly, architect
- John Charles Traylen, architect
- Kenneth Hotham Vickers, historian
- Bill Ward, actor
- Ivo Watts-Russell, music producer, president 4AD Records
- Thomas Wide, historian, author, and entrepreneur
- Sir Bertram Clough Williams-Ellis, architect, designer of Portmeirion
- Martin Woodhouse, author and scriptwriter

== Business and finance ==
- John Allwood, businessman
- Alex Baldock, businessman, banker, CEO of Currys
- Alan Budd, economist
- Geoffrey Crowther, Baron Crowther, businessman, economist and journalist
- David Fleming, economist and environmental writer
- Sir Roland Franklin, Antigua and Barbuda-based merchant banker
- Jason Gissing, entrepreneur, co-founder of Ocado Group
- Colin Matthews, businessman and Chairman of Highways England
- Sir David Newbigging, businessman and Hong Kong politician
- Nazir Razak, banker
- Sir Howard Stringer, chairman and CEO Sony Corporation
- Sir John Timpson, founder of British retailer Timpson
- John Ward, economist and trade union leader
- James Kenneth Weir, peer and businessman

== Engineering ==
- Tony Blackman, aviator and test pilot for Avro
- James Boyd (1904–1987), American mining engineer and director of the United States Bureau of Mines; did not graduate
- Major Patrick Hunter Gordon, soldier and electrical engineer
- Sir Richard O'Brien, engineer and industrial relations expert
- Raymond Mays, racing driver, engineer and entrepreneur, co-founder of ERA and BRM
- Kenyon Taylor, electrical engineer and inventor
- Amherst Villiers, engineer (automotive, aeronautical, astronautical), portrait painter
- Rex Wailes, engineer and historian

== Media ==
- Barrie Edgar, TV producer
- Damian Grammaticas, BBC Europe Correspondent
- Cecil Lewis, co-founder of the BBC, flying ace and author of 'Sagittarius Rising'
- David Loyn, International Development Correspondent of BBC News
- Arthur Marshall, writer and broadcaster
- Rufus Pollock, economist and founder of Open Knowledge International
- Norman Smith, Assistant Political Editor of BBC News
- Charles Wintour, newspaper editor

== Politics, civil service and the law ==
- Baron Allan of Hallam, Liberal Democrat M.P.
- Major Basil Barton, solicitor and M.P.
- Michael Beaumont, Conservative M.P.
- Sir Roy Beldam, Lord Justice of Appeal
- Caroline Criado Perez, feminist campaigner and writer
- Robert Dixon-Smith, Baron Dixon-Smith, Conservative M.P.
- Frederick Erroll, 1st Baron Erroll of Hale, Conservative M.P.
- Ailwyn Fellowes, 3rd Baron de Ramsey, peer and Lord-lieutenant of Huntingdonshire
- Charles Finch-Knightley, 11th Earl of Aylesford, peer styled "Lord Guernsey", Justice of the peace and Deputy lieutenant for Warwickshire
- Gary Flather, judge and disability campaigner
- Abraham Flint, barrister and judge
- Donald Gorrie, Scottish Liberal Democrat M.P. and former M.S.P. for Central Scotland
- John Grimston, 6th Earl of Verulam, peer and M.P.
- John Hanscomb, politician
- Denis Keegan, barrister and M.P.
- Alastair John Naisbitt King, Financier and 696th Lord Mayor of London
- David Kitchin, Lord Kitchin, UK Supreme Court Justice
- Owen Lloyd George, 3rd Earl Lloyd-George of Dwyfor, peer
- Sir William Laxton, Lord Mayor of London, grocer and school founder
- Sir William Montagu, judge
- Michael Mustill, Baron Mustill, Law Lord
- Mark Ormerod, civil servant and chief executive of The Supreme Court of the United Kingdom
- Sir Herbert Palmer, Governor of Gambia and Cyprus
- Ralph Bonner Pink, Conservative M.P.
- Christian Herbert, 6th Earl of Powis
- James Provan, farmer, businessman and M.E.P.
- Janil Puthucheary, Malaysian-born Singaporean politician and paediatrician
- David Reddaway, diplomat
- David Lockhart-Mure Renton, Baron Renton, Conservative M.P.
- Sir David Richards, UK Supreme Court Justice
- John Vernon Rob, diplomat and first High Commissioner to Singapore
- The Rt. Hon. Kenneth Robinson, Labour M.P. and Minister of Health 1964-1968
- Sir Colin Shepherd, Conservative M.P.
- Sir Joseph Simpson, Metropolitan Police commissioner
- Michael Tatham, diplomat
- Peter Thurnham, Conservative and Liberal Democrat M.P.
- Prince Tomislav of Yugoslavia
- Sir George Mark Waller, judge and former Lord Justice of Appeal
- Arthur Wynn, civil servant and recruiter of Soviet spies, known as "Agent Scott"

== Science, medicine and religion ==
- Michael Ashby, neurologist, witness in John Bodkin Adams case
- David Barker, epidemiologist
- Colin Bibby, ornithologist and conservationist
- Sir Cyril Clarke, physician
- Richard Dawkins, ethologist, evolutionary biologist and science writer
- George Dawson Preston, physicist and crystallographer
- William Dillingham, clergyman and academic
- Charles Fagge, surgeon
- Hartley T. Ferrar, geologist who accompanied Captain Scott's First Antarctic Expedition
- Alister Hardy, marine biologist
- John B. Harman, former chairman of the British National Formulary
- Leslie Hilton Brown, ornithologist and agriculturalist
- Hugh Jackson, paediatrician
- Richard Keynes, physiologist
- Stephen Keynes, chairman of the Charles Darwin Trust
- Milo Keynes, doctor and author
- Thomas Layng, clergyman and soldier
- Alan Lindsay Mackay, crystallographer
- Bobby Milburn, clergyman
- Clive Minton, ornithologist
- David Nabarro, senior UN system coordinator
- C. H. Nash, clergyman and founder of the Melbourne Bible Institute
- Joseph Needham, biochemist
- Guy Newton, biochemist and rower
- Robin Nicholson, metallurgist, Chief Scientific Advisor to cabinet
- David Oates, archaeologist and Ancient Near East specialist
- P. D. Orton, mycologist
- Derek Richter, neuroscientist
- John Smith, clergyman and philosopher, one of the Cambridge Platonists
- John Speechly, bishop
- Simon Tavaré, founding director of the Herbert and Florence Irving Institute of Cancer Dynamics
- Ronald F. Tylecote, archaeologist and metallurgist

== Sport ==
- Matthew Austin, cricketer
- Richard Beesly, Olympic gold medal, 1928 Coxless fours rowing
- Rollo Brandt, bobsledder, competed for Great Britain at 1956 Winter Olympics
- Farn Carpmael, rower
- Carston Catcheside, former England rugby player
- Alexander Crawford, cricketer
- Ben Curry, England rugby player
- Tom Curry, England rugby player
- Bill Elsey, racehorse trainer
- Patrick Foster, cricketer
- Christopher Gimson, cricketer and civil servant
- Eric Gore-Browne, cricketer
- Tom Harrison, fmr. cricketer and current CEO of the England and Wales Cricket Board (ECB)
- Iain Henderson, cricketer
- Reggie Ingle, cricketer
- Will Jefferson, professional cricketer
- David Jennens, Olympic rower
- Sir Harry Morton Llewellyn, 3rd Baronet, showjumper
- Robert Martin, cricketer
- Michael Maw, cricketer
- John Michael Mills, cricketer
- Peter Morley, president Crystal Palace Football Club
- Sam Olver, rugby player
- Richard Pearsall, cricketer
- Mark Phythian, cricketer
- Alfred Graham Skinner, cricketer
- Greg Smith, cricketer
- John Willoughby Dixie Smith, cricketer
- Tom Stallard, Olympic rower
- Arthur Sutthery, cricketer
- Tim Swinson, rugby player
- Cameron Wake, cricketer
- Dave Walder, professional rugby player
- Legh Winser, cricketer and golfer
- Arthur Woodhouse, cricketer
- James Wykes, cricketer and schoolmaster
- Norman Wykes, cricketer
