= Wykes =

- Gender: surname

Origin
- Origin: English

Other names
- Variant forms: Wecks, Week, Weeks, Weekes Whicks, Whikes, Whykes, Wick, Wickes, Wicks, Wix, Wycha, and Wyke
- See also: Wyke (surname)
- Found in: United Kingdom, Australia, United States, Canada, New Zealand, India

Wykes is a very old surname from an English origin. The current distribution of Wykes' tends to be in the UK and the former British Colonies. There are Wykes' living in the United Kingdom, Australia, United States, Canada, New Zealand and even India.

== Variants ==
Over centuries the surname has changed and now has variants. Some of the present-day variants include Wecks, Week, Weeks, Whicks, Whikes, Whykes, Wick, Wickes, Wicks, Wix, Wycha, and Wyke. It is likely that one source of the name originates in Saxon times. A wyke was the Saxon term for a dairying hamlet, or small village.

== History ==
Wykes is not a common surname, but it is definitely an old one. That it is an English name seems certain, although some of the alternate spellings have more recent Scandinavian or continental Germanic origins. Wykes was one of the original 5 or 6 pre-Norman surnames in England.

The earliest written record of the name is in the Anglo Saxon Chronicle of AD 1002 which mentions one Sygmund Wycha, "freeholder and huntsman".

Elizabeth Wykes was the daughter of Henry Wykes of Putney, Surrey, a shearman who later became a gentleman usher to Henry VII.

== Notable Wykes ==
- Adrian Wykes (born 1958), English cricketer
- Alissa Wykes (born 1967/8), American football player
- David Wykes (1867–1895), English footballer
- Dylan Wykes (born 1983), Canadian long-distance runner
- Geoffrey Wykes (1890–1926), English cricketer
- James Wykes (1913–1992), English cricketer and schoolmaster
- Nicholas Wykes (c. 1488–1558), English landowner and MP
- Norman Wykes (1906–1991), English cricketer
- Paul Wykes (born 1971), English snooker player
- Robert Wykes (1926–2021), American composer and flautist
- Sam Wykes (born 1988), Australian rugby union footballer
- Sarah Wykes (born 1965), British human rights activist
- Ted Wykes (1921–2008), Australian cricket umpire
- Thomas Wykes (chronicler) (1222–1291/93), English chronicler
- Thomas Wykes (MP for Cambridgeshire) (died c.1430), English MP for Cambridgeshire
- Thomas Wykes (MP for Leominster) (fl. 1554), English MP for Leominster
- Dame Til Wykes (born 1953), English academic, author and editor
- Walter Wykes (born 1969), American playwright
