= Anthony Murley =

English cricketer

Personal information
- Full name: Anthony Jonathan Murley
- Born: 7 August 1957 (age 69); Radlett, Hertfordshire, England
- Batting: Right-handed
- Bowling: Right-arm medium

Domestic team information
- Years: Team
- 1981: Cambridge University

Career statistics
Competition	First-class
Matches	6
Runs scored	152
Batting average	13.81
100s/50s	–/–
Top score	48
Balls bowled	12
Wickets	0
Bowling average	–
5 wickets in innings	–
10 wickets in match	–
Best bowling	–
Catches/stumpings	2/–
- Source: Cricinfo, 26 January 2022

Anthony Jonathan Murley (born 7 August 1957) is an English former first-class cricketer.

Murley was born at Radlett in August 1957. He was educated at Oundle School, before going up to St Catharine's College, Cambridge. While studying at Cambridge, he played first-class cricket for Cambridge University Cricket Club in 1981, making six appearances. Playing as an opening batsman alongside Peter Mills in five of these matches, he scored 152 runs at an average of 13.81 and a highest score of 48.
