= John Chris Jones =

Welsh design researcher (1927–2022)

- Born: John Christopher Jones; 7 October 1927; Hafren, Caergog, Aberystwyth
- Died: 13 August 2022 (aged 94); North London Hospice, London
- Occupations: Design theorist, designer, researcher, writer

Academic work
- Discipline: Design Methods
- Institutions: Open University
- Notable works: Design Methods: seeds of human futures
- Website: http://www.publicwriting.net/

John Christopher Jones (7 October 1927 – 13 August 2022), known professionally as John Chris Jones, was a Welsh design researcher and theorist. He became the first Professor of Design at the Open University in 1970. His book Design Methods: Seeds of Human Futures is considered a major text in design methods.

== Career ==
Jones was born in Aberystwyth, Wales, to Jennie Jones (formerly Humphreys) (1896–1979) and Christopher John Jones (1880–1969). Because his father, a retired teacher, was obliged to teach at various institutions around the country in order to cover for those serving in the war, the young John Christopher followed in his train, attending Ardwyn Grammar School in Aberystwyth, Laxton Grammar School in Oundle, and, finally, St Bees School in Cumbria. After spending a year at the University College of Wales, Aberystwyth, he completed his national service before going up to study mechanical sciences (engineering) at Pembroke College, Cambridge. Following university, he went on to work for AEI in Manchester, England.

From his early collaboration with engineers, Jones advocated ergonomics and the consideration of user centred issues that were not part of engineering skills and attitudes at the time. When the results of his ergonomic studies of user behaviour were not utilized by the firm's designers, Jones set about studying and improving the design process so as to incorporate these aspects. He was also frustrated with the superficiality of industrial design at the time.

At the end of the 1950s he published an article "A Systematic Design Method" articulating ways to integrate ergonomic data into the engineering design process. His emerging ideas about Design Methods was to integrate both rationality and intuition — a common thread in the formalization of Design Methods and how it was interpreted by other groups. In 1962 he was one of the instigators of the influential conference on design methods, which led to the formation of the Design Research Society, of which Jones was Chair 1971-73. In 2004 he was presented with the Society's Lifetime Achievement Award.

Jones wasn't actually addressing design as presently conceived. He set out an entirely original philosophy of design—one that questioned the aims, goals and purposes of designing. He stated that one of the reasons why he focused on Design Methods was

". . . it's not another way of doing design, you see, it's a way of doing what designers don't do at all."

Jones also realized that designers needed to move out of focusing on expression and modes of production and begin to address the definition of a problem to be solved. He commented that

"the future job of a designer is to give substance to new ideas while taking away the physical and organizational foundations of old ones. In this situation, it is nonsense to think of designing as the satisfaction of existing requirements. New needs grow and old needs decay . . ."

From 1970-74 Jones was the first Professor of Design at The Open University, and then became an independent designer, researcher and writer.

Jones died on 13 August 2022 in the North London Hospice.

== Books ==
- Jones, John Christopher, Design Methods: seeds of human futures, John Wiley & Sons Ltd., Chichester, 1970; 2nd edition, John Wiley & Sons Ltd., 1992
- Jones, John Christopher, Essays in Design, John Wiley & Sons Ltd., Chichester, 1984
- Jones, John Christopher, Designing Designing, Architecture Design and Technology Press, London, 1991
- Jones, John Christopher, The Internet and Everyone, Ellipsis, London, 2000
