= Barry Pryer =

English cricketer

Personal information
- Full name: Barry James Keith Pryer
- Born: 1 February 1925; Plumstead, London, England
- Died: 15 October 2007 (aged 82); Perth, Western Australia
- Batting: Right-handed
- Bowling: Right-arm leg-spin
- Role: Bowler

Domestic team information
- Years: Team
- 1947–1949: Kent
- 1948–1949: Cambridge University

Career statistics
Competition	First-class
Matches	27
Runs scored	252
Batting average	9.33
100s/50s	0/1
Top score	75*
Balls bowled	3745
Wickets	48
Bowling average	39.33
5 wickets in innings	0
10 wickets in match	0
Best bowling	4/25
Catches/stumpings	9/–
- Source: Cricinfo, 9 February 2019

Barry James Keith Pryer (1 February 1925 – 15 October 2007) was an English cricketer who played first-class cricket between 1946 and 1950, mostly for Kent County Cricket Club and Cambridge University. He was born in Plumstead and died in Perth, Western Australia.

Pryer attended the City of London School and served in the Fleet Air Arm before going up to St Catharine's College, Cambridge. A leg-spin bowler and lower-order batsman, he took his best bowling figures of 4 for 25 on his first-class debut for Combined Services against Surrey in 1946. In Cambridge's match against Worcestershire in 1949 he had match figures of 57–19–133–7. His highest score was 75 not out for Cambridge against Middlesex in 1948, when he and Richard Pearsall added an unbeaten 149 in 90 minutes for the ninth wicket.

Pryer and his wife Faye spent some years in the late 1960s and early 1970s in Iraq, where he worked as a lawyer for the Iraq Petroleum Group of Companies in Baghdad. He moved to Australia after his retirement.
