= Here am I, send me =

Bronze statue by Kathleen Scott

Here am I, send me is a bronze statue by Kathleen Scott. Casts were erected as memorials after the First World War at two schools associated with the Scott family, both attended by Kathleen's son Peter Scott: West Downs School in Winchester, Hampshire, and Oundle School in Oundle, Northamptonshire. The West Downs School memorial was relocated to the Slimbridge Wetlands Centre in the 1980s, where it was designated as a Grade II listed building in 2019.

The statue depicts a naked boy in a contrapposto posture, with his right arm raised as if volunteering. The statue was modelled on the son of Giovanni Fiorini, an Italian bronze founder who worked in London from 1910 to 1929. The title is a quotation from the Book of Isaiah, chapter 6, verse 8, in which the prophet responds to an angel's question “Whom shall I send? And who will go for us?” with the answer "Here am I! Send me!"

West Downs School was an independent preparatory school in Winchester, which Peter Scott attended. Its casting of the statue was mounted on tall square Portland stone plinth bearing the inscription "HERE AM I / SEND ME". The front of the plinth also bears the dates "1914-1918" and the names of 38 former pupils who died in the First World War. A further inscription "1939-1945" and 81 more names were added after the Second World War. After the school closed in the 1980s, the memorial was moved to the Slimbridge Wetlands Centre in Gloucestershire, continuing the association with Peter Scott. The relocated war memorial at Slimbridge was designated as a Grade II listed building in 2019.

A second cast was erected near the chapel at Oundle School, a public school in Northamptonshire. The statue stands outside the Yarrow Gallery on Glapthorn Road in Oundle, mounted on a narrow stone plinth also inscribed "HERE AM I / SEND ME". The Yarrow Gallery was funded by the industrialist Sir Alfred Yarrow, 1st Baronet in memory of his younger son Eric who was killed in action in the Second Battle of Ypres in May 1915. When Peter Scott was educated at Oundle some years later, he was unable to displace the unfounded presumption that he had modelled for the sculpture. The Oundle statue remains in position outside the Yarrow Gallery.
