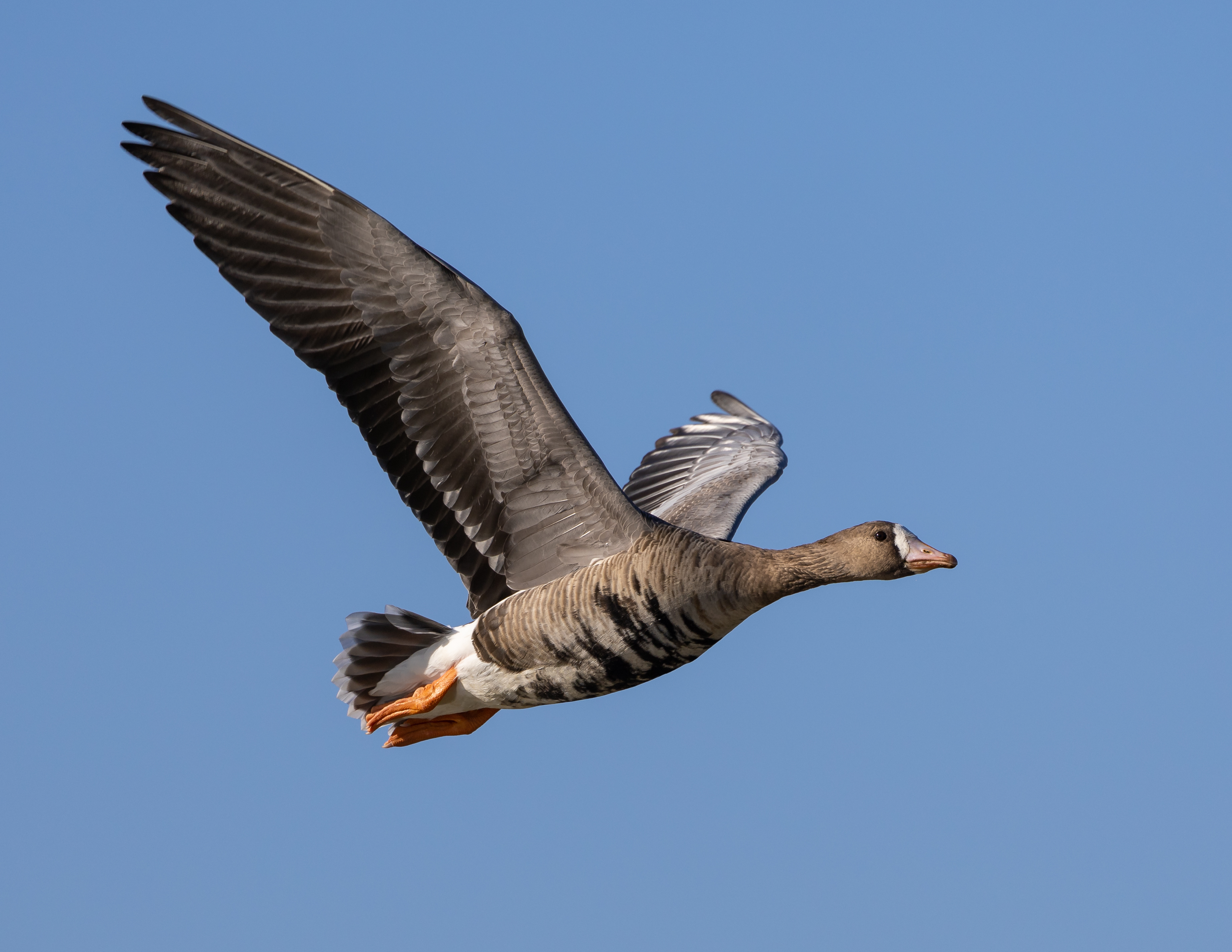
- A greater white-fronted goose during migration in the Central Valley of California

Conservation status
- Least Concern (IUCN 3.1)

Scientific classification
- Kingdom: Animalia
- Phylum: Chordata
- Class: Aves
- Order: Anseriformes
- Family: Anatidae
- Genus: Anser
- Species: A. albifrons

Binomial name
- Anser albifrons (Scopoli, 1769)

Subspecies
- A. a. albifrons European white-fronted goose (Scopoli, 1769); A. a. frontalis Pacific white-fronted goose Baird, 1858; A. a. gambeli Gambel's white-fronted goose Hartlaub, 1852; A. a. elgasi Tule goose Delacour & Ripley, 1975 (disputed); A. a. flavirostris Greenland white-fronted goose Dalgety & Scott, 1948
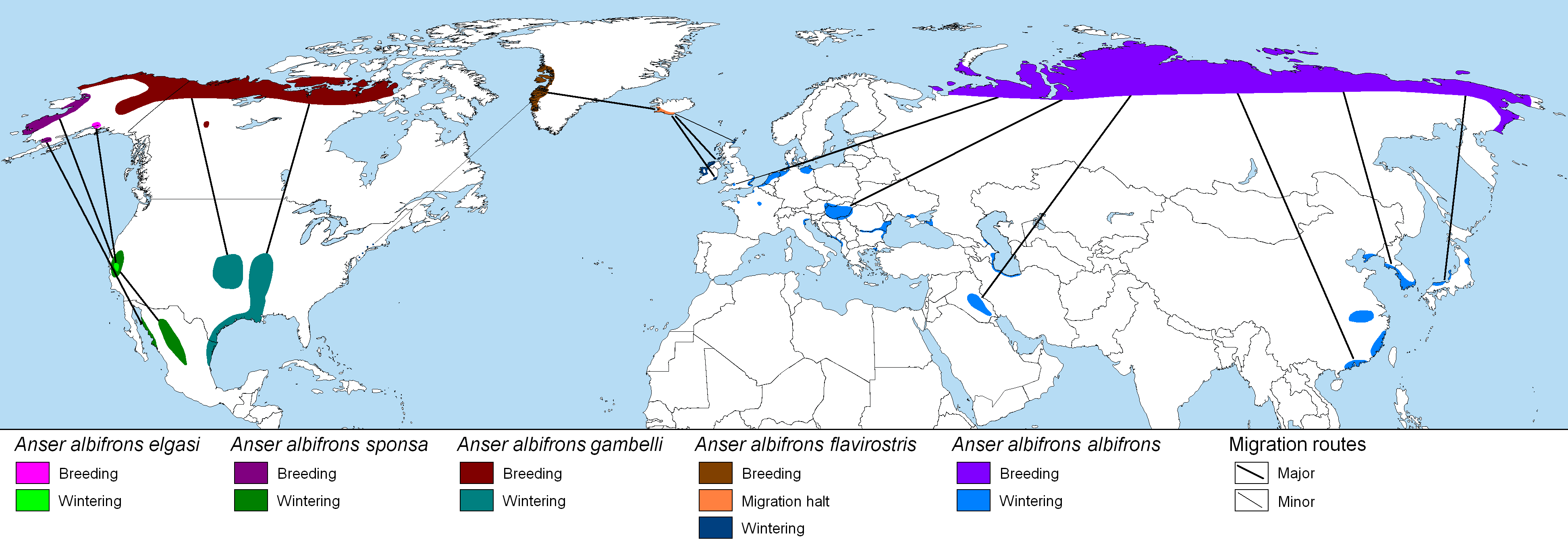
- Distribution map of subspecies of greater white-fronted goose

Synonyms
- Branta albifrons Scopoli, 1769

= Greater white-fronted goose =

Species of bird

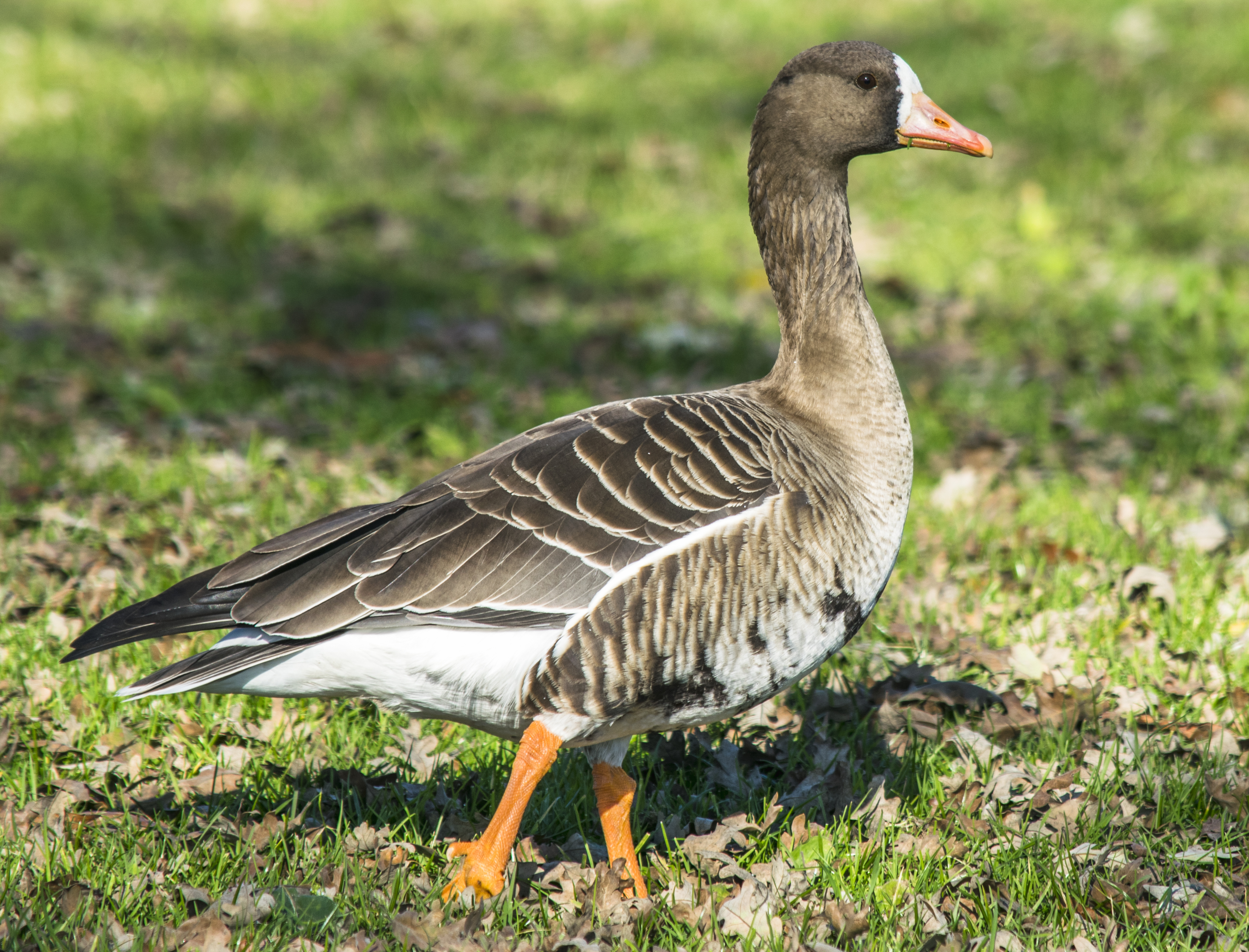
Greater white-fronted goose in California

Greater white-fronted geese, Texel, Netherlands (2013)

The greater white-fronted goose (Anser albifrons) is a species of goose, closely related to the smaller lesser white-fronted goose (A. erythropus). The greater white-fronted goose is migratory, breeding in northern Canada, Alaska, Greenland, and Russia, and winters farther south in North America, Europe, and Asia. It is named for the patch of white feathers bordering the base of its bill; its specific name albifrons comes from the Latin albus "white" and frons "forehead". In the United Kingdom and Ireland, it has been known as the white-fronted goose; in North America, it is known as the greater white-fronted goose (or "greater whitefront"), and this name is also increasingly adopted internationally. Even more distinctive are the salt-and-pepper markings on the breast of adult birds, which is why the goose is colloquially called the "specklebelly" in North America.

== Description ==
Anser albifrons – Greater White-fronted Goose – XC96532

Greater white-fronted geese are 64–81 cm (25–32 in) in length, have a 130–165 cm (51–65 in) wingspan, and weigh 1.93–3.31 kg (4 lb 4 oz – 7 lb 5 oz). They have bright orange legs and mouse-coloured upper wing coverts. They are smaller than greylag geese. The greater white-fronted goose is larger than and lacks the yellow eye ring of the lesser white-fronted goose, and its white facial blaze does not extend upwards so far as in the lesser.

The male is typically larger in size, but both sexes are similar in appearance—greyish brown birds with light grey breasts dappled with dark brown to black blotches and bars. Both males and females also have a pinkish bill.

Greater white-fronted geese make a variation of sounds, but notably the most recognizable is their high-pitched cackle that can be imitated by the sounds "he-he". A distinct breaking of the note occurs from the first cackle to the second.

=== Differences between European and Greenland birds ===
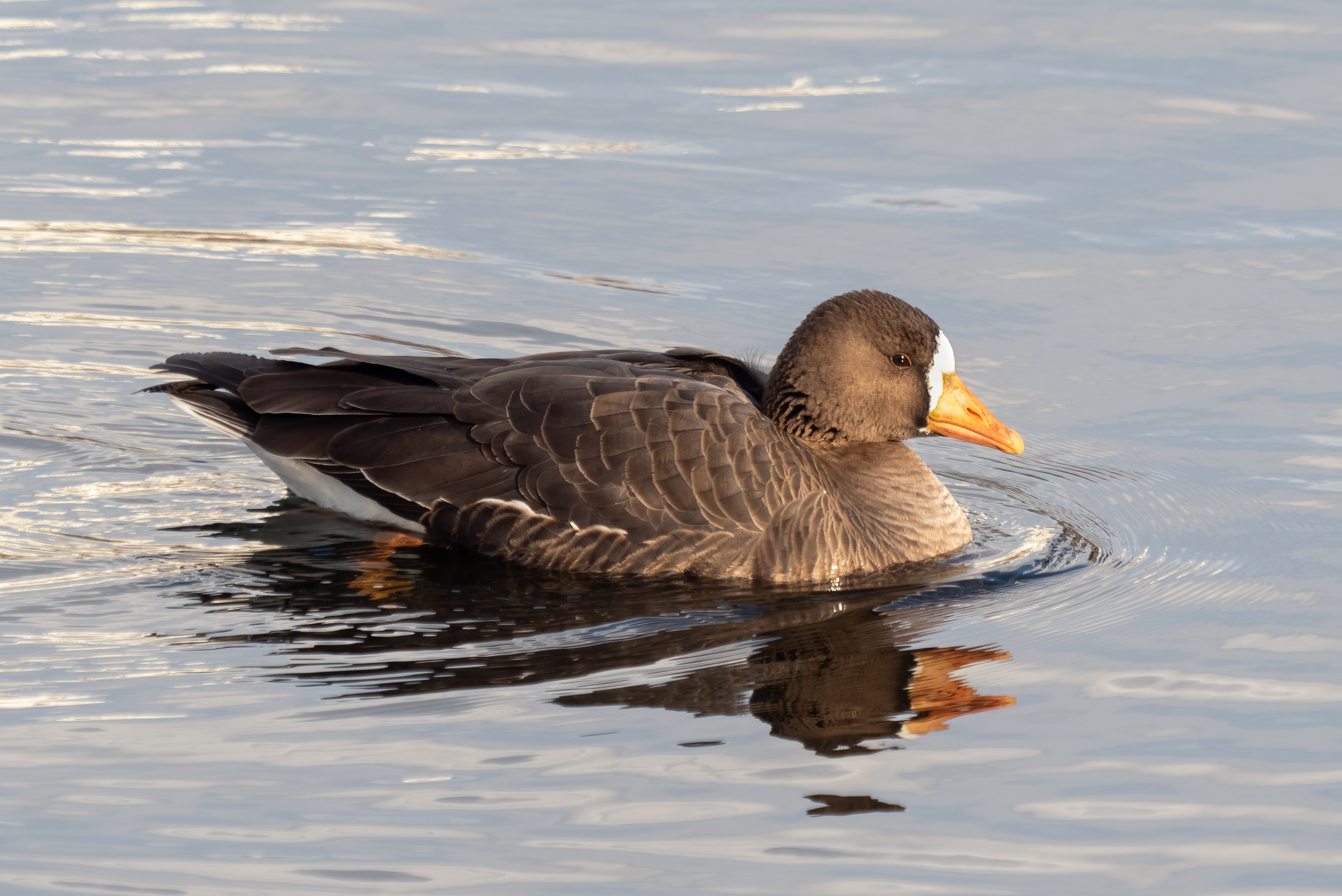
A. a. flavirostris, the Greenland subspecies

The appearance of European or Russian white-fronted geese, of the subspecies A. a. albifrons and Greenland white-fronted geese, of the subspecies A. a. flavirostris (which winters in the British Isles and occasionally reaches the northwest European mainland), differ in a number of ways. The former, in all plumages, looks darker and more "oily-looking" than the latter, both at rest and in flight.

The differences that apply to first-winter plumage are:

- The mantle and scapulars of A. a. flavirostris have narrow, indistinct pale fringes creating a uniform appearance to the birds' upperparts, whereas A. a. albifrons has noticeable whitish fringes creating obviously barred upperparts.
- The tertials of A. a. flavirostris have indistinct pale fringes, whereas these pale fringes are more noticeable on A. a. albifrons
- The lesser and median upperwing coverts of A. a. flavirostris have narrow, indistinct pale fringes, creating a rather uniform appearance to the wing, whereas on A. a. albifrons, these fringes are prominent and broad, creating wing bars.
- The greater coverts of A. a. flavirostris are dark grey, with a narrow white tip, forming a narrow wing bar; on A. a. albifrons, they are blue-grey, with prominent white tips, forming a bold wing bar.
- The flank line is narrow and white on A. a. flavirostris, but broad and bright white on A. a. albifrons
- The tail of A. a. flavirostris is dark brown, with a very narrow white tip and sides; that of A. a. albifrons is dark grey, and the white tip and sides are at least double the width of the corresponding areas on A. a. flavirostris.
- The bill of A. a. flavirostris is orange-yellow with a dark nail, compared with the bright-pink bill of A. a. albifrons, which has only a hint of dark on the nail; in addition, the bill of the former is longer and appears slimmer than that of the latter.

The belly barring on adult birds is on average more extensive on A. a. flavirostris than on A. a. albifrons, but the individual variation in both forms renders this of limited use as an identification feature.

The bill of adult Greenland white-fronts are also orange-yellow at the base, but can be more pinkish-yellow on the outer half, thus close in colour to European white-fronts; the colour difference is more easily determined in dull, flat light rather than bright sunshine.

The Greenland white-fronts are of conservation concern. While most populations of the species have been increasing, the Greenland population continuously declined in the first two decades of the 2000s (after having continuously increased in the two preceding decades). The reason for this decline is not entirely clear, but likely is related to more extreme weather conditions.

== Taxonomy ==
The greater white-fronted goose is divided into five subspecies. The nominate subspecies, the European white-fronted goose (A. a. albifrons) breeds in the far north of Russia and winters further south and west in Europe and Asia.

Three other restricted-range subspecies occur in northern North America: Gambel's white-fronted goose (A. a. gambeli) in interior northwestern Canada and wintering on the coast of the Gulf of Mexico, slightly larger than the nominate form, the Pacific white-fronted goose (A. a. frontalis), and the tule goose (A. a. elgasi) in southwest Alaska, the largest and longest-billed of all, both wintering in California. All these subspecies are similar in plumage, differing only in size.

The very distinct Greenland white-fronted goose (A. a. flavirostris) breeding in western Greenland, is much darker overall, with only a very narrow white tip to the tail (broader on the other subspecies), more black barring on its belly and usually has an orange (not pink) bill. It winters in Ireland and western Scotland.

Birds breeding in the far east of Siberia east to Arctic Canada, wintering in the United States and Japan, have been described as A. a. frontalis on the basis of their slightly larger size and a marginally longer bill. Another putative East Asian subspecies (A. a. albicans) has also been described. A 2012 study has found that A. a. frontalis and A. a. albicans do not merit subspecies status, the former being synonymised with A. a. gambeli and the latter with the nominate subspecies; this study found that these forms had been named on the wintering grounds from specimens whose breeding grounds were unknown.

Ecological studies conducted in 2002 suggest the Greenland birds should probably be considered a separate species from A. albifrons. Of particular interest is its unusually long period of parental care and association, which may last several years and can include grandparenting, possibly unique among the Anseriformes.

Hybridization with snow geese and Canada geese is occasionally observed..

== Distribution ==
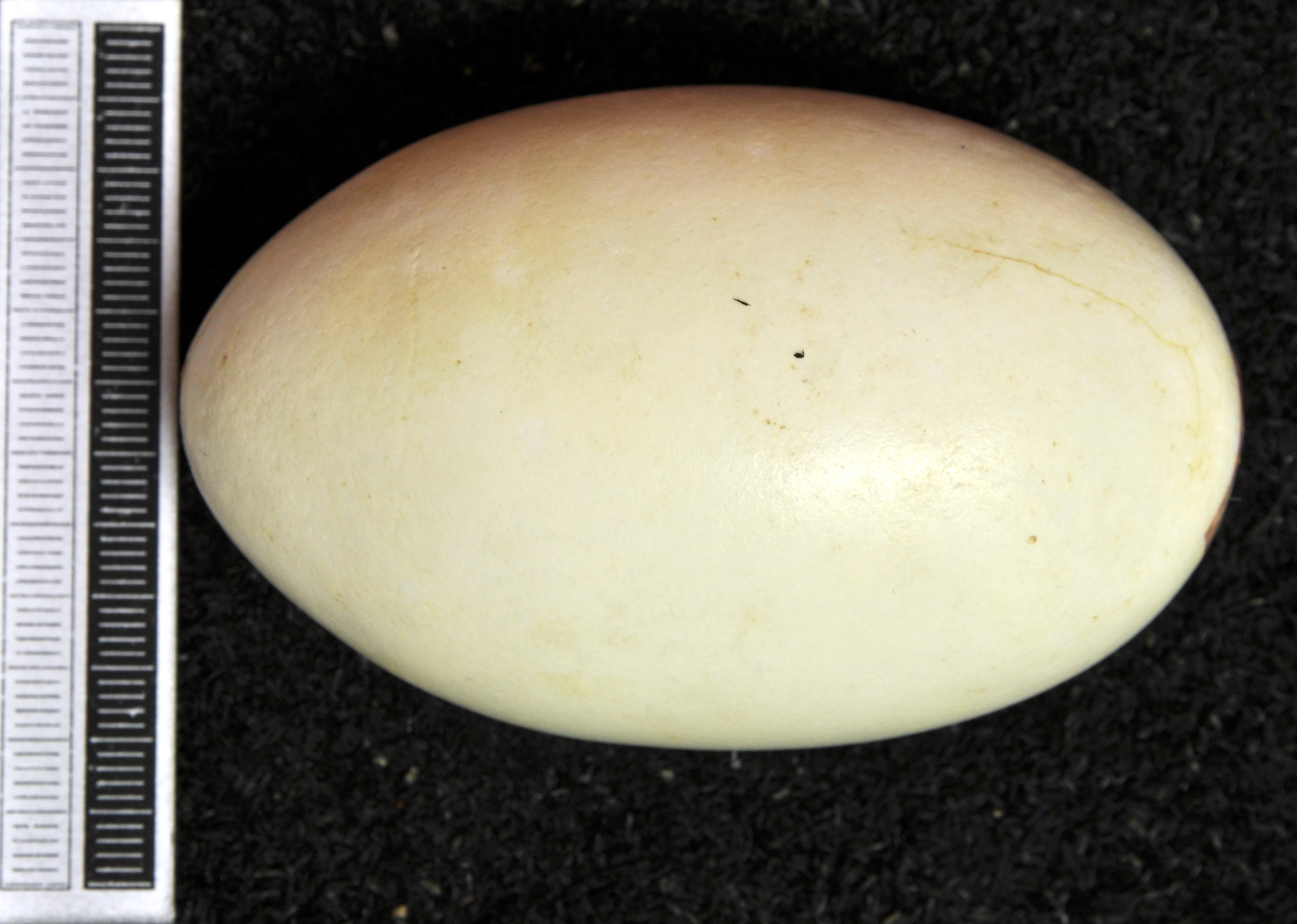
Egg, Collection Museum Wiesbaden

The North American midcontinent birds of the subspecies A. a. gambeli – which in 2010 had a fall population around 710,000 birds – breeds from the Alaska North Slope across the western and central Canadian Arctic. The Pacific white-fronted goose of the American Pacific coast, which in 2010 numbered approximately 650,000 birds, and the tule geese, which are estimated to number 10,000 birds, nest in western Alaska. The midcontinent geese gather in early fall on the prairies of western Saskatchewan and eastern Alberta, spending several weeks feeding before heading to wintering areas near the Gulf of Mexico, into northern Mexico. The Pacific birds migrate south along the Pacific coast, staging primarily in the Klamath Basin of southern Oregon and northern California and wintering, eventually, in California's Central Valley. The tule goose is somewhat rare and has been since the latter half of the 19th century; presumably it was affected by destruction of its wintering habitat due to human settlement.

In the British Isles, two subspecies overwinter: Greenland birds in Scotland and Ireland, and Russian birds in England and Wales. They gather on farmland at favoured traditional sites, with a famous flock gathering at WWT Slimbridge, Gloucestershire, England. Greenland birds also overwinter in Ireland and from late September and through the winter, Ireland is home to almost 50% of the Greenland population of white-fronted geese.

A. a. albifrons and A. a. flavirostis are among the taxa to which the Agreement on the Conservation of African-Eurasian Migratory Waterbirds (AEWA) applies.

== Behaviour and ecology ==
=== Breeding ===
Weather conditions are a key factor in the annual breeding success of white-fronted geese. In the Arctic, the window of opportunity for nesting, incubating eggs, and raising a brood to flight state is open briefly, for about three months. Arriving in late May or early June, white-fronted geese begin departing for fall staging areas in early September. This means that a delayed snowmelt or late spring storm can significantly reduce the birds' reproductive success.

The white to tan colored eggs measure 8–8.3 cm (3.1–3.3 in) long and 5.3–5.4 cm (2.1 in) long. Clutch size can range from one to eight eggs, which are incubated for 22–27 days. Young will leave the nest within 24 hours of hatching.

=== Origin of migration ===
Midcontinental white-fronted geese in North America have many breeding areas and each group in each breeding area differs in its migration time and wintering location. The six breeding areas include interior Alaska and Alaska's North Slope, western Northwest Territories, western Nunavut, central Nunavut, and eastern Nunavut. These spatial differences lead to different departure times for white-fronted geese leaving their breeding areas. Birds from interior Alaska start migrating earlier during autumn and fly farther south to winter. Due to their migration, white-fronted geese are commonly sought after by waterfowl hunters, all across the country.

A technique using stable isotope analysis from a white-fronted goose has shown promise in providing a way to determine the migratory route birds take from their wintering to breeding grounds.

== Recognition ==
An art installation and sundial at the Royal Society for the Protection of Birds (RSPB)'s Loch Lomond nature reserve in Scotland celebrates the birds' winter migratory visits to the area. Installed in 2023, it represents the white-fronted and other geese who winter there. The RSPB estimates that 1.3% of the world's population of greenland white-fronted geese can be found there each October.

== Gallery ==
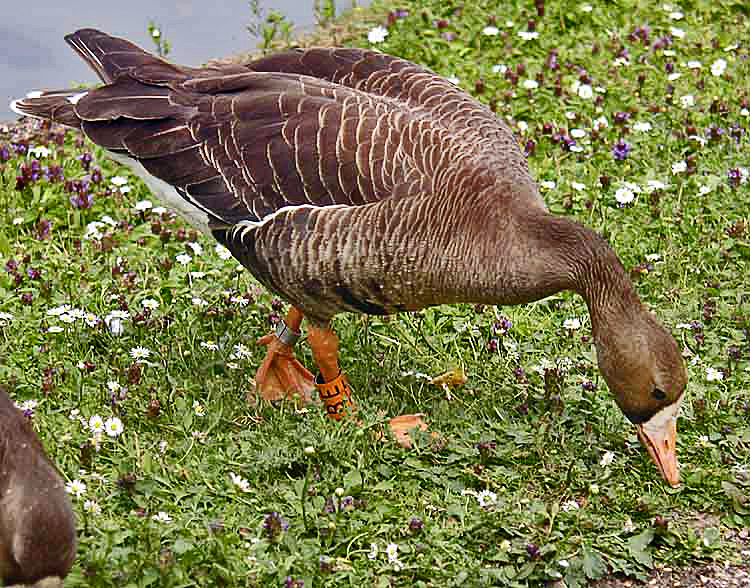
European white-fronted goose (A. a. albifrons) at the Slimbridge Wildfowl and Wetlands Centre

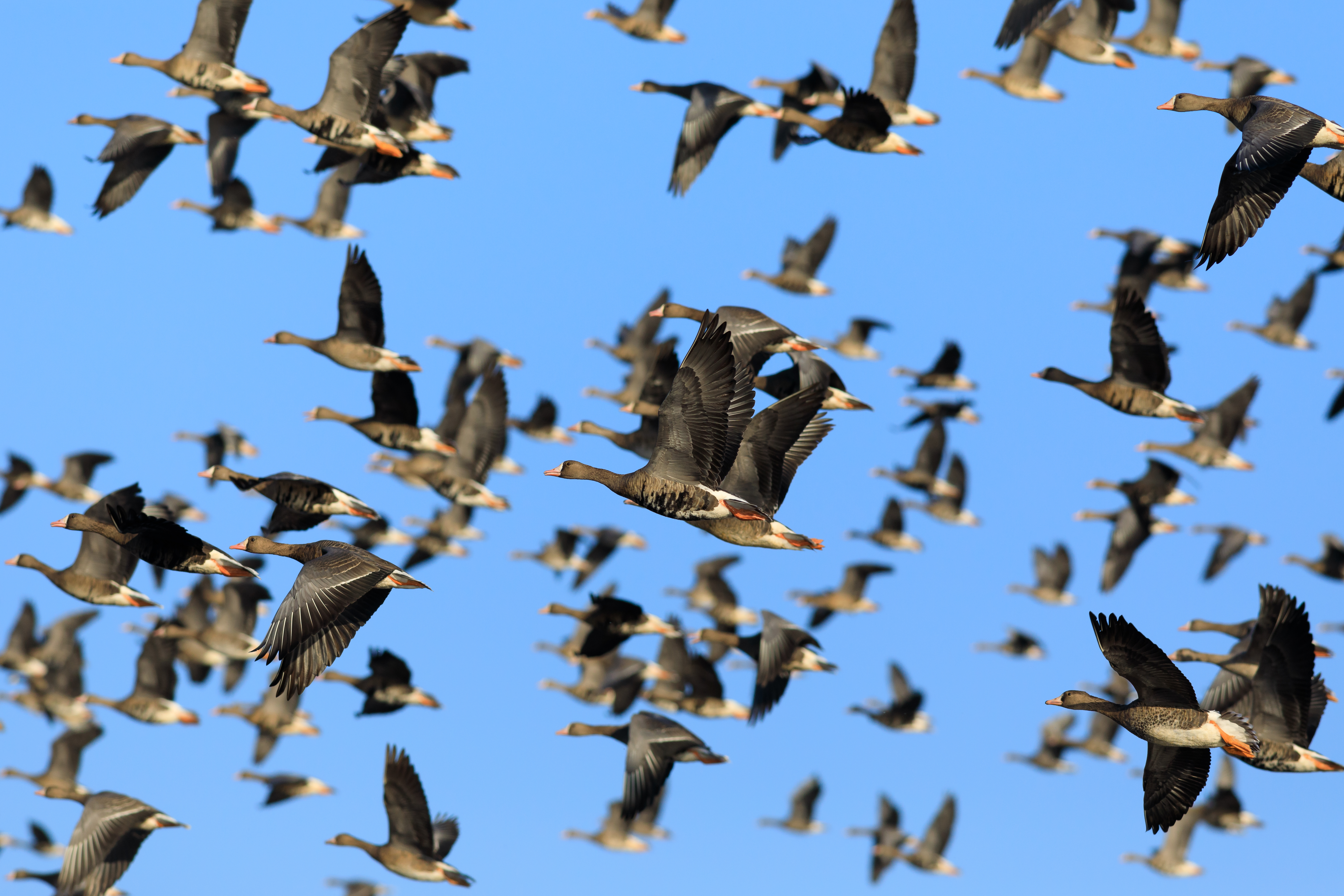
In flight

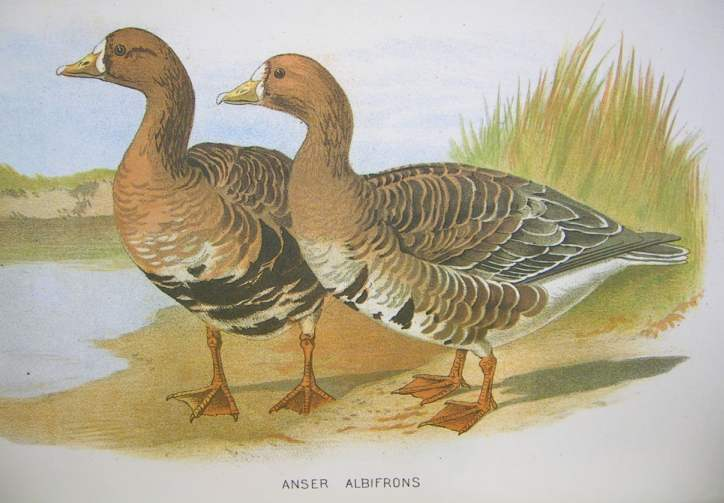
Illustration from Hume and Marshall's Gamebirds of India, Burmah, and Ceylon

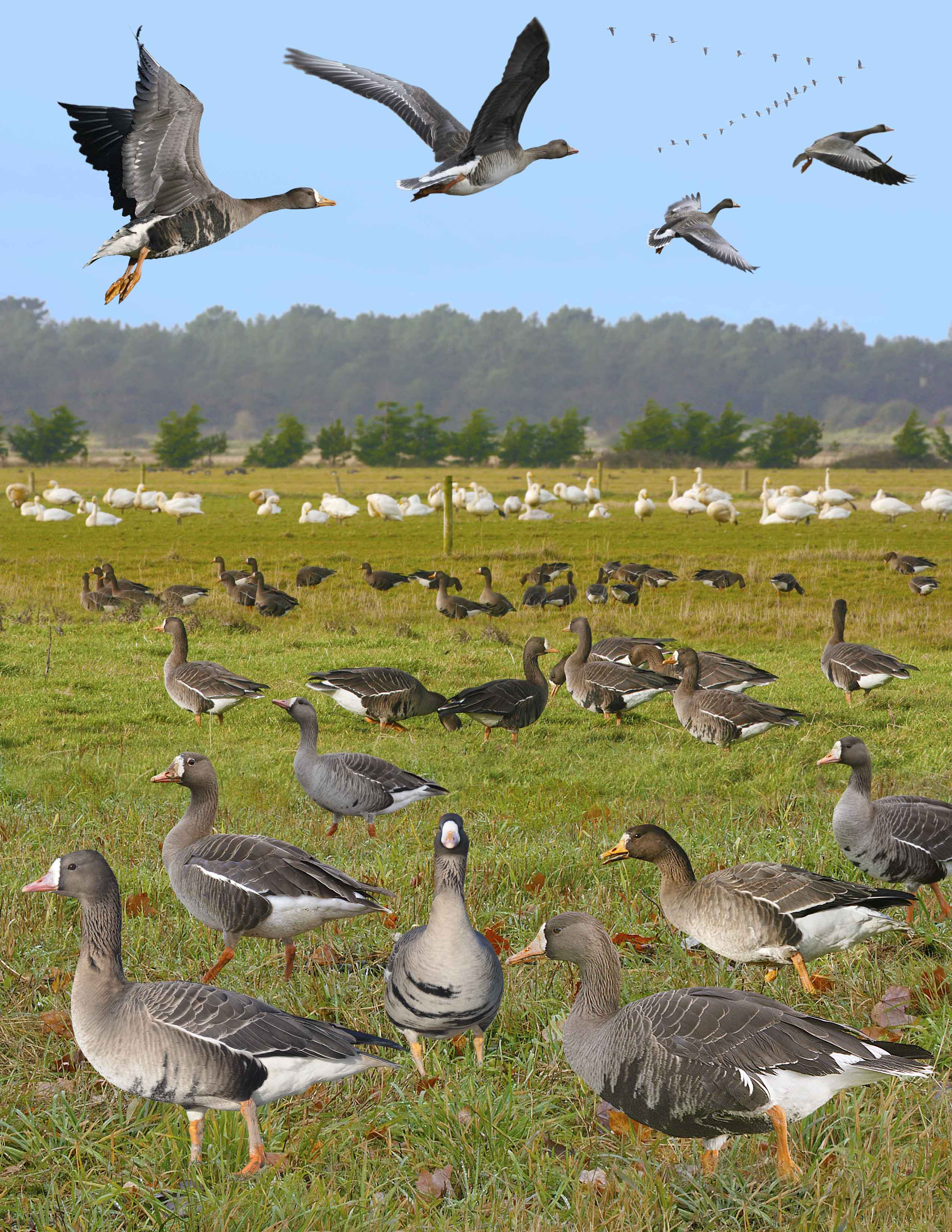
ID composite
