= Glapthorn =

Village in Northamptonshire, England

Coordinates: 52.5037°N 0.4946°W

- Location within Northamptonshire
- Population: 271 (2011)
- OS grid reference: TL0290
- Unitary authority: North Northamptonshire
- Ceremonial county: Northamptonshire
- Region: East Midlands
- Country: England
- Sovereign state: United Kingdom
- Post town: Peterborough
- Postcode district: PE8
- Dialling code: 01832
- Police: Northamptonshire
- Fire: Northamptonshire
- Ambulance: East Midlands
- UK Parliament: Corby and East Northamptonshire
- Website: www.glapthorn.org.uk

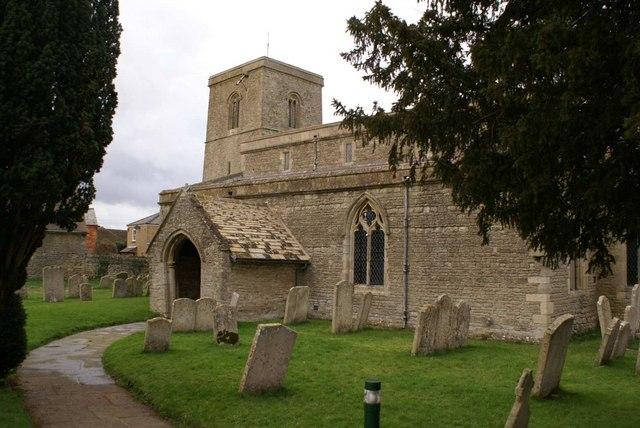

Glapthorn is a village and civil parish in North Northamptonshire, England. At the time of the 2001 census, the parish's population was 264 people, increasing to 271 at the 2011 Census.

The villages name origin is uncertain. 'Glappa's thorn-tree' or 'glaep-thorn' an otherwise obscure plant name.

Glapthorn is approximately 1 1/2 miles NNW of Oundle, the closest town. North of the village is a small wood, Short Wood, with a Saxon earthwork. After suffering from widespread "Dutch Elm Disease" tree infection in the 1970s, the woodland is recovering its attraction and is allure known for its May-time display of bluebell-carpeted open coppice. Many other species inhabit the woodland, resulting in its classification as an SSSI. It is publicly accessible as a nature reserve.

Glapthorn's church of St Leonard's mostly dates back to the 13th century with the porch and south doorway added in the 14th century. The altar rail and panels in the pulpit were installed during the reign of James I. Other noteworthy items are a Victorian bier, an original pew located at the back of the church, three bells (one of which dates to the 14th century by John Sleyt), and an organ. The church retains traces of medieval paintings of what is believed to be St. Christopher.

== Notable people ==
- Iain Henderson (born 1967), cricketer
