= Peter Mills (cricketer) =

English cricketer (born 1958)

John Peter Crispin Mills, known as Peter Mills, is an English former cricketer who played from 1979 to 1982 for Cambridge University and Northamptonshire. He appeared in 41 first-class matches as a right-handed batsman. Mills was born in Kettering on 6 December 1958 and was educated at Oundle School and Corpus Christi College, Cambridge|. He is the son of Michael Mills, who played for Cambridge University and Warwickshire after the Second World War.

Peter Mills scored 1,585 runs with a highest score of 111. He bowled just one over of right-arm medium pace in first-class cricket. He played Minor Counties cricket for Cambridgeshire between 1980 and 1984.
