= Wyke =

Wyke may refer to:

== Places in England ==
- Wyke, North Dorset, an area of Gillingham
- Wyke Regis, Dorset
- Wyke, Shropshire
- Wyke Champflower, Somerset
- Wyke, Surrey
- Wyke, Bradford, an area of Bradford, West Yorkshire
- Wyke, an area of Kingston upon Hull, East Riding of Yorkshire
  - Wyke College, a school
- Wike, West Yorkshire, a hamlet in Leeds district, West Yorkshire

== People ==
- Charlie Wyke (born 1992), English footballer
- Charles Lennox Wyke (1815-1897), British diplomat
- John atte Wyke (fl.1373-1386), English MP
- Maria Wyke (born 1957), English professor of Latin
- Roger Wyke (died c.1467), English member of Parliament

== Broadcast call signs ==
- WYKE-CD, a low-power television station (channel 24, virtual 47) licensed to serve Inglis/Yankeetown, Florida, United States
- WXZC, a radio station (104.3 FM) licensed to serve Inglis, Florida, which held the call sign WYKE from 2011 to 2018

== See also ==
- Lower Wyke, Hampshire, England
- Middle Wyke, Hampshire, England
- North Wyke, Devon, England
- Wyke Farms
- Wyke House, Middlesex, England
- Wykes, a surname
