= Michael Mills (English cricketer) =

English cricketer (1921–2014)

Personal information
- Full name: John Michael Mills
- Born: 27 July 1921; Birmingham, Warwickshire, England
- Died: 8 November 2014 (aged 93); Oundle, Northamptonshire, England
- Batting: Right-handed
- Bowling: Right-arm leg-spin

Domestic team information
- Years: Team
- 1946 to 1948: Cambridge University
- 1946: Warwickshire

Career statistics
| Competition | First-class |
|---|---|
| Matches | 38 |
| Runs scored | 743 |
| Batting average | 14.86 |
| 100s/50s | 0/0 |
| Top score | 44 |
| Balls bowled | 6366 |
| Wickets | 95 |
| Bowling average | 28.86 |
| 5 wickets in innings | 5 |
| 10 wickets in match | – |
| Best bowling | 7/69 |
| Catches/stumpings | 13/– |
- Source: Cricinfo, 19 November 2018

John Michael Mills (27 July 1921 – 8 November 2014) was an English cricketer who played first-class cricket for Cambridge University and Warwickshire between 1946 and 1948.

Michael Mills was a right-handed lower-order batsman and a right-arm leg-break and googly bowler. Educated at Oundle School and Corpus Christi College, Cambridge, Mills went to Cambridge University after war service. He hit an unbeaten 65 and took five wickets in the freshmen's trial match and thereafter provided the only spin bowling in the 1946 university cricket side. In his second first-class match, he took seven Yorkshire first innings wickets for 69 runs, and these remained the best bowling figures of his career. Against Somerset at Bath he took the first six wickets to fall, and only seven fell in all; they included Harold Gimblett, who hit 114 in 95 minutes and accounted for some of the 100 runs that Mills' wickets cost. He was not successful in the 1946 University Match in which he won the first of his three consecutive Blues for cricket. At the end of the university cricket season, Mills played in four matches for Warwickshire; with England leg-spin bowler Eric Hollies in the side, his bowling opportunities were limited and in the game against Nottinghamshire he did not bowl at all in the first innings when Hollies took all 10 Nottinghamshire wickets for 49 runs.

Mills continued to play for Cambridge University in the 1947 and 1948 seasons, winning his Blue in both years, but did not play any further games for Warwickshire. He captained Oxford in 1948. His bowling became more expensive and his batting, though often useful, did not develop: he had a career average, over 50 completed first-class innings, of almost 15 runs per innings, but his highest score was only 44. He did not play any further first-class cricket after leaving Cambridge University. He also won Blues for squash and fives.

He returned to Oundle School as a housemaster, and ran the cricket there for 12 years. His son, Peter Mills, played for Cambridge University and for Northamptonshire between 1979 and 1982.
