= Richard Pearsall (cricketer) =

English cricketer

Personal information
- Full name: Richard Devenish Pearsall
- Born: 15 January 1921; Kenilworth, Warwickshire, England
- Died: 18 March 2013 (aged 92)
- Batting: Right-handed
- Bowling: Right-arm medium-pace

Domestic team information
- Years: Team
- 1947–1948: Cambridge University

Career statistics
Competition	First-class
Matches	15
Runs scored	230
Batting average	15.33
100s/50s	0/1
Top score	80*
Balls bowled	2,142
Wickets	27
Bowling average	36.37
5 wickets in innings	0
10 wickets in match	0
Best bowling	4/51
Catches/stumpings	12/–
- Source: Cricinfo, 28 January 2019

Richard Devenish Pearsall (15 January 1921 – 18 March 2013) was an English cricketer who played first-class cricket for Cambridge University in 1947 and 1948.

Pearsall attended Oundle School and King's College, Cambridge. A medium-pace bowler and lower-order batsman, he played several matches in two seasons after the war for Cambridge University without gaining a Blue.

Pearsall's best bowling figures were 4 for 51 against Free Foresters in 1947, and his highest score was 80 not out against Middlesex in 1948, when he and Barry Pryer added an unbeaten 149 in 90 minutes for the ninth wicket.
