= Laxton Grammar School =

School in Oundle, Northamptonshire, England

Laxton Grammar School was a historic school located in Oundle, Northamptonshire, founded after the death of Sir William Laxton (Lord Mayor of London) in 1556. It was finally subsumed into Oundle School in 2000 under the name Oundle School.

== The Gild School ==
Oundle had a grammar school, called the Gild School, since at least 1485. In 1499, Dame Joan Wyatt had purchased a licence to refound the Gild, properly authorizing its existence. It was to be known as the Gild or Fraternity of the Blessed Virgin Mary and the "Gildhouse" stood within the churchyard of St Peter's parish church. The Gild was affected by the Abolition of Chantries Act and, in 1548 its assets were seized and it was taken over as a grammar school by the Commissioners for the Continuance of Schools.

== Sir William Laxton ==
William Laxton was educated at the Gild School and became an apprentice to the Worshipful Company of Grocers in London, until he gained his livery in 1519. In 1536, Laxton became Upper Master of the Grocer's Company and Lord Mayor of London in 1544.

Sir William Laxton died in 1556 and, in his will, left property to the Grocer's Company in London, on condition that they supported a new school, to replace the old school which he had attended.

== Oundle School ==
Owing to its success, in 1876 headmaster Henry St. John Reade and the Grocers Company decided to split the school into two: "The Laxton Modern School" for local day boys and the renowned “Oundle School”, a public school for pupils intending to progress to university.

In 2000, the governing body decided to reunite Laxton Grammar School into Oundle School as a house for day pupils, to be known as Laxton House.

== 400th anniversary ==
In 1956, Queen Elizabeth The Queen Mother attended Laxton Grammar School's 400-year celebrations. A plaque commemorating this event was installed in the Long Room.

== Notable pupils ==
- Iain Henderson (born 1967), cricketer
