= Walter Wykes =

American playwright (born 1969)

- Born: October 31, 1969 (age 56); Austin, Texas, United States
- Occupation: Playwright

Walter Wykes (born October 31, 1969) is an American playwright. A graduate of the MFA playwriting program at the University of Nevada, Las Vegas, he has had over thirty plays produced across the United States and internationally. Four times he has received the American College Theatre Festival's Award for Excellence in Playwriting.

Wykes is known for writing intense roles and dark subject matter. The bulk of his dramatic work has an absurdist or surrealist bent, creating a dreamlike or nightmarish atmosphere that reflects the sometimes senseless nature of the modern world.

== Plays ==
- The Father Clock (1997)
- The Profession (1997)
- The Salmon Tribunal (1997)
- Borrowed Parts (1998)
- The Lightning-Rod Man (2006)
- Fading Joy (2000)
- The Worker (2007)
- Family 2.0 (2007)
- The Spotted Man (2007)
- The Unwanted (2008)
- Beer Girl (2009)
- The Fly (2010)
- Tainted Love (2010)
- The Secret Origin of Mojo Man (2011)
- Certificate of Death (2012)

== Trivia ==
- From June 1998 to February, Wykes played the role of Ensign Thomas in Star Trek: The Experience, an interactive show at the Las Vegas Hilton.
- He has appeared as an actor in numerous television commercials including spots for Burger King, Dunkin' Donuts, Helio, Best Western, Qwestdex, Long John Silver's, and Domino's Pizza.
