= James Wykes =

English cricketer and schoolmaster

Personal information
- Full name: James Cochrane Wykes
- Born: 19 October 1913; Leigh-on-Sea, Essex, England
- Died: 19 October 1992 (aged 79); Harrogate, Yorkshire, England
- Batting: Right-handed
- Role: Wicket-keeper
- Relatives: Nigel Wykes (brother)

Domestic team information
- Years: Team
- 1946: Scotland

Career statistics
Competition	First-class
Matches	1
Runs scored	38
Batting average	19.00
100s/50s	–/–
Top score	23
Catches/stumpings	1/–
- Source: Cricinfo, 29 October 2022

James Cochrane Wykes (19 October 1913 – 19 October 1992) was an English first-class cricketer and schoolmaster.

Wykes was born at Leigh-on-Sea in October 1913. He was educated at Oundle School, before matriculating to Clare College, Cambridge. After graduating from Cambridge, Wykes became a schoolmaster at Loretto School in Musselburgh. He served in the Second World War with the Black Watch, being commissioned as a second lieutenant in December 1940. He was promoted to the war substantive rank of lieutenant in May 1945, before resigning his commission in November 1947. While teaching in Musselburgh, Wykes played club cricket for Grange in nearby Edinburgh. He was selected to play for the Scottish cricket team in a first-class match against Ireland at Greenock in 1946. Batting twice in the match, he was dismissed for 15 runs in the Scottish first innings by James Boucher, while in their second innings he was dismissed for 23 runs by Robert Barnes. Wykes later became headmaster of St. Bees School in England from 1951 to 1963. He died at Harrogate on his 79th birthday. His brother, Nigel, was also a first-class cricketer.
