= Norman Wykes =

English cricketer

Nigel Wykes
Personal information
- Full name: Norman Gordon Wykes
- Born: 19 March 1906; Woodford, Essex, England
- Died: 4 December 1991 (aged 85); Bridport, Dorset, England
- Batting: Left-handed
- Role: Batsman
- Relatives: James Wykes (brother)

Domestic team information
- Years: Team
- 1925–1936: Essex

Career statistics
Competition	FC
Matches	42
Runs scored	1277
Batting average	23.64
100s/50s	2/4
Top score	162
Balls bowled	270
Wickets	1
Bowling average	150.00
5 wickets in innings	0
10 wickets in match	0
Best bowling	1/5
Catches/stumpings	13/0
- Source: Cricinfo, 21 July 2013

Nigel Wykes (born Norman Gordon Wykes; 19 March 1906 – 4 December 1991) was an English cricketer. He was educated at Oundle School and played for Essex between 1925 and 1936.

He was Eton Housemaster from 1944 to 1960 and a distinguished painter of butterflies and plants.
