= Iain Henderson (cricketer) =

English cricketer

Personal information
- Full name: Iain Mark Henderson
- Born: 8 September 1967 (age 59); Glapthorn, Northamptonshire, England
- Batting: Right-handed
- Bowling: Right-arm medium-fast

Domestic team information
- Years: Team
- 1987–1990: Oxford University
- 1991–1992: Bedfordshire
- 1993–1996: Oxfordshire

Career statistics
| Competition | First-class |
|---|---|
| Matches | 21 |
| Runs scored | 186 |
| Batting average | 10.94 |
| 100s/50s | –/– |
| Top score | 44 |
| Balls bowled | 2,269 |
| Wickets | 25 |
| Bowling average | 61.88 |
| 5 wickets in innings | – |
| 10 wickets in match | – |
| Best bowling | 3/48 |
| Catches/stumpings | 2/– |
- Source: Cricinfo, 24 June 2019

Iain Mark Henderson (born 8 September 1967) is an English former first-class cricketer.

Henderson was born in September 1967 at Glapthorn, Northamptonshire. He later was educated at Laxton Grammar School, before going up to Pembroke College, Oxford. While studying at Oxford he made his debut in first-class cricket for Oxford University against Hampshire at Oxford in 1987. He made twenty further first-class appearances for Oxford, with his final match against Cambridge University coming in 1990. Playing as a right-arm medium-fast bowler, Henderson took 25 wickets at an expensive average of 61.88, with best figures of 3 for 48. With the bat, he scored 186 runs with a high score of 44. In addition to playing first-class cricket, Henderson also played minor counties cricket for Bedfordshire in 1991 and 1992, making three appearances in the Minor Counties Championship and a single appearance in the MCCA Knockout Trophy. He left Bedfordshire at the end of the 1991 season, later playing minor counties cricket for Oxfordshire in eight Minor Counties Championship matches between 1993–96.

After graduating from Oxford he became a schoolteacher, teaching biology at Wellington College, where he was also a housemaster. He is a two time winner of the President's Putter golf tournament, played between former and current blues golfers from Oxford and Cambridge universities, with Henderson winning the tournament in 2004 and 2007.
