= Oundle School =

Public school in England

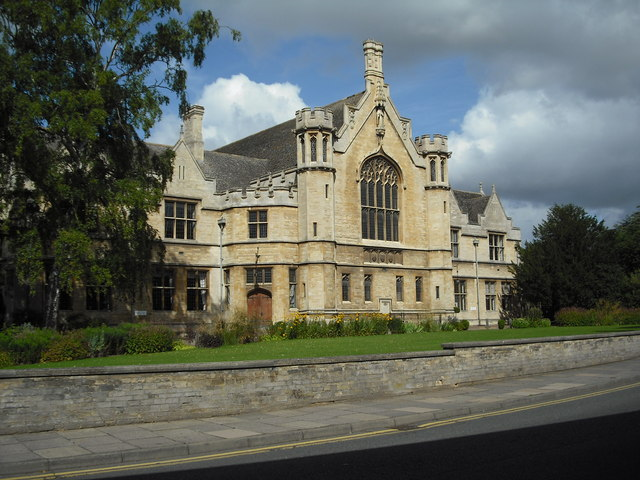

Location
- Oundle, Northamptonshire, PE8 4GH; England; 52.48218°N 0.4691°W

Information
- Type: Public school Private boarding and day school
- Motto: Deus Det Gratiam (Latin for God Grant Grace)
- Religious affiliation: Church of England
- Established: 1556; 470 years ago
- Founder: The Worshipful Company of Grocers
- Department for Education URN: 122129 Tables
- Chairman of Governors: Timothy Coleridge
- Headmaster: Dominic Oliver
- Gender: Co-educational
- Age: 11 to 18
- Enrolment: 1107
- Student to teacher ratio: 8:1
- Campus size: 300-acre (120 ha) (approx)
- Campus type: Semi-rural
- Houses: 15
- Colours: Blue and Maroon
- Budget: £49,808,000 (2024)
- Revenue: £51,672,000 (2024)
- Alumni: Old Oundelians ("OOs")
- Website: www.oundleschool.org.uk

Oundle School is an English public school with day and boarding facilities for pupils 11–18 situated in the market town of Oundle in Northamptonshire, England. The school has been governed by the Worshipful Company of Grocers of the City of London since its foundation by William Laxton in 1556. The school's alumni – known as Old Oundelians – include entrepreneurs, scientists, politicians, military figures and sportspeople.

Oundle has eight boys' houses, five girls' houses, two day houses, a junior house and a junior day house. Together these accommodate more than 1100 pupils, generally between the ages of 11 and 18. It is the third-largest boarding school in England after Eton College and Millfield. The school is a member of the Headmasters' and Headmistresses' Conference and the Rugby Group. As of 2025 the Headteacher is Dominic Oliver, who joined the school in August 2025.

== History ==
=== The medieval guild school ===
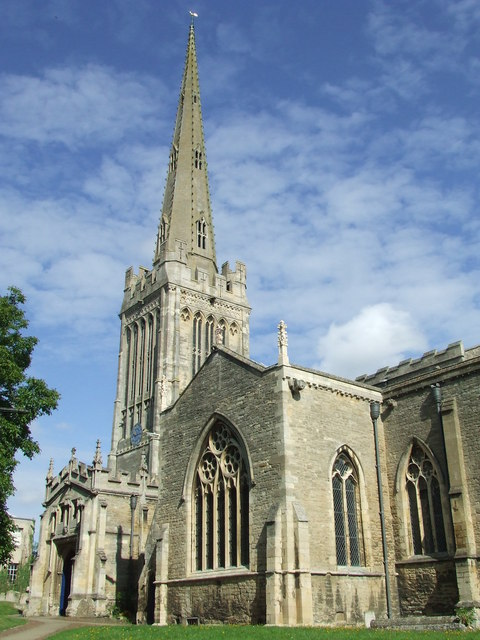
St Peter's Church, where the medieval guild school is believed to have met

Oundle had a school before the English Reformation. The Northamptonshire Historic Environment Record dates the predecessor of Laxton's foundation to the late fifteenth century. Oundle Museum associates the school with the Guild of Our Lady and places its early teaching in part of St Peter's, the parish church. The church's south porch was built for Robert Wyatt and his wife Joan around 1485. Philip Sloan suggests that the room above the porch may have served as a classroom. The exact date when the guild began running the school is uncertain.

The guild held houses and agricultural land as well as a guildhouse beside the churchyard. Its property was seized during the Reformation. In 1548 a commission allowed the school to continue, but the confiscation deprived it of the guild's endowment. Sir William Laxton, whom the school identifies as a former pupil, became a London grocer and served as Lord Mayor of London in 1544. On his death in 1556, he left property in London to the Worshipful Company of Grocers with directions to maintain a free grammar school in Oundle.

=== Laxton's bequest and the Elizabethan school ===
Laxton's codicil provided for a schoolmaster to teach grammar free of charge, an usher to assist him, and lodging and an allowance for seven poor men. The former guildhouse was to serve both purposes, with the schoolroom upstairs and accommodation for the almsmen below. The schoolmaster was to receive £18 a year and the usher £6 13s. 4d.

The school dates its foundation to Laxton's bequest of 1556, though it took years to put into effect. Lady Laxton, born Joan Kirkeby and previously known as Joan Luddington, bought the schoolhouse for £20. After a legal challenge to the codicil, she and the Grocers' Company sealed deeds in May 1573 concerning the maintenance of the school and the transfer of property. On 3 June, the company's representatives took possession of the schoolhouse and the houses of the master and usher. The company's account, transcribed by W. Smalley Law, records that each of the 48 pupils present received a penny to mark the wardens' visit. The historian James Alsop dates the contested foundation to 1573 and credits Lady Laxton with putting the bequest into effect.

When the wardens visited in 1573, the schoolmaster John Sadler had left the teaching to his deputy, Robert Lynacre. The wardens required Sadler to live in Oundle and resume his duties, and appointed Lynacre as usher. They also asked for desks and benches modelled on those at Stamford School and for the five rooms beneath the schoolroom to be divided into seven lodgings. In 1576 the wardens returned with a London clergyman to examine the pupils.

The early statutes, which the company ordered to be formally recorded in 1604, required prospective pupils to read English and Latin and write competently. The school day began with prayers at seven in the morning and ended at five or six in the afternoon, depending on the season. Masters and boys were expected to speak Latin at school. The usher kept a register recording admissions, departures and whether boys proceeded to university. Boarding in the masters' houses was limited to six pupils with the master and three with the usher unless the wardens gave permission for more.

=== Financial Setbacks of the Seventeenth Century ===
In the early seventeenth century, the school drew boys from Oundle, nearby villages and further afield. Some boarded with the schoolmaster or with local families. The earliest surviving pupil register held by the school archive dates from 1626, the year William Dugard began teaching at Oundle as usher. He left in 1630 to become master of Stamford School and later became a printer as well as a schoolmaster.

The school depended on the finances of the Grocers' Company in London, which faced demands for loans from both sides during the English Civil War. In 1666, plague struck Oundle and the Great Fire of London destroyed property that formed part of Laxton's endowment. H. G. Wells described these events as ending a period of prosperity for the school. The company later leased its rebuilt hall to the Bank of England. Under the 1694 agreement, the Bank advanced £5,000 to pay off specified debts of the company.

=== Eighteenth-century recruitment and the growth of boarding ===
Drawing by J Shillibeer, Headmaster 1829-41, showing the new boarding house built in 1799

In 1697 Elizabeth Taylor, whose two sons had attended the school, left meadowland at Warmington in trust. The income was to support a poor pupil and pay for his books, with provision to continue the support through a bachelor's degree if he went on to university. The schoolmaster was to serve as one of the trustees. W. Smalley Law identifies two Oundle boys, Thomas Naylor and William Campion, as later holders of the award.

Recruitment was at times low. Law records only four new pupils in Samuel Murthwaite's first three years as master after his appointment in 1762. In 1765, six local boys entered. Murthwaite also served as an assistant curate. In 1763 Martin Cole of Peterborough built a new house for the schoolmaster near the churchyard. As the number of boarders grew, a dormitory was added in 1799. By 1812 the Reverend John James lived in the enlarged master's house, while lessons still took place upstairs in the former guildhouse.

=== The Chancery case and Stansbury's headship ===
In 1841 townspeople backed a suit in the Court of Chancery over the administration of Laxton's charity. The dispute concerned how much of the income from the London properties had to be spent on the school and its beneficiaries. The properties were reported to yield more than £1,500 a year. In 1843 Lord Langdale ruled in favour of the Grocers' Company, leaving it bound by the obligations of the bequest. The historian David Allsobrook places the suit among similar efforts by townspeople elsewhere in England to secure access to education at endowed schools.

Residents of Laxton Almshouse, the woman believed to be its matron, 1885.

John Fortunatus Stansbury became headmaster in 1848. Under him Oundle gained a reputation for classics and mathematics. By the 1860s the Grocers' Company was contributing to teachers' salaries and the cost of the annual examination. It also paid the school a grant for each pupil, up to a maximum of 100 pupils. In 1855 the old schoolhouse was rebuilt by John Sebastian Gwilt, and the almsmen moved to separate accommodation nearby. The rebuilt schoolhouse later housed Laxton Grammar School.

Pupil numbers fell in the later years of Stansbury's headship. In 1870 he argued for the appointment of a science teacher, pointing to the science provision in the Cambridge examinations for middle-class schools. The Grocers' Company repeatedly rejected his proposals to expand science teaching. The Schools Inquiry Commission and the Endowed Schools Act 1869 formed part of the wider context for reform, and by 1875 the Charity Commission had indicated that it intended to take up the reform of Oundle.

=== Division into Oundle School and Laxton Grammar School ===
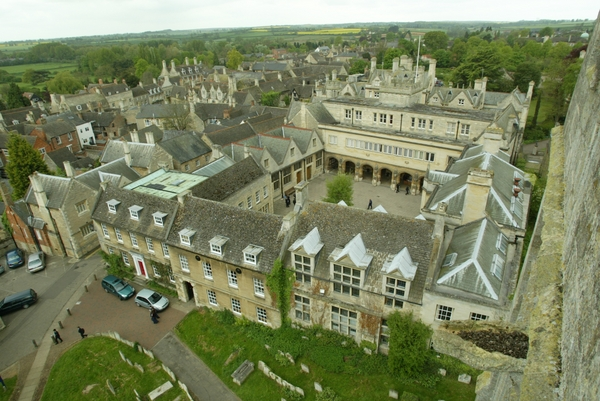
The Cloisters, viewed from the spire of St Peter's Church

Henry St John Reade succeeded Stansbury in 1876. That summer he proposed dividing the school and presented his plan at a public meeting in Oundle. The Grocers' Company accepted his proposals for separate schools and extensions to the buildings. The two schools began operating separately in September 1876. The Classical School, later Oundle School, prepared pupils for university and attracted boarders from outside the district. The Modern School, later Laxton Grammar School, offered a shorter course of study and mainly served Oundle and the surrounding district. Both schools initially admitted day pupils and boarders.

After Reade proposed a fee increase in 1881, some townspeople raised concerns about access for local boys. In 1882 the Grocers' Company reconsidered the division and discussed creating a single school with classical and modern courses. It decided to keep the two schools and made provision for local boys to enter the Classical School on favourable financial terms. By 1883 the Classical School had moved into the Cloisters and the Modern School had moved into the rebuilt schoolhouse.

Historic England dates the New Street front of the Cloisters, designed by John Sebastian Gwilt and incorporating a statue of Laxton, to around 1880. Reade was dismissed in 1883.

The Charity Commission examined the arrangements again in 1886–87. Assistant commissioner W. N. Bruce visited Oundle and reviewed the schools' finances, admissions and courses. David Allsobrook's study of the commission's records found that the Grocers' Company had divided the school without securing formal approval. Bruce's report remained unpublished, and the commission took no formal action against the company.

=== Sanderson's reforms ===
According to S. G. Squire, who later taught at Oundle under Sanderson, enrolment fell from about 200 boys under Reade to about 90 by 1892, a loss of more than half. The Grocers' Company asked candidates for the headship to submit proposals for reorganising the curriculum. It appointed Frederick William Sanderson, who had taught physics at Dulwich College, despite opposition within the company. Squire also recalled resistance from some staff and pupils during Sanderson's early years. According to Wells, enrolment recovered slowly at first, reaching about 120 by 1900 before growing more rapidly.

Oundle School engineering workshop about 1910

By the time Sanderson died in 1922, the school had more than 500 pupils. During his headship the school added classrooms, boarding houses, laboratories, engineering workshops, a foundry and an experimental farm. Oundle Museum identifies the Great Hall, the science block and several houses on Milton Road among the developments of this period. The Great Hall on New Street, designed by Arthur Conran Blomfield, is dated 1907.

Oundle School new science block 1914

Sanderson used practical work to connect mathematics and science with engineering. Wells describes pupils working in groups and using classroom mathematics to solve problems in the laboratories and workshops. In 1905 pupils machined and assembled a small reversing engine using drawings and castings supplied by the North Eastern Marine Engineering Works. At the school's science exhibitions, pupils prepared experiments in chemistry, biology and mechanics and explained their work to visitors.

The Oundle School Physics Laboratory about 1910

Sanderson gave engineering and practical science a place alongside classical studies. His reforms also extended to other subjects. A contemporary obituary in Nature described Oundle pupils researching history and literature in the school library, performing adaptations of Shakespeare in English lessons and learning modern languages through the direct method. The obituary credited Sanderson with influencing science education in Britain. Allsobrook later placed his reforms in the wider development of secondary education in England and Wales.

A former Oundle teacher, G. W. Olive, went on to become headmaster of Dauntsey's School. The New Zealand educator L. J. Wild linked Olive's introduction of new laboratories, workshops and field activities at Dauntsey's to his experience at Oundle. Sanderson died in June 1922 after addressing the National Union of Scientific Workers. Wells, whose sons had attended Oundle, described Sanderson's ideas and methods in The Story of a Great Schoolmaster, published in 1924.

=== The First World War and commemoration ===
Sir Alf. Yarrow, funded Yarrow Gallery

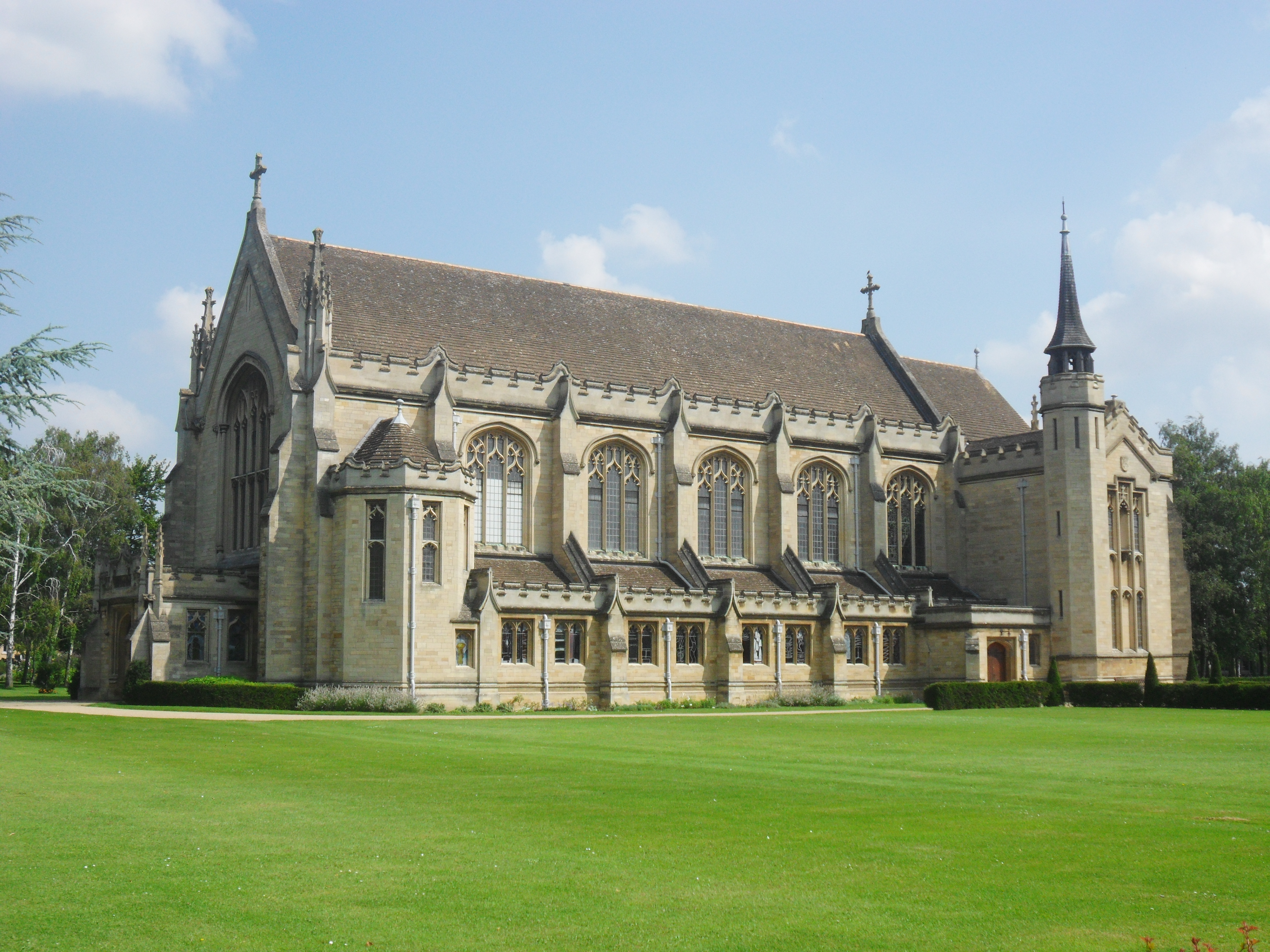
The Memorial Chapel, consecrated in 1923

During the First World War, pupils made parts for the War Office in the school workshops and used the school grounds to grow crops and rear pigs. In 1918 the Yarrow Gallery opened as a museum, funded by the shipbuilder Sir Alfred Yarrow in memory of his son Eric, a former pupil killed at Ypres in 1915.

In 1917 parents and former pupils discussed creating a memorial to the war dead. The resulting Perpendicular Gothic chapel, designed by Arthur Conran Blomfield, was consecrated in 1923. It is a Grade II* listed building.

=== Kenneth Fisher, the royal charter and the Second World War ===
Kenneth Fisher succeeded Sanderson in 1922. He inherited a school that had expanded rapidly, with several boarding houses adapted from existing homes. Under Fisher the houses were rewired and their drainage was improved. A power house opened at Home Close in 1925, supplying electricity and providing a place to teach applied physics. Laxton Grammar School closed its boarding house in 1929 as improved motor transport made daily travel easier. Oundle School received a royal charter in 1930.

Preparations for air raids began at the time of the Munich Agreement in 1938. The school archive holds correspondence about pupils helping to build shelters for their boarding houses and parents being charged for materials. During the Second World War, the workshops took on war work and pupils helped local farmers with harvesting and threshing. The boarding houses maintained the blackout. The school accommodated more pupils by adding beds and using former Laxton boarding accommodation. W. G. Walker records 581 pupils in 1941 and 652 in 1945.

Cobthorne, Permanent Residence for Heads of Oundle School

Fisher retired in 1945 and was succeeded by Graham Stainforth, previously a housemaster at Wellington College. Cobthorne, a seventeenth-century house, became the headmaster's permanent residence that year. The school's memorial book for the Second World War lists more than 2,000 Oundelians and includes 272 obituaries. In 1955–56 stained glass designed by John Piper and made with Patrick Reyntiens was installed around the apse of the Memorial Chapel.

=== Laxton, coeducation and reunification ===
Laxton continued to serve local families while Oundle School drew boarders from a wider area. The opening of Prince William School in 1971 began a gradual end to state funding for Laxton pupils. The last state-assisted intake entered in 1990, when Laxton Grammar School became known as Laxton School.

The two schools shared facilities for much of their separate existence, and some Laxton pupils joined Oundle School classes from the age of sixteen. The decision to make both schools coeducational was taken in 1988, when girls joined Laxton's sixth form. In 1990, under headmaster David McMurray, Oundle began admitting girls, and Kirkeby and Wyatt opened to accommodate the first girls to board. The two schools combined their sports programmes in 1992.

A supplementary royal charter was granted in 1999. In 2000 the Grocers' Company formally united the schools under the name Oundle School and retained the name Laxton for a senior day house. The old Laxton foundation remained a separate registered charity until its assets were transferred to the Corporation of Oundle School and the Charity Commission removed it from the register on 5 October 2010. In 2023 the former Laxton Grammar School premises were reconfigured to accommodate two day houses, Laxton and Sadler. The latter was named after the early schoolmaster John Sadler.

=== Twenty-first century ===
In November 2005 the school was found to have taken part in a cartel of price fixing among public schools. However, Jean Scott, the head of the Independent Schools Council, said that independent schools had always been exempt from anti-cartel rules applied to business, were following a long-established procedure in sharing the information with each other, and that they were unaware of the change to the law (on which they had not been consulted). She wrote to John Vickers, the OFT Director General, saying, "They are not a group of businessmen meeting behind closed doors to fix the price of their products to the disadvantage of the consumer. They are schools that have quite openly continued to follow a long-established practice because they were unaware that the law had changed."

Science Block At Oundle School

The first phase of the SciTec science complex opened in 2007. The project was completed in 2016 with facilities for mathematics, design and engineering, including the Patrick Engineering Centre. The school described the project as a continuation of Sanderson's approach to teaching science and engineering together.

In September 2015, Sarah Kerr-Dineen succeeded Charles Bush as head of Oundle School, becoming the first woman to lead the school since its foundation in 1556. She had previously served as Warden of Forest School in London.

During her headship, Oundle helped launch the Oundle, Peterborough and East Northants (OPEN) Learning Partnership, which brought together independent and state schools in the area. Kerr-Dineen and Liz Dormor, principal of Prince William School, gave a joint presentation at the launch in Oundle's Great Hall. Kerr-Dineen retired in 2025 and was succeeded by Dominic Oliver.

== School Life ==
Oundle has 835 boarders and 235 day pupils. It is the third largest independent boarding school in England, after Eton in Berkshire and Millfield in Somerset. The various school buildings, some of which date from the 15th century, are scattered around the market town, with the Cloisters acting as the nucleus of the school community.

The Good Schools Guide described the school as a "Popular, well oiled, well heeled co-educational boarding school which is riding high". Pupils obtain strong results at GCSE and A Level. In their 2013 A Levels pupils achieved 89.1% A* to B grades, with over 60% of grades either A* or A. In the year 2016, 28 pupils achieved 10 or more A* results in their GCSE examinations, with 89% of all results awarded being A* or A. In 2019, 48% of pupils scored A*-A for their A-Levels examination, whereas 79% scored A*-A for their GCSEs.

The school promotes the practice of Christian values and maintains links with the Church of England by celebrating the major events of the Christian calendar. All pupils who board are required to attend services in the school chapel three times a week: one midweek morning service, Friday hymn practice, and the Sunday service. Pupils of other faiths are free to worship according to their own beliefs but must attend chapel with the rest of the school.

The school has a programme of voluntary clubs and societies (approaching 50 in number), which range from poetry and debating to croquet and wine tasting. Each academic subject also has its own society which organises evening lectures from guest speakers throughout the year. A new subject, Trivium, gives third form pupils timetabled engagement with extension topics for their own sake, using methods of thought drawn from the traditional liberal arts. Quadrivium is also an option for pupils in the lower sixth to study, similar to trivium taught in the third form. Outside term-time, pupils can participate in school trips to other countries. These include history trips to European cities, language exchanges in Europe and Asia, charity work in Africa, AAAS conventions and politics trips in America and natural history expeditions to Antarctica. In 2025, the head of modern foreign languages said in The Times that "Language exchange trips have largely disappeared".

Although there are other sports to choose from, the school's emphasis remains on team sports such as rugby, hockey, cricket, rowing and soccer for boys, and hockey, netball and tennis for girls. Oundle performs strongly in independent school rugby, cricket, and girls' hockey. The school sends regular rugby, cricket and hockey tours to other countries, while the social 'Ramblers' cricket team tours the U.K. and the Caribbean. The Oundle Rovers Cricket Club (made up of Old Oundelians) plays in The Cricketer Cup and hosts its own cricket week at the school. The Rovers have won the cup three times and are fourth in the all-time order of merit.

Over 60% of pupils practise a musical instrument while at Oundle. The school has groups, bands, orchestras and choirs performing different kinds of music. Some pupils have gone on to receive musical or choral scholarships from universities, and school bands and choirs have performed concerts across the UK, Europe and Asia. The school's rock music society had Bruce Dickinson among its earliest members; 'Roc-Soc' has been running since the 1970s and promotes the independent formation of popular music bands which have their own dedicated concerts towards the end of every term. The experimental/industrial music pioneers Throbbing Gristle played at the school in 1980.

Oundle School has the largest Combined Cadet Force of any school in the country, and it is involved in the annual Remembrance Day service held in St Peter's Church. The school has a tradition of serving the community with many pupils opting to provide assistance in the local area, or Community Action as an alternative to CCF. Many pupils choose to undertake the Duke of Edinburgh Award Scheme. Every summer since 1982 sixth formers and former pupils have run the Oundle School Mencap holiday, a residential holiday for children with a range of learning disabilities and now a charity in its own right.

Oundle won the Tatler Public School of the Year Award in 2018.

== Facilities ==
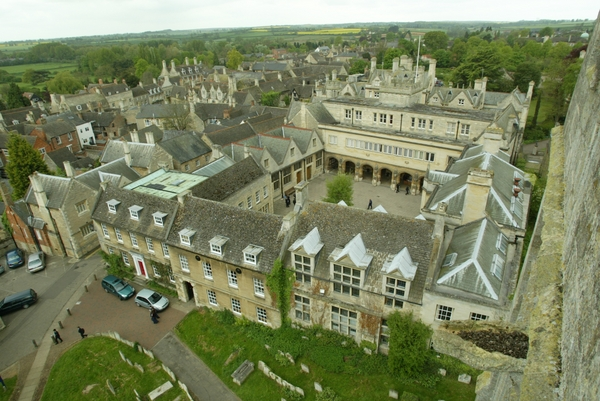
The Cloisters viewed from the spire of St Peter's Church

There are teaching buildings located throughout the town which house classrooms, studios and science and language laboratories. Many lessons take place in the Cloisters which are located in the heart of the town, and other main teaching buildings include the Adamson Centre, the Gascoigne, the Needham, Old Dryden, the Patrick Centre and SciTec.

The school has numerous sporting facilities which cater for a wide variety of different sports. Among these are four sand-filled astroturf pitches, a six lane synthetic athletics track, a swimming pool and over twenty tennis courts. The Sports Centre houses two fully equipped sports halls, indoor squash and fives facilities, a climbing wall and well equipped gymnasia. All of these have been rebuilt or refurbished in recent years. There are also extensive playing fields and boating facilities on the nearby River Nene, as well as sailing at Rutland Sailing Club.

There are a number of Combined Cadet Force (CCF) buildings including the Armoury (the main administrative building and rifle store), two shooting ranges, and various other smaller buildings used primarily for rifle and first aid training. Situated approximately two miles from Oundle, outside the hamlet of Elmington on the Ashton estate, is Oundle School's full bore outdoor range. At 500 yards (460 m) long, the range is one of the few of its size in the country to be owned by a school. Rifles can be fired from firing points at either 100, 200, 300 or 500 yards (460 m). There is another, smaller .22 shooting range situated next to the school armoury which is used for day to day use.

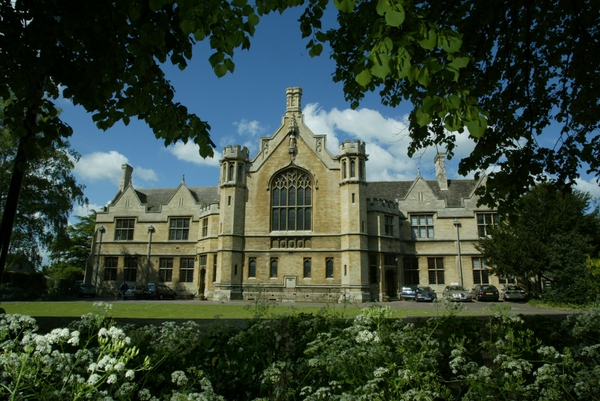
The Great Hall

=== Great Hall ===
The Great Hall was constructed in 1907, with the North and South Wings added shortly afterwards. The Great Hall is located prominently in the centre of the town adjacent to the Cloisters and School House; it is used for a variety of functions throughout the year including concerts, receptions, lectures, debates and assemblies. The building also houses the offices of the Headmaster and the school admissions department.

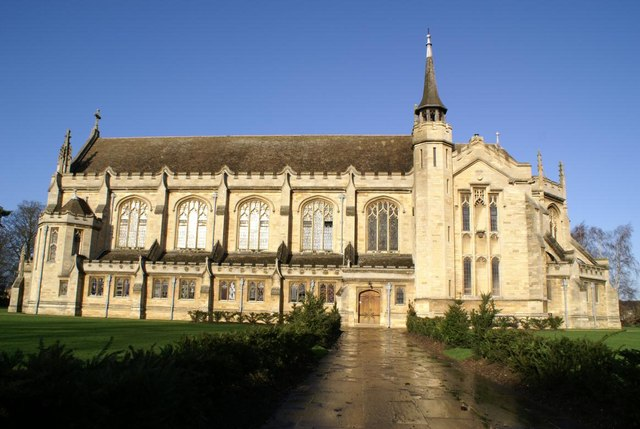
The Chapel of St Anthony

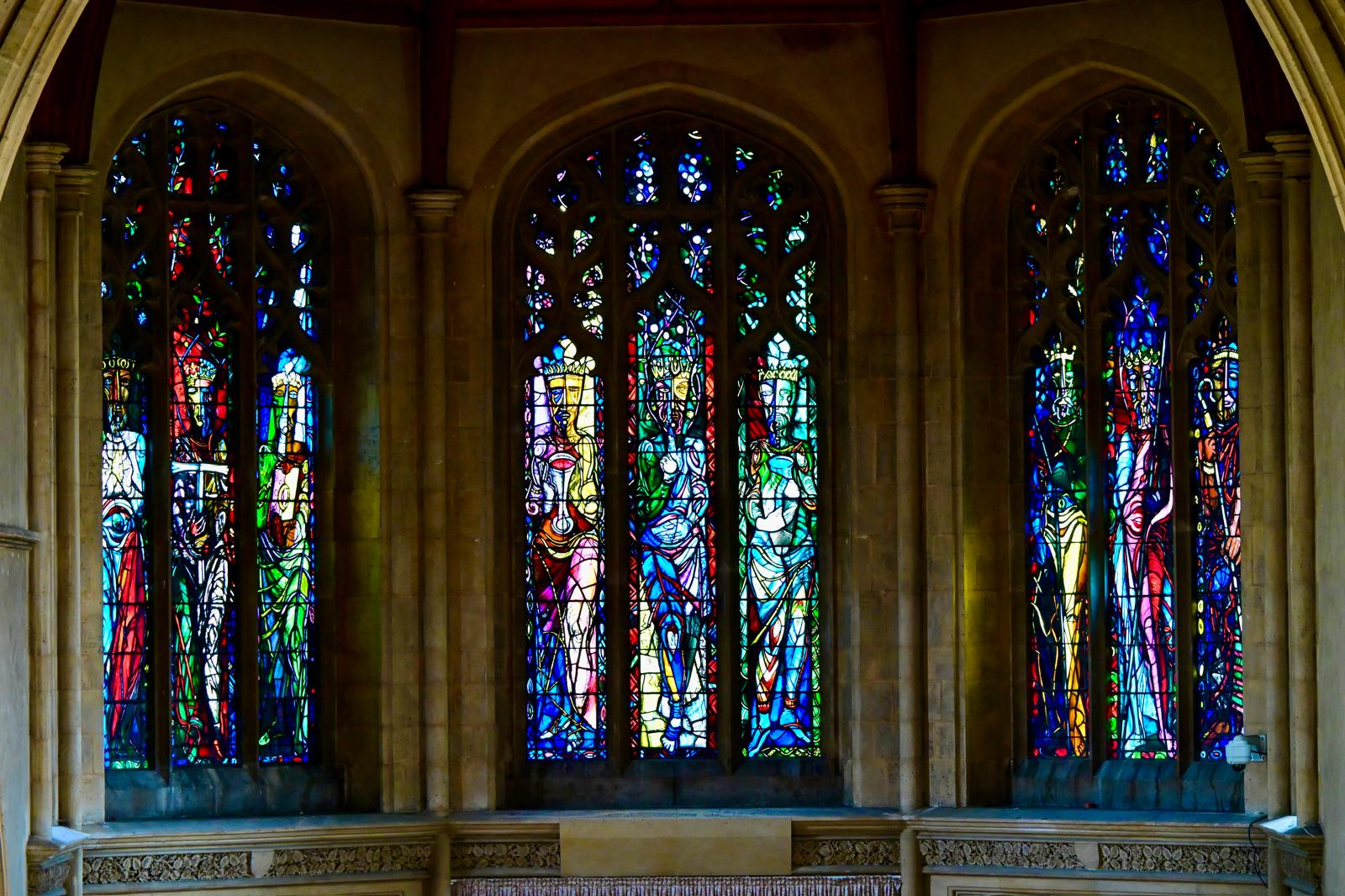
Apse windows in the Chapel by John Piper and Patrick Reyntiens

=== Chapel of Saint Anthony ===
The Chapel of Saint Anthony, consecrated in 1923, was built as a memorial to the 221 Old Oundelians who were killed during the First World War. It is where the school community meets, linking past and present, and bearing witness, both in itself and in its art and worship, to the abiding values of the Christian Faith. The chapel is a freestanding late Perpendicular Gothic Revival style building designed by Arthur Conran Blomfield, son of architect Sir Arthur Blomfield. Its nave is flanked by low aisles and a tall clerestory that floods the interior with light, while the east end is formed of polygonal apse surrounded by low ambulatory. In the ambulatory are roll of honour tablets listing the names of all the fallen. They were designed by Bertram Clough Williams-Ellis, the architect of Portmeirion and an Old Oundelian. Between the tablets are seven stained glass windows depicting the seven Ages of Man from perspective of an Oundle schoolboy. They were made by Hugh Easton and installed in 1949. In 1956, to celebrate school’s 400th anniversary, the Grocers’ Company commissioned John Piper - already a renowned artist but not yet a stained glass designer - to design three new windows for the sanctuary. Patrick Reyntiens was recruited to interpret Piper’s modernist designs in glass, which took over three years, so beginning a professional partnership that would last the next three decades and see Piper and Reyntiens complete around 60 stained glass commissions together, among the most notable of which are those for Coventry Cathedral, Liverpool Metropolitan Cathedral and Washington National Cathedral. Immediately recognised for their innovative style, the windows depict Christ in nine forms, from north to south: The Way, Truth and Life; the True Vine, Bread and Water; and the Judge, Teacher and Shepherd. The window in the north chapel was installed in 1997 as a memorial to school's former music teacher, Mark Honeyball. Made by Paul Quail, it shows St Cecelia playing a lap harp, whilst angels descend from heaven with sheets of music. To mark the millennium, Mark Angus was commissioned to provide 32 brightly coloured windows for the nave, 16 to each side in 8 pairs. They were installed between 2002 and 2005. The windows in the south aisle shows scenes from the Order of Creation, while those in the north aisle illustrate biblical history from Genesis to the Passion of Jesus. Four windows in the antechapel, also by Angus, depict a host of angels, and four more in the west porch depicting saints associated with the Grocer's Company. The chapel houses two organs, a classical instrument built in 1984 by Frobenius of Denmark has three manuals and pedals, thirty-five speaking stops and mechanical action. It is situated in the Gallery at the West end. An electronic instrument installed by Copeman Hart in 2000 and situated at the East end of the Chapel provides accompaniment for the Chapel Choir, and leads the whole school singing. It has three manuals and pedals with a West end solo division.

=== Yarrow Gallery ===
The Yarrow Gallery is the school's private art gallery, donated in 1918 by the shipbuilder Sir Alfred Yarrow in memory of his son, Eric, who was killed at the Second Battle of Ypres. The gallery puts on approximately half a dozen exhibitions every year. The space is adaptable and suitable for activities such as poetry readings, plays and small concerts as well as exhibitions. The purpose of the museum is that it should house a collection of pictures, specimens and models to illustrate "the history, development and beauty of the various branches of knowledge". The genealogical tree of the aeroplane and the Durham miner were charted and exhibits such as the skeleton of the white horse which used to draw the School ambulance to the Sanatorium were featured. The statue by Kathleen Scott entitled Here Am I, Send Me is erroneously held to be modelled on her son Peter Scott.

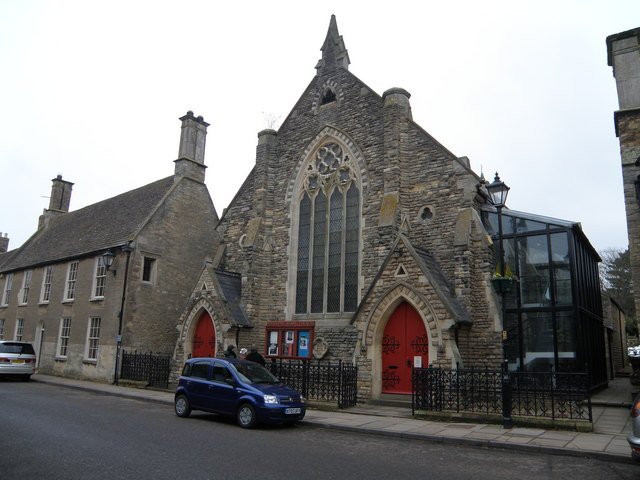
The Stahl Theatre

=== Stahl Theatre ===
The Stahl Theatre opened in 1980 and runs from a converted church on West Street; it can seat an audience of over 400. The Stahl Theatre is owned and managed by Oundle School, run by the Drama Department staff, many of whom have a professional theatre background. It houses both the School productions and visiting professional theatre companies.

=== Patrick Engineering Centre ===
The Patrick Engineering Centre specialises in design technology, automobile engineering and other manual crafts. The school has had a strong reputation for science and engineering since the days of F. W. Sanderson, and this is reflected in the excellent facilities and equipment located within these buildings. Opened in 1998 after a generous donation from an old boy, the Patrick Centre plays an important role in the academic and extra-curricular activities of many pupils. Year after year Oundelians continue to build cars and other forms of automobile, the parts of which are manufactured almost entirely in the workshops.

=== Cripps Library ===
The Cripps Library was opened in 1988. It houses approximately 22,000 books encompassing all subjects. The Library is staffed throughout the school day and is open to the whole school for research, information or borrowing for academic work and leisure reading. The library was completely refurbished in 2011, with study spaces named in honour of inspirational former teachers at the school. The Peter Ling Room houses the new display cabinets for the Greek pots, the Dudley Heesom Room has been equipped with computer projection facilities for classes and meetings, the Rare Book Room now houses the rare book collection in sycamore cabinets.

=== School Archive ===
The School Archive is located in the old stables at Cobthorne House. It conserves an increasingly wide-ranging collection of photographs, newspaper cuttings, publications and record books relating to the school's history, the most notable being the earliest register of pupils of 1626.

=== SciTec ===
SciTec first phase of a new science and technology centre was completed in summer 2007. In September 2007 it was officially opened by the Duke of Gloucester. The project in total cost around £20 million. SciTec was the School's millennium project which upon completion was intended to create a distinctive, new centre to combine the Sciences, Art and Design and Technology. The first stage houses the Chemistry and Biology departments. In 2016, the sci-tec building was extended to house the maths department on the ground floor and first floor, including laboratories for students to use to conduct their own experiments for an EPQ. The Patrick Engineering Centre for Design, Engineering and Technology opened in the same year, marking the completion of the project.

== Notable alumni ==
Former pupils are known as Old Oundelians and the Old Oundelians Club (known as the OO Club) was founded in 1883.

Former pupils of the school include Professor Maxwell Hutchinson, Past President of the Royal Institute of British Architects, Supreme Court Justices of the United Kingdom David Richards, and David Kitchin, evolutionary biologist and science writer Richard Dawkins, rock musician Bruce Dickinson, England rugby players (and twins) Tom and Ben Curry, architect Christopher Alexander, and feminist campaigner, researcher and writer Caroline Criado-Perez.

=== Victoria Cross winners ===
Three Old Oundelians were awarded the Victoria Cross for valour in the presence of the enemy during the First World War:

- Alan Jerrard VC
- Cecil Leonard Knox VC
- Charles Geoffrey Vickers VC

== Heads ==
- 1876–1883: Henry Reade
- 1883–1884: Rev. Thomas. C. Fry
- 1885–1892: Rev. Mungo Travers Park
- 1892–1922: Frederick William Sanderson (1857–1922)
- 1922–1945: Kenneth Fisher, previously senior science master at Eton
- 1945–1956: Graham Henry Stainforth, later head of Wellington College
- 1956–1968: Richard Knight
- 1968–1984: Barry Trapnell
- 1984–1999: David McMurray
- 1999–2005: Ralph Townsend
- 2005–2015: Charles Bush, previously head of Eastbourne College
- 2015–2025: Sarah Kerr-Dineen, former Warden of Forest School, Walthamstow
- 2025– : Dominic Oliver, previously head of Lancing College

== Notable masters ==
- W. G. Grace Jr (1874–1905), eldest son of W. G. Grace
- Ian Hepburn (1902–1974), botanist, ecologist and author. Master for 39 years; Housemaster of Laxton House; Second Master; retired 1964. The Hepburn Music Competition is named after him
- Kevin Walton GC DSC (1918–2009), taught workshop engineering at the school
- David Carpanini (born 1946), taught Art at the school
- Terry Cobner (born 1946), former Wales and British Lions rugby union player
- John Olver (born 1961), former England rugby international
- Simon Hodgkinson (born 1962), former England rugby international
- Douglas Robb (born 1970), a housemaster at the school, later head of Oswestry and Gresham's School
- John Crawley (born 1971), former England cricket player, teaches History
- Daniel Grewcock MBE (born 1972), former England rugby international
- Richard Howitt (born 1977), Housemaster and former cricketer

== School song ==
The official school song is Carmen Undeliense (words by R. F. Patterson, music by Clement M. Spurling, published in 1912 by Novello & Co of London).
