= SDCC =

SDCC may refer to:

== Organizations ==
=== San Diego ===
- San Diego Christian College, a private, evangelical university in El Cajon, California
- San Diego City College, a public, two-year community college in San Diego, California
- San Diego Comic-Con, an annual comic book convention and entertainment event in San Diego, California
- San Diego Convention Center, the primary convention center in San Diego, California
- San Diego Country Club, a golf club in Chula Vista, California

=== Elsewhere ===
- South Dartmoor Community College, a co-educational State Comprehensive Trust School located in Ashburton, Devon, England
- South Dublin County Council, Ireland
- Stoke Damerel Community College, a maths and computing college on Somerset Place in Stoke, Plymouth, England
- Sutherland District Cricket Club, a cricket club of Sutherland, Sydney, Australia
- Southern Desert Correctional Center

== Technology ==
- Secure Direct Client-to-Client, an IRC-related sub-protocol
- Small Device C Compiler, an open source, partially retargetable C compiler for microcontrollers
