= Michael Squire =

British art historian and classicist

Michael James Squire FBA
- Born: 1980 (age 45–46); Aylesbury, England
- Awards: Fellow of the British Academy (2022)

Academic background
- Education: Trinity College, Cambridge (BA, MPhil, PhD); Harvard University
- Thesis: Visual and verbal interactions in Graeco-Roman antiquity (2006)

Academic work
- Discipline: Classical archaeology
- Sub-discipline: Art history and aesthetics
- Institutions: King's College London; LMU Munich; Humboldt University of Berlin; Stanford University; University of Cambridge

Michael Squire FBA (born 1980) is a British art historian and classicist. He became the Laurence Professor of Classical Archaeology in the University of Cambridge in 2022. He is a Senior Research Fellow at Trinity College, and was elected Fellow of the British Academy in 2022.

Squire has research interests in ancient Greek and Roman culture, the legacy of classical art and the history of Western aesthetics (especially in the German Enlightenment).

== Early life and education ==
Squire studied Classics at Trinity College, Cambridge. After graduating with a starred first and completing an M.Phil in classical archaeology, he studied comparative literature as a Knox Fellow at Harvard University. He returned to the University of Cambridge to complete his PhD on ‘Visual and Verbal interactions in Graeco-Roman Antiquity’. In 2006 he took up a Junior Research Fellowship at Christ's College, Cambridge, and later obtained a Humboldt Research Fellowship to study at LMU Munich and the Humboldt University of Berlin.

== Academic career ==
Squire was appointed as Lecturer in Classical Greek Art at King's College London in 2011, then Reader (2015) and Professor (2018). He was Director of Research in the Department of Classics from 2016 to 2022. He was elected Laurence Professor of Classical Archaeology in 2021.

Squire has held fellowships at the Humboldt University of Berlin, the University of Cologne, LMU Munich, and Stanford University, as well as at the Max Planck Institute for the History of Science, the J. Paul Getty Museum and the Berlin Institute for Advanced Study. He was awarded the Gildersleeve Prize in 2011, and a Philip Leverhulme Prize in 2012. From 2017 he led a project on ‘Modern Classicisms: Ancient Art and Contemporary Artists in Dialogue’, resulting in a London exhibition on 'The Classical Now': the accompanying catalogue was listed among the Times Literary Supplement‘s ‘books of the year’ in 2018.

In July 2022, Squire was elected Fellow of the British Academy (FBA), the UK's national academy for the humanities and social sciences.

== Research interests ==
Squire's research interests are listed as follows: “Greek and Roman material and visual culture; classical literature, culture and thought; ancient attitudes to the body and sensory archaeology; early Christian art and theology; history of aesthetics (especially in eighteenth- and nineteenth-century Germany); cultural history of ornament; classical traditions and the legacies of Greek and Roman art; ekphrasis and visual-verbal relations; materialities of text; disciplinary histories of art history, archaeology and anthropology".

He is editor of a Routledge book series on 'Image, Text and Culture in Classical Antiquity', co-editor of the 'Greek Culture in the Roman World' series for Cambridge University Press, and sits on various journal editorial boards, including Art History.

== Personal life ==
Michael Squire holds both British and German citizenship. He is married with two children, born in 2019 and 2021.

== Selected works ==
- Panorama of the Classical World (with Nigel Spivey; Thames and Hudson / Getty, 2004)
- Image and Text in Graeco-Roman Antiquity (Cambridge University Press, 2009)
- The Art of Art History in Graeco-Roman Antiquity (edited with Verity Platt; 2010 = Arethusa 43.2)
- The Art of the Body: Antiquity and its Legacy (Oxford University Press / I. B. Tauris, 2011)
- The Iliad in a Nutshell: Visualizing Epic on the Tabulae Iliacae (Oxford University Press, 2011)
- Sight and the Ancient Senses (Routledge, 2016)
- The Frame in Classical Art: A Cultural History (edited with Verity Platt; Cambridge, 2017)
- Morphogrammata/The Lettered Art of Optatian: Figuring Cultural Transformations in the Age of Constantine (edited with Johannes Wienand; W. Fink, 2017)
- Rethinking Lessing’s Laocoon: Antiquity, Enlightenment, and the ‘Limits’ of Painting and Poetry (edited with Avi Lifschitz; Oxford University Press, 2017)
- The Embodied Object in Classical Antiquity (edited with Milette Gaifman & Verity Platt; 2018; = Art History 40.3)
- Ornament and Figure in Graeco-Roman Art: Rethinking Visual Ontologies in Classical Antiquity (edited with Nikolaus Dietrich; de Gruyter, 2018)
- Classical ‘Art History’ (edited virtual edition of Art History journal, 2018)
- The Classical Now (edited with James Cahill & Ruth Allen; Elephant, 2018)
- The Art of Hegel's Aesthetics: Hegelian Philosophy and the Perspectives of Art History (edited with Paul A. Kottman; W. Fink, 2018)

Academic offices
Preceded by Martin Millett	Laurence Professor of Classical Archaeology; Cambridge University; 2022–present	Succeeded by Incumbent
