= These had most to give =

1922 sculpture by Kathleen Scott

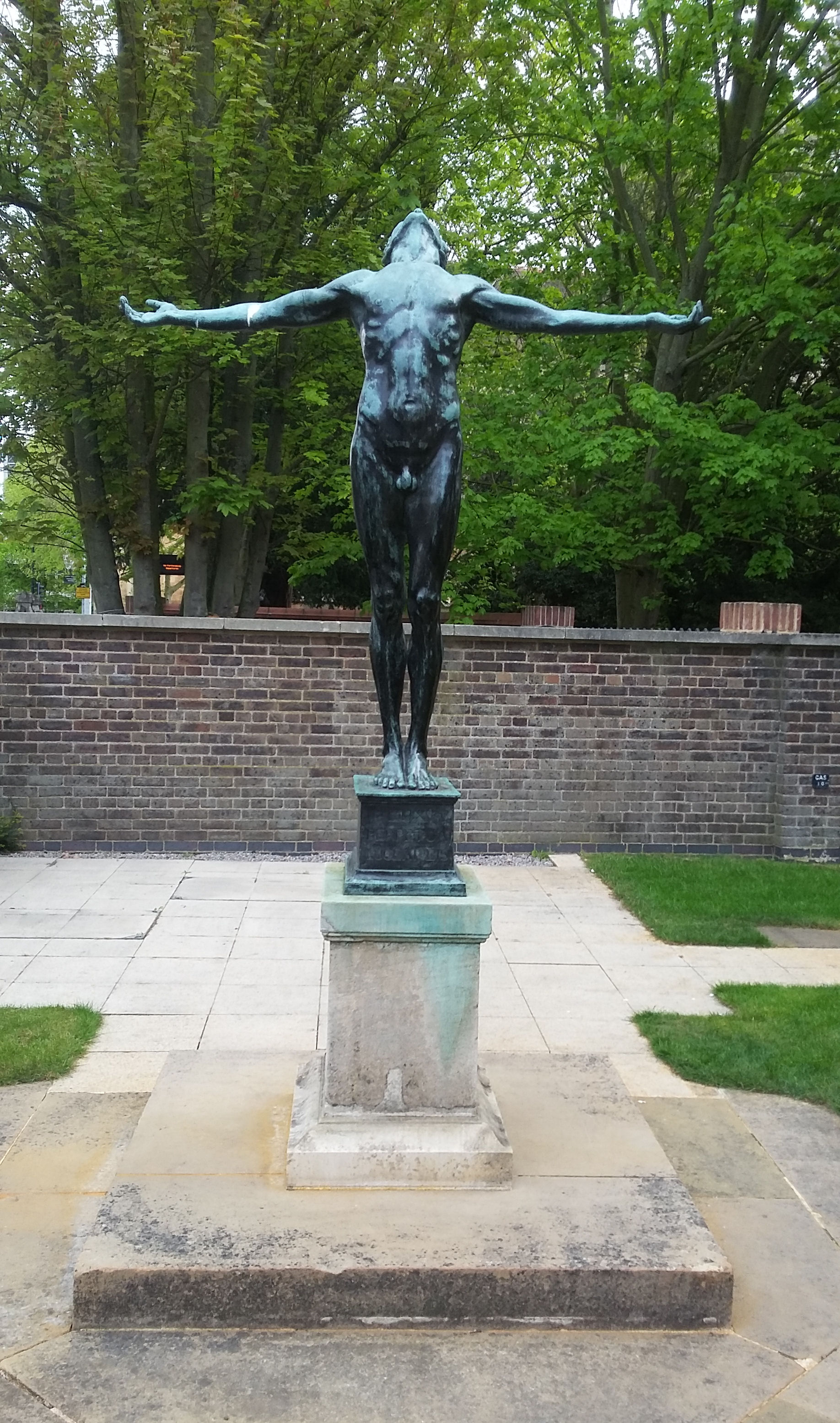
These had most to give, or Youth, in 2017

These had most to give, also known as Youth or May Eternal Light Shine upon Them, is a 1922 life-size bronze statue of a naked male youth that has stood in the garden outside the Scott Polar Research Institute, on Lensfield Road, in Cambridge, since the building opened in 1934. It was made by the British sculptor Kathleen Scott, after whose husband Robert Falcon Scott the institute is named. It stands as a memorial to her husband and to others who died at the British Antarctic Expedition, in 1911–1912.

The sculpture was modelled on A. W. Lawrence. Kathleen Scott's diary records her sculpting his brother T. E. Lawrence in 1921, and then A. W. Lawrence in 1922, when he was aged 22. A.W. Lawrence had studied classics at Oxford, graduating in 1921. He was later Laurence Professor of Classical Archaeology at the University of Cambridge.

The work depicts a slim young man, modelled naturalistically, standing naked on a square bronze plinth, with legs together, arms spread wide, and head tipped back.

It was originally intended to become a war memorial. Scott said in 1927 that it was "expressive of sacrifice, of absolute surrender to ideas, and I intended it to typify the holocaust of youth during the war." Scott exhibited the complete full-size sculpture at Royal Academy Summer Exhibition in 1923, under the title "Offering" and subtitle "1914–1918. These had most to give". It was also exhibited at the Grosvenor Gallery, and at the British Empire Exhibition at Wembley in 1924, and won a bronze medal at the Paris Salon in 1925. Despite Scott's intentions, the sculpture was not selected for a war memorial, and remained on display in Scott's garden in London until 1934.

The sculpture was exhibited at the Fine Art Society in October 1934 under the title "These had most to give", alongside a small bronze model, 454 mm × 398 mm (17.9 in × 15.7 in). It is believed that the model was acquired by Lord Fairhaven at this exhibition in 1934, and it is now held by the National Trust at Anglesey Abbey. The plinth of the model retains the original inscription "THESE HAD / MOST TO GIVE / 1914–1918".

In 1934, Scott offered the full-size sculpture as a gift for the new building of the Scott Polar Research Institute. Some members of the institutes management committee wished to reject the gift, as being too evocative of death, martyrdom and tragedy, rather than scientific research and discovery, but the building's architect Herbert Baker was in favour. Scott's bronze statue of A. W. Lawrence was mounted on a stone base in the garden outside the building when it was officially opened on 20 November 1934. The inscription on the plinth was changed to read: "LUX / PERPETUA / LUCEAT EIS" ("may eternal light shine upon them"), a Latin phrase from the Requiem Mass.

The statue was for many years concealed from casual view behind a high hedge. Renovations to the building in the 1990s, including a much lower hedge, has revealed the statue to passers-by.

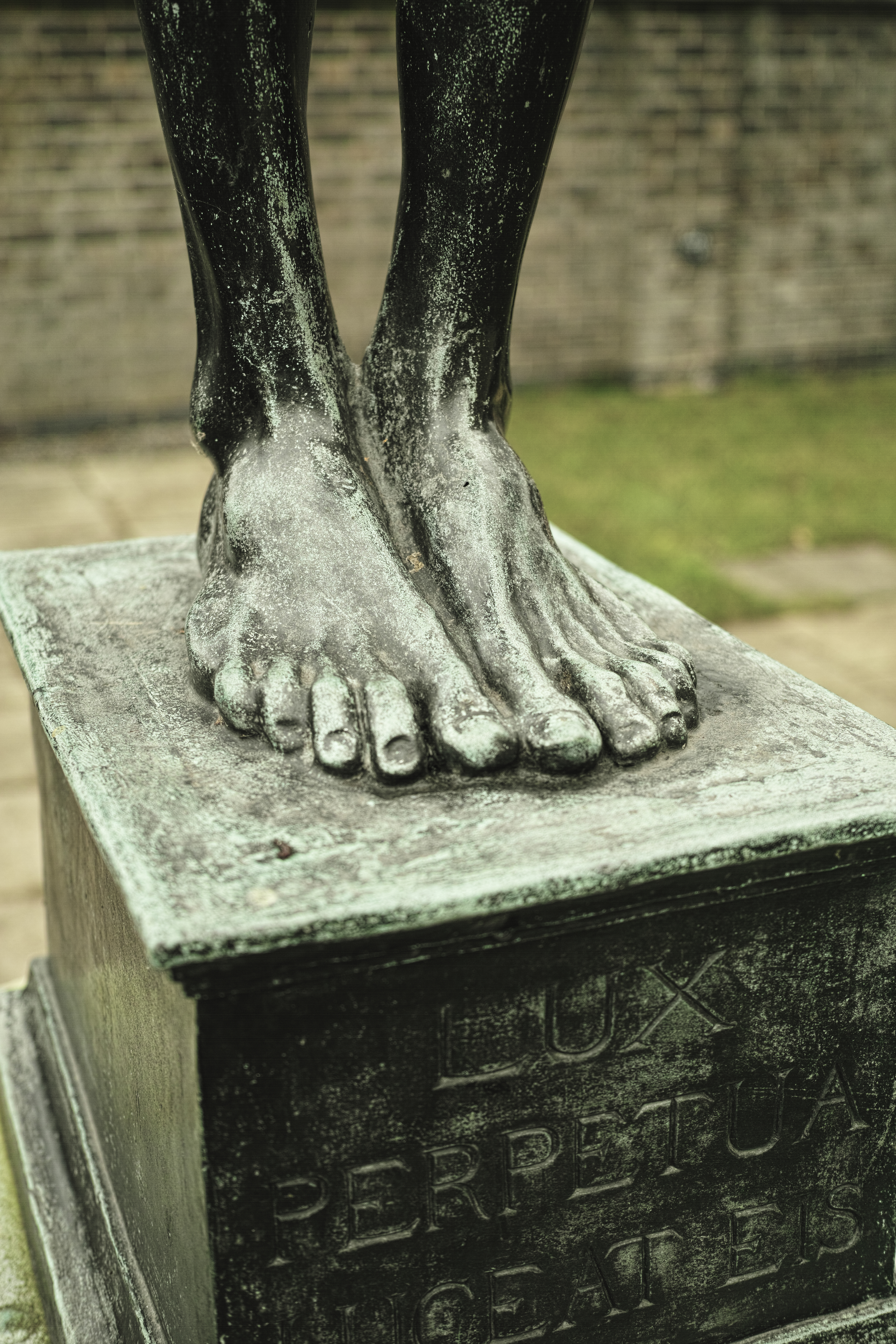
Feet and inscription

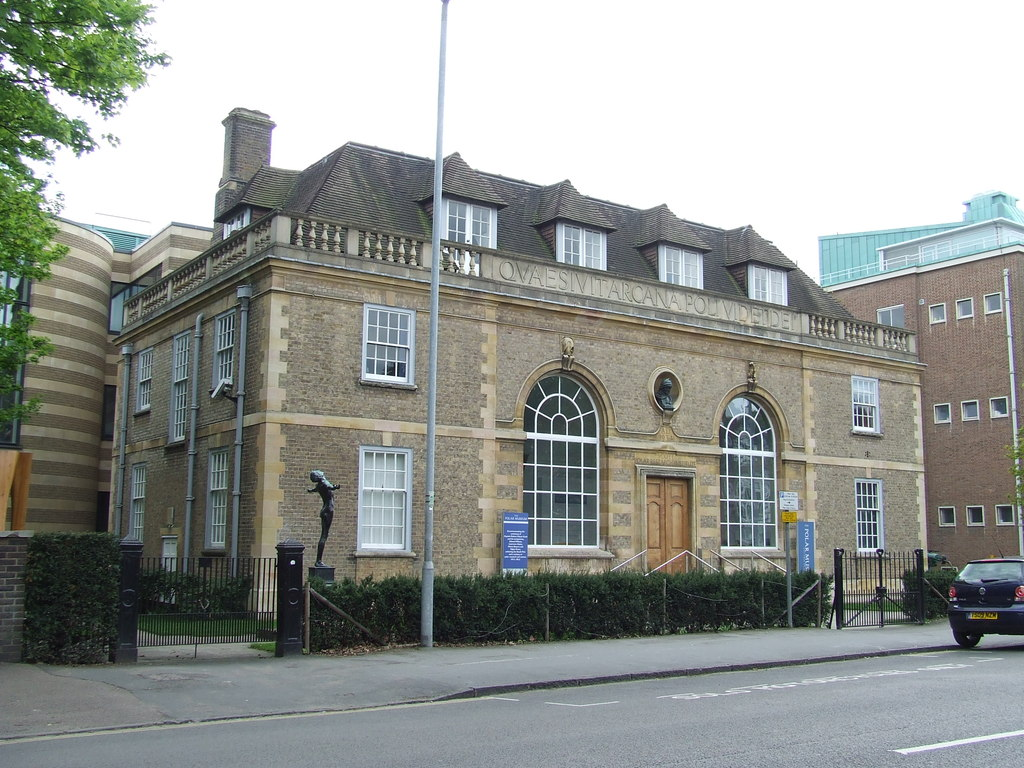
The statue (left) outside the Scott Polar Research Institute, viewed from Lensfield Road in 2012
