= Robert Manuel Cook =

British classical archaeologist (1909–2000)

Robert Manuel Cook FBA
- Born: 4 July 1909; Sheffield, England
- Died: 10 August 2000 (aged 91); Cambridge, England
- Spouse: Kathleen Porter (m. 1938; died 1979)
- Relatives: John Manuel Cook (brother)

Academic background
- Education: Marlborough College; Clare College, Cambridge

Academic work
- Discipline: Classical studies
- Institutions: University of Manchester; University of Cambridge

Robert Manuel Cook FBA (4 July 1909 – 10 August 2000) was a classical scholar and classical archaeologist from England with expertise in Greek painted vases. He was Laurence Professor of Classical Archaeology at the University of Cambridge, the author of several academic texts and was elected a Fellow of the British Academy in 1974, having been made a Fellow of the German Archaeological Institute in 1953.

== Biography ==
Robert Cook was born in Sheffield on 4 July 1909, the son of a clergyman and his wife, the Reverend Charles Robert and Mary Manuel Cook. After a period of home schooling and then boarding school, Cook was educated at Marlborough College between 1923 and 1929, then went up to Clare College, Cambridge, where he graduated with a double first in Classics. He was awarded a Walston scholarship in 1932 and spent the next two years undertaking research in the British School at Athens. In 1946, after pre-war lecturing positions at the University of Manchester and wartime service in the Civil Service, Cook took up the position of Laurence Reader in classical archaeology at Cambridge University, which he held until his elevation in 1962 to the Laurence Chair where he remained until his formal retirement in 1976. Cook published extensively during his career; his Greek Painted Pottery, first published in 1960, with a third edition published in 1997, has been described as "an essential volume in any library on ancient Greece". Photographs attributed to Cook and annotated the British School Athens are held in the Conway Library whose archive, of primarily architectural images, is being digitised under the wider Courtauld Connects project.

In 1938, Cook married Kathleen Porter (d. 1979). The Cooks enjoyed travelling together and, in 1968, they published a joint work, Southern Greece: An Archaeological Guide. His younger brother was John Manuel Cook, also a noted scholar of antiquity.

In retirement Cook acted as chairman of the British School at Athens between 1983 and 1987. He died in Cambridge on 10 August 2000 aged 91.

== Publications ==
- Corpus Vasorum Antiquorum ... British Museum ... Descriptions of the ancient vases in the Department (Corpus Vasorum Antiquorum. Great Britain. fasc. 1, 2, 4, 5, 7, 8, 10, 13.) by Robert Manuel Cook, Edgar John Forsdyke, Frederick Norman Pryce, and Arthur Hamilton Smith ASIN: B0014KZ0KU
- Ionia and Greece in the Eighth and Seventh Centuries B.C (1948) ASIN: B000WUDKT6
- Amasis mepoiesen (Journal of Hellenic Studies), Council of the Society (1949) ASIN: B0007KCI94
- Painted inscriptions on Chiot pottery (Annual of the British School at Athens, MacMillan (1952) ASIN: B0007KCI8U
- A list of Clazomenian pottery (Annual of the British School at Athens, 1952 ASIN: B0007KC2S6
- British Museum (Department of Greek and Roman Antiquities) (Corpus vasorum antiquorum. Great Britain) Printed by order of the Trustees of the British Museum (1954) ASIN: B0007IZ7AS
- Thucydides as archaeologist (Annual of the British School at Athens), MacMillan (1955) ASIN: B0007KCIB2
- Speculations on the origin of coinage Bell & Howell Co., Micro Photo Div (1958) ASIN: B0007HDDGE
- Greek Painted Pottery (Handbooks of archaeology) (1960) Methuen (1960) ASIN: B001OAY67I
- The Greeks till Alexander (Ancient peoples and places series) Thames & Hudson (1962) ASIN: B0000CLAQI
- A hydria of the Campana group in Bonn (with Jaap M. Hemelrijk, Jahrbuch der Berliner Museen), (1963) ASIN: B0007KC2SG
- Niobe and her children (University of Cambridge Inaugural lectures), Cambridge U.P (1964) ASIN: B0000CM3UA
- A corinthianising dinos in Cambridge, " L'Erma " di Bretschneider (1965) ASIN: B0007KCIBC
- Southern Greece: An Archaeological Guide. Attica, Delphi and the Peloponnese, Robert and Kathleen Cook, Faber & Faber (1968) ASIN: B000WULHMS
- A note on the absolute chronology of the eighth centuries and seventh centuries B.C (Annual of the British School of Archaeology at Athens, (1969) ASIN: B0007KBOOY
- 'Epoiesen' on Greek vases (Journal of Hellenic Studies), (1971) ASIN: B0007C95GQ
- Greek Art: Its Development, Character and Influence, Farrar Straus & Giroux (T) (1973) ISBN 0-374-16670-6 ISBN 978-0374166700
- Greek and Roman Pottery (with R.J. Charleston), Kodansha America, Inc (1979) ISBN 0-87011-343-7 ISBN 978-0870113437

Academic offices
Preceded by Jocelyn Toynbee	Laurence Professor of Classical Archaeology Cambridge University; 1962 - 1976	Succeeded by Anthony Snodgrass
