= Kathleen Scott =

British sculptor (1878–1947)

The Right Honourable The Lady Kennet FRBS
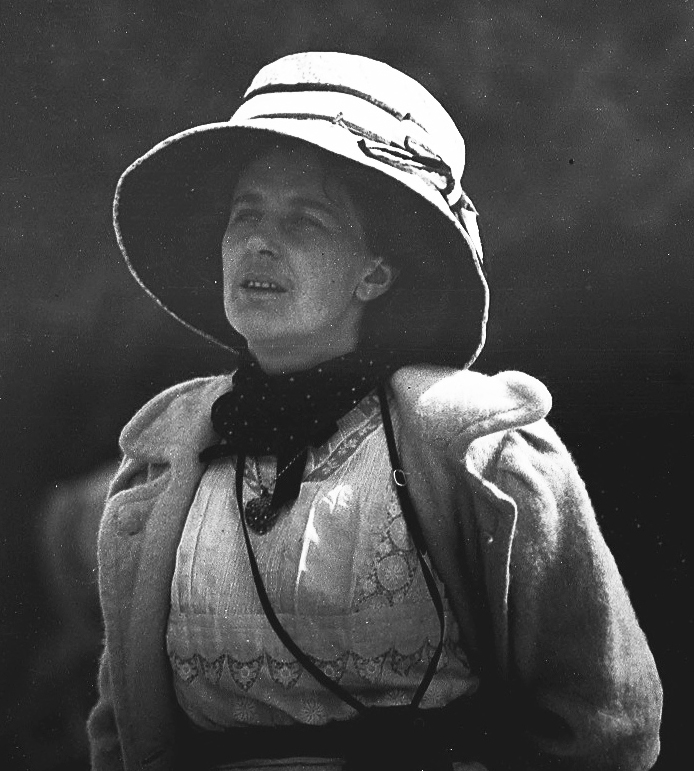
- Scott in 1910
- Born: Edith Agnes Kathleen Bruce; 27 March 1878; Carlton in Lindrick, Nottinghamshire, England
- Died: 25 July 1947 (aged 69); London, England
- Education: Slade School of Fine Art; Académie Colarossi
- Spouses: Robert Falcon Scott (m. 1908; died 1912) Edward Hilton Young (m. 1922)
- Children: Peter Scott; Wayland Young, 2nd Baron Kennet

Edith Agnes Kathleen Young, Baroness Kennet, FRBS (née Bruce; formerly Scott; 27 March 1878 – 25 July 1947) was a British sculptor. Trained in London and Paris, Scott was a prolific sculptor, notably of portrait heads and busts and also of several larger public monuments. These included a number of war memorials, plus statues of her first husband, the Antarctic explorer Captain Robert Falcon Scott. Although the Oxford Dictionary of National Biography describes her as "the most significant and prolific British women sculptor before Barbara Hepworth", her traditional style of sculpture and her hostility to the abstract work of, for example Hepworth and Henry Moore, has led to a lack of recognition for her artistic achievements.

Kathleen Scott was the mother of Sir Peter Scott, the painter and naturalist and of the writer and politician Wayland Young from her second marriage to Edward Hilton Young. She is the grandmother of the sculptor Emily Young and of the writer Louisa Young.

== Biography ==
=== Early life and education ===
Born on 27 March 1878 at Carlton in Lindrick, Nottinghamshire, Kathleen Edith Agnes Bruce was the youngest of the eleven children of the Church of England clergyman Lloyd Stuart Bruce (1829–1886) and his first wife Jane Skene (c. 1828–1880), an amateur artist. An orphan by the age of eight, she was brought up by a relative, William Forbes Skene, in Edinburgh, Scotland, where she attended St George's School before being sent to boarding schools in England, including a convent school run by nuns.

=== Paris and Macedonia ===
Scott studied at the Slade School of Fine Art in London, from 1900 to 1902. Then, with two friends from the Slade, Jessie Gavin and Eileen Gray, Scott enrolled at the Académie Colarossi in Paris. Although she had taken some modelling classes at the Slade, at the Académie Colarossi Scott concentrated on sculpture and within three months had a statuette of a mother and child accepted for the Paris Salon, where it won a medal. She was befriended by Auguste Rodin who, although he was not formally taking students at the time, agreed to mentor her and for Scott to visit his studio on a regular basis. In Paris, Scott also met Aleister Crowley, who wrote several poems about her, Gertrude Stein, Edward Steichen, Isadora Duncan and, very briefly, Pablo Picasso. Scott and Duncan became friends and in 1903 travelled to Belgium and the Netherlands together.

In December 1903, following the Ilinden uprising Scott joined a relief mission to Macedonia, undertaking logistic duties and some basic nursing work at refugee camps. There, in February 1904, Scott fell ill with a life-threatening bout of influenza and, possibly, typhoid. When she recovered she decided to return to Paris and boarded a freighter for Marseille but, finding herself to be the only women on the ship, disembarked at Naples and spent some months in Florence before returning to Paris and reopening her studio. Scott spent the summer of 1906 at Noordwijk in the Netherlands supporting a pregnant Isadora Duncan and then spent some months on an island near Methana in Greece before moving to London.

=== Marriage to Robert Falcon Scott ===
In London, Scott took a flat in Cheyne Walk and made a series of portrait busts, mostly of young men. She became acquainted with George Bernard Shaw, Max Beerbohm and J. M. Barrie, whose former home she later bought. At one point, she became seriously ill with an abdominal cyst and was thought unlikely to live. Scott recovered and subsequently assisted her upstairs neighbour, a district maternity nurse, on house calls to deliver babies.

In October 1907, she met Captain Robert Falcon Scott at a tea party having briefly seen him at a lunch hosted by Mabel Beardsley several months earlier. The two spent ten days together before he left London on Naval duties but within a month they had decided to marry. Their wedding was on 2 September 1908, in the Chapel Royal at Hampton Court Palace with Rodin among the 150 guests. The couple took a house on Buckingham Palace Road in London and in September 1909 their son Peter Scott, who became famous in painting and conservation, was born.

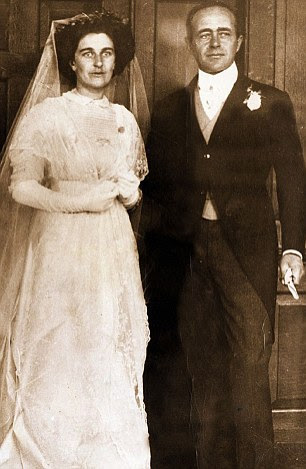
Kathleen and Robert Falcon Scott at their wedding, 1908.

In July 1910, she accompanied her husband to New Zealand to see him off on his journey to the South Pole and in October that year they spent a fortnight together at Lyttelton, on the South Island, before Captain Scott and his crew departed on 29 November. Kathleen Scott returned to England and, after extended stop-overs in Australia and Egypt, arrived at Dover in February 1911. It has been suggested that, in her husband's absence, she had a brief affair with the Norwegian explorer Fridtjof Nansen. This has been denied by others.

In London, Kathleen Scott created portrait busts and heads of various friends and relatives and also worked on a statuette of Florence Nightingale while supporting fund-raising exercises for the Antarctic expedition. She received her first commission for a public monument, a life-size statue of Charles Rolls, which was unveiled in April 1912. When Rolls's family lent Scott some of his clothing for her model, she was shocked to find they had included blood-stained items from his fatal air crash. During 1912 she also created portrait busts of, among others, the Prime Minister Herbert Asquith, Fridtjof Nansen, Compton Mackenzie plus a series of figures of bishops for the chapel at Winchester College and a sculpture of a baby for a hospital. At the end of the year she began working on a statuette of her husband.

Kathleen Scott decided to travel to New Zealand to meet her husband on his return from Antarctica. She left Liverpool on 4 January 1913 for New York, then travelled by train to New Orleans and El Paso and went camping in Mexico before sailing from California to Tahiti. The bodies of Captain Scott and his companions were discovered on the 12 November 1912 and the news reached London on 11 January 1913 with a memorial service, attended by King George V, being held at St Paul's Cathedral on 14 February 1913. Five days later a wireless message finally reached the ship Kathleen Scott was on and she was informed of her husband's death. She continued on to New Zealand where she was given the diaries and letters which had been recovered when her husband's body had been found.

On her return to London, Scott and her son were the subject of intensive public and press attention which she tried to counter by embarking on a concentrated period of work. She began work on large statues of Captain Scott, Asquith and Captain Edward Smith. In August 1913, she spent some time in Andorra and in 1914 she went to North Africa. After trekking in the Sahara, Scott returned to Britain shortly before World War I began.

=== World War I ===
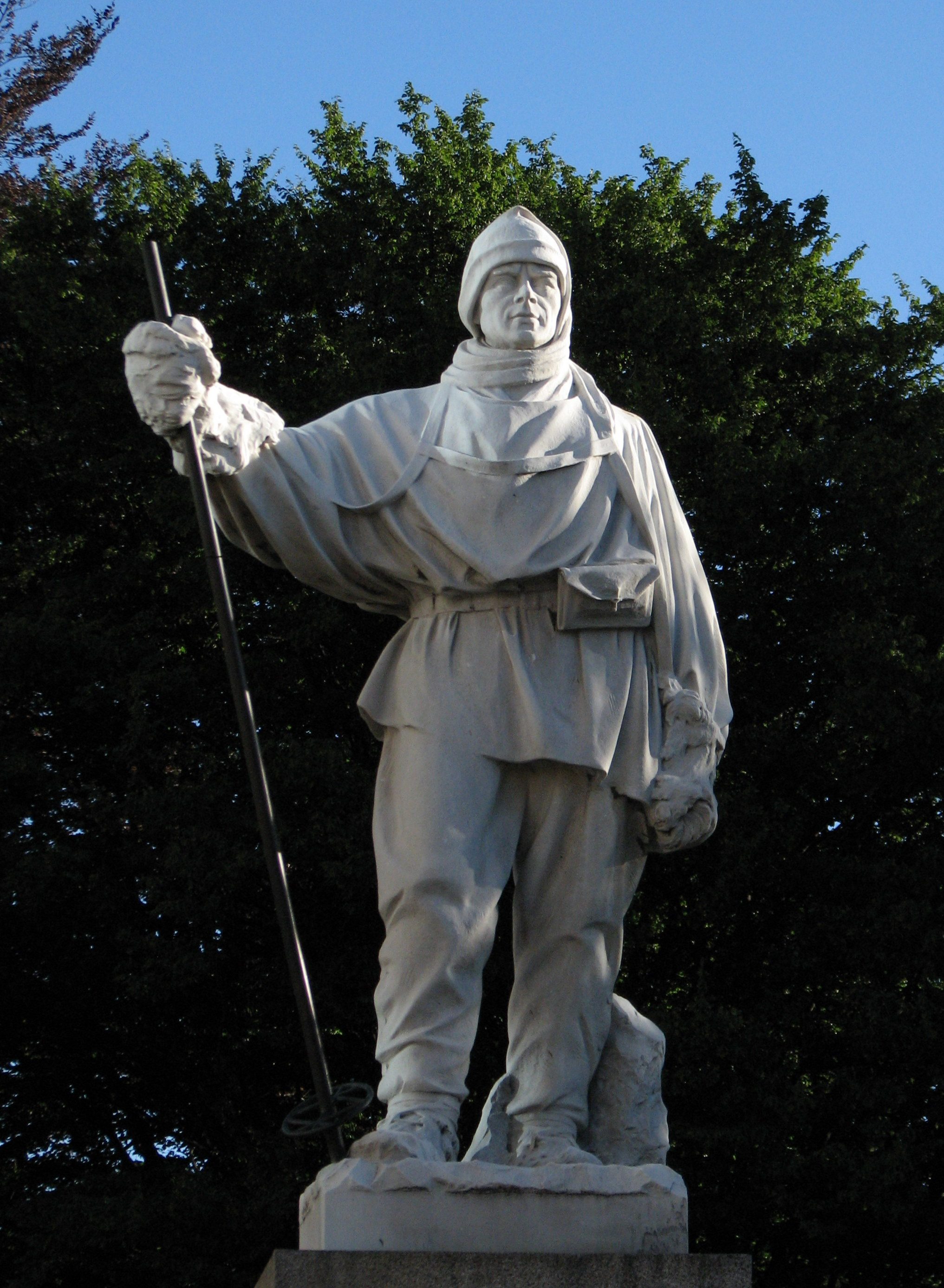
Statue of Robert Falcon Scott, Christchurch, New Zealand (photographed before it was damaged in the 2011 earthquakes)

During World War I, Scott initially set aside sculpture and worked in a variety of other roles to support the British and Allied war effort. She helped to set up an ambulance service for the French army by transporting vehicles to northern France and raised money and recruited volunteers to support the establishment of Hôpital Temporaire d'Arc-en-Barrois at the Chateau d'Arc-en-Barrois where she subsequently worked for a time. Scott then worked on the assembly benches of a Vickers electronics factory at Erith in south London. In England she also worked on three statues connected with the Terra Nova expedition. The first to be commissioned, by the mayor of Cheltenham, was her statue of Edward Wilson which was unveiled in July 1914. Her statue of Scott in his naval greatcoat with a husky at his feet was commissioned by officers of the Portsmouth naval base and dockyards and was unveiled in February 1915. Her bronze statue of Captain Scott was unveiled in central London in November 1915, although Scott did not attend the ceremony and spent the day at the Vickers factory.

In March 1916, Scott travelled, via Paris and Rome, to the quarry in Carrara, Italy, where she carved the white marble Statue of Captain Robert Falcon Scott which was erected at Christchurch Central City, New Zealand, in 1917. Later in 1916, she struck up a close friendship with the Australian geologist and polar explorer Sir Douglas Mawson, who was stationed in Sandwich, Kent, while working for the British Ministry of Munitions. Historian David Day in 2013 suggested that the pair had conducted an affair there; however, this is refuted by historian Tom Griffiths, who says that they were united in grief at the time and found solace in one another.

In 1917, Scott served as a private secretary to Sir Matthew Nathan in the Ministry of Pensions. She resigned that post towards the end of 1917 but resumed working for the Ministry in Paris for a short while. During October 1918 Scott began working at the Queen's Hospital in Sidcup, creating masks and facial models of wounded patients for the plastic surgeons there, including Harold Gillies, to use in planning reconstructive surgery.

=== 1920s ===
Scott visited Paris immediately after the war ended and worked to promote the formation of the League of Nations. She continued to receive considerable press coverage for her dignified manner as the widow of a national hero while continuing to work as a sculptor. She received numerous commissions for portraits, war memorials and regimental pieces and had three works shown at the Royal Academy in London in 1919. Throughout the inter-war years she had six significant solo exhibitions and continued to regularly show new works at the Royal Academy, with at least one piece shown there every year, except once, between 1920 and 1940. Early in 1920 she visited Italy and during 1921 undertook an extended trip to the United States, Panama, Cuba and Ecuador. During the early 1920s, along with many smaller pieces and statuettes, Scott made a large portrait bust of David Lloyd George, created the Thinking Soldier war memorial for Huntingdon and the large male nude, modelled by the 22-year-old Arnold Lawrence, which is now outside the Scott Polar Research Institute in Cambridge.

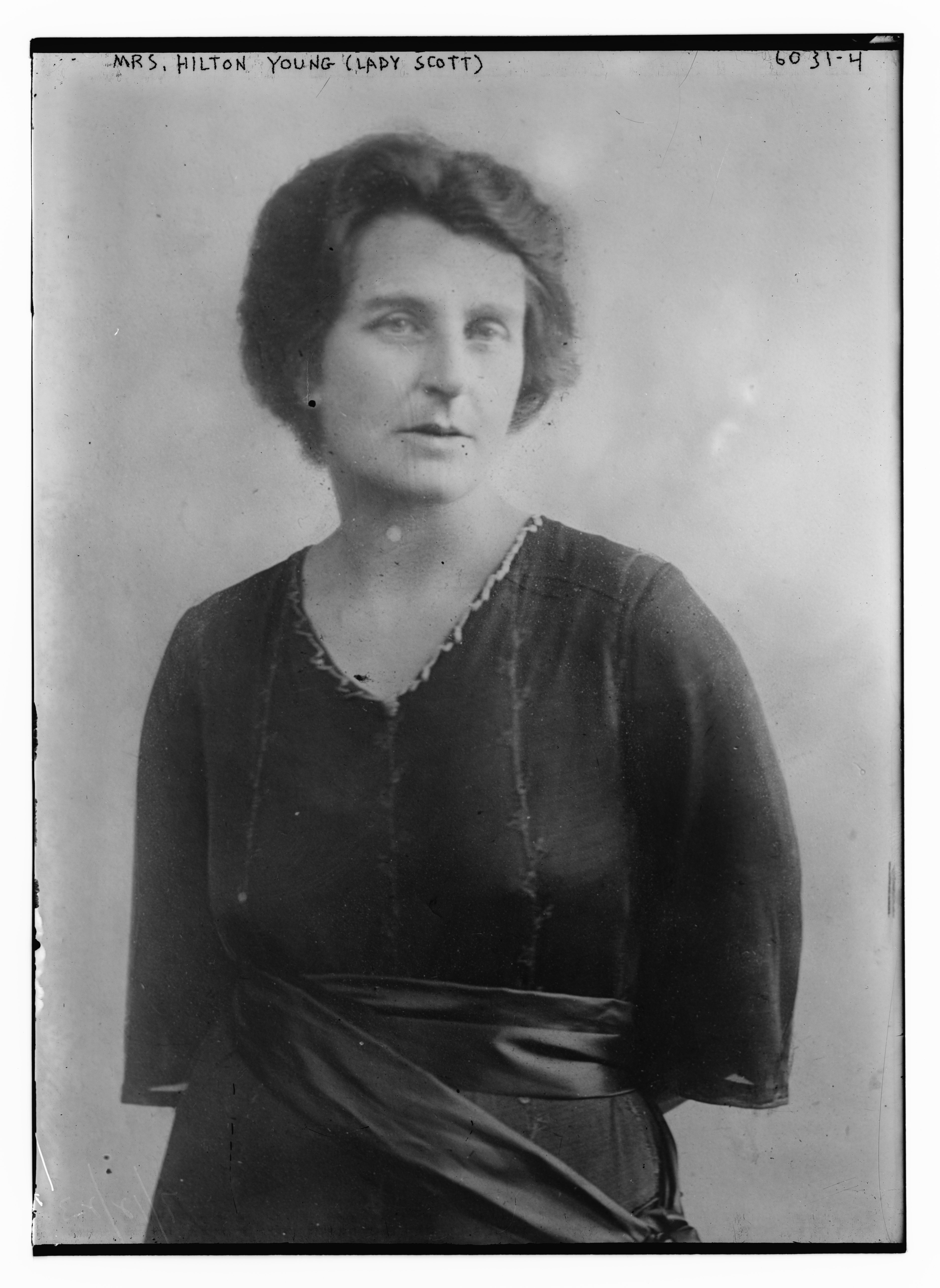
Kathleen Scott, 1923

The Lawrence statue was one of several idealised sculptures of young male nudes that Scott created throughout her career. The Lawrence figure was originally designed by Scott as a war memorial and was exhibited several times at major exhibitions in London and Paris under different titles, such as Youth and These had most to give. Although it won a medal at the 1925 Paris Salon the work failed to sell and Scott donated it to the Scott Polar Research Institute in Cambridge. Despite initial opposition from the Institute's board of management, the statue now known as May Eternal Light Shine Upon Them, was erected on the forecourt of the Institute's new building in 1934 where it serves as a memorial to the 1911–1912 Antarctic Expedition.

In November 1919, Scott met Edward Hilton Young, an M.P. with a distinguished war record. They married in March 1922 with the ceremony taking place in the St Mary Undercroft crypt of the Palace of Westminster. Later the same year the couple attended the Hague conference on trade with Russia together. Her second son, Wayland Hilton Young, who became a writer and politician, was born the following year. Marriage to a politician suited Scott who had long counted several leading statesmen, most notably Asquith but also Lloyd George, Austen Chamberlain and Stanley Baldwin, among her social circle. Asquith, even when Prime Minister, frequently visited Scott's studio and regularly wrote to her. Her bust of Asquith is in the Tate collection in London.

From 1927, Scott and her family lived at Leinster Corner near Lancaster Gate in central London, overlooking Kensington Gardens, in a house once owned by J. M. Barrie. The property had a coach-house, which she converted into a two-storey high studio, and a large garden where she worked on monumental pieces in the open air. These included a larger than life-size bronze statue of Thomas Cholmondeley, 4th Baron Delamere, on a ten-foot base, costing £2,000, for Nairobi, Kenya.

=== Later life ===
Scott's 1929 solo exhibition at the Greatorex Gallery in central London received favourable press reviews and included portrait sculptures of, among others, John Reith, 1st Baron Reith, John Simon, 1st Viscount Simon and Anthony Bernard. Throughout the 1930s, despite bouts of ill health, Scott continued to work and travel. She visited Italy in 1930 and 1936, attended the Paris Salon in 1932 and, most years spent some weeks in Switzerland with her sons. She created a plaque depicting Queen Mary for the ocean liner of the same name, made busts of George V and Neville Chamberlain, a memorial for Poets' Corner and a statue of the actor Sabu.

Scott's work was in great demand in the years preceding the Second World War. Between 1935 and 1940 she produced a monumental nude figure originally entitled The Strength Within and later England, plus busts of Montague Norman, George Bernard Shaw and the Prince of Wales, before he became King Edward VIII. She was the subject of BBC Television's first programme on sculpture in 1937 and the following year an illustrated volume, Homage. A Book of Sculptures was published with text by Stephen Gwynn. At the start of World War II, Scott volunteered to work with plastic surgeons as she had done in World War I but was not called upon although she did host a number of evacuee children at her country cottage in Norfolk near Fritton Lake for a short time.

Throughout her life, Scott remained a traditional sculptor and worked independently of contemporary artistic developments such as modernism and abstraction. Described by the Oxford Dictionary of National Biography as "the most significant and prolific British women sculptor before Barbara Hepworth", her traditional style of sculpture and her hostility to the abstract work of, for example Henry Moore and Jacob Epstein, coupled with the media emphasis on her being Captain Scott's widow, has led to a lack of recognition for her artistic career.

Scott died, from leukaemia, at St Mary's Hospital, Paddington, near to her Lancaster Gate home, in July 1947. Her funeral service was held at West Overton in Wiltshire, where a commemorative plaque is sited. A memorial exhibition of her work was held at the Mansard Gallery in 1947 and two years later her autobiography, Self Portrait of An Artist was published. Scott's grandchildren include the artist Emily Young and the writer Louisa Young, her biographer.

== Awards and memberships ==
- 1915: Member of the International Society of Sculptors, Painters and Gravers.
- 1925: Medal winner, Paris Salon
- 1925: Associate member of the Societe des Artistes Francais
- 1928: Associate member of the Royal Society of British Sculptors
- 1946: Fellow of the Royal Society of British Sculptors

== Titles ==
In 1913, Scott was granted the rank (but not the style) of a widow of a Knight Commander of the Order of the Bath. This meant that, for the purposes of establishing official precedence, she was treated as if she were the widow of such a knight. However, she was not entitled to be called Lady Scott merely by virtue of this (although she often was), and it did not amount to Captain Scott being posthumously knighted. Despite this, in 1914 a Sydney Harbour ferry was christened Lady Scott in her honour. When her second husband was created Baron Kennet on 15 July 1935, she gained the title Baroness Kennet.

== In popular culture ==
Scott was played by the actress Diana Churchill in the 1948 Ealing Studios film Scott of the Antarctic, with John Mills as her husband. In 1983, she was played by Athene Fielding in the BBC miniseries Shackleton, with Neil Stacy as her husband. In 1985, she was played by Susan Wooldridge in the television miniseries The Last Place on Earth, from Central Independent Television, with Martin Shaw as her husband. A BBC Radio play, Imitations by Michael Butt, was based on the friendship between Scott and George Bernard Shaw, who frequently sat for her.

== Selected public works ==
Image	Title / subject	Location and coordinates	Date	Type	Material	Dimensions	Designation	Wikidata	Notes
More images	Charles Rolls	Marine Parade, Dover	1911	Statue on pedestal	Bronze and stone			Q117378416	
More images	Captain Edward Smith	Beacon Park, Lichfield	1914	Statue on pedestal with plaque	Bronze and Cornish granite		Grade II	Q26482574	
More images	Edward Wilson	The Promenade, Cheltenham	1914	Statue on pedestal	Bronze and stone		Grade II	Q26667370	
More images	Robert Falcon Scott	College Road, Portsmouth Historic Dockyard	1915	Statue on pedestal with plaque	Bronze and granite		Grade II	Q26562141	
More images	Robert Falcon Scott	Waterloo Place, London	1915	Statue on pedestal with plaque	Bronze and granite	Statue 3m; pedestal 3.4m	Grade II	Q27084830	
More images	Statue of Robert Falcon Scott	Christchurch, New Zealand	1917	Statue on pedestal and steps	Marble and stone		Category II	Q7437304	
	David Lloyd George	Lloyd George Museum, Llanystumdwy	1921	Bust on pillar	Bronze				
More images	May Eternal Light Shine Upon Them	Scott Polar Research Institute, Cambridge	1922	Statue on pedestal	Bronze and stone			Q116880402	
More images	The Thinking Soldier war memorial	Market Square, Huntingdon	1923	Statue on pedestal	Bronze and stone		Grade II	Q26676626	
More images	John Reith, 1st Baron Reith	Broadcasting House, London	1929	Bust	Bronze			Q108308624	
More images	Alfred Harmsworth, 1st Viscount Northcliffe	St Dunstan-in-the-West, Fleet Street, London	1930	Bust on pedestal	Bronze and stone		Grade I	Q30316413	Architect, Edwin Lutyens
More images	Robert Falcon Scott	Scott Polar Institute, Cambridge	1934	Bust in circular niche	Bronze		Grade II	Q2747894	
More images	Adam Lindsay Gordon	Poets' Corner, Westminster Abbey, London	1934	Bust	Stone			Q98596701	
	Ad Astra	The Campus, Welwyn Garden City	c. 1940	Statue on pedestal	Bronze and brickwork				

=== Other works ===
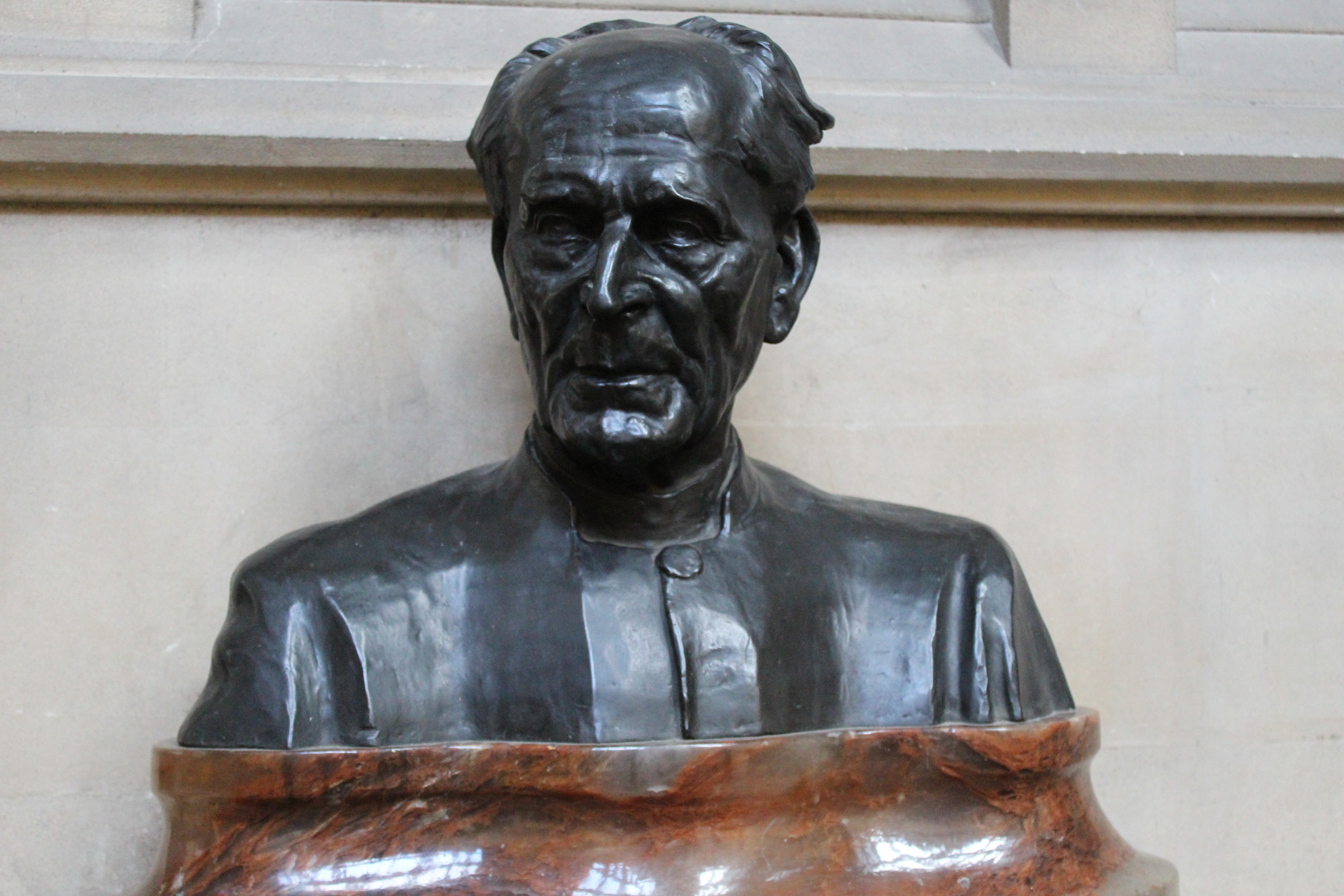
Bust of George Forrest Browne, Bristol Cathedral

- A small bronze of the Indian actor Sabu which is now missing, after a theft.
- Bust of George Forrest Browne in Bristol Cathedral
- A larger than life-size statue of Thomas Cholmondeley, 4th Baron Delamere. It was initially situated in Nairobi, Kenya, but is now in the Soysambu Conservancy, near Nakuru, Kenya.
- Here am I, send me, a bronze figure of a nude boy raising his arm as if volunteering. Following World War I, Scott made two casts of the figure as war memorials, one for West Downs School and one for Oundle School which were her son Peter's schools. When West Downs closed, the memorial was relocated to WWT Slimbridge, the nature reserve he had established.
- A memorial plaque to Captain J. M. T. Richie at the church of St Peter & St Paul at Medmenham in Buckinghamshire.
- A large standing statue, c. 1928, with arms folded and head bowed, of Edwin Montagu, former Secretary of State for India. Originally erected in Calcutta in 1931, the statue was subsequently relocated to the grounds of Flagstaff House, Barrackpore.
- The Royal Collection holds Scott's 1935 bust of King George V while the National Maritime Museum at Greenwich in London has her head and shoulders figure of George VI.
- Bronze bust of Robert Falcon Scott, commissioned by the Devonport Corporation c. 1913-14, and displayed at the Stoke Damerel Community College in Plymouth.
- Three works by Scott are in the collection of London's National Portrait Gallery, and she is also the subject of several photographic portraits there.
