= Annetta Alexandridis =

German archaeologist and art historian (1968–2026)

Annetta Alexandridis (1 April 1968 – 13 April 2026) was a German classical archaeologist and art historian at Cornell University, New York. Her research focused on the art of ancient Greece and Rome with a particular interest in gender studies, animal studies, and the media of archaeology.

== Early life and education ==
Alexandridis was born in Frankfurt on 1 April 1968. She received her PhD from LMU Munich in 2002. Her doctoral thesis was Von Livia bis Iulia Domna: die Frauen des römischen Kaiserhauses in statuarischer, epigraphischer und numismatischer Überlieferung. Her dissertation received the dissertation prize (Förderpreis) of the LMU Munich University Association and she was awarded the travel scholarship of the German Archaeological Institute 1997–1998). Before completing her PhD, Alexandridis studied French language and music at the Sorbonne (1986–1987) and then concentrated on classical archaeology, ancient history and art history at the Ecole du Louvre in Paris and the University of Perugia.

== Career and research ==
Alexandridis began her career at the University of Rostock before working at the Collection of Classical Antiquities, Antikensammlung of the Pergamonmuseum Berlin (Pergamon Museum). She joined the Department of the History of Art at the Cornell University College of Arts and Sciences in 2006. She was the associate director of the ongoing excavations at the ancient city of Sardis, Turkey, where she studied Roman funerary culture and was surveying Sardis's cemeteries.

She co-edited the book Destroy the Copy – Plaster Cast Collections in the 19th-20th Centuries in 2023. In 2004, she wrote the book Die Frauen des Römischen Kaiserhauses, which explored how women in Roman Imperial families were represented in public. Together with Verity Platt, Alexandridis co-curated Cornell’s plaster cast collection.

Alexandridis was a fellow at the Cornell Society for the Humanities (2015–2016) and a junior fellow at Harvard University’s Center for Hellenic Studies (2005–2006).

== Death ==
Alexandridis died in New York City on 13 April 2026, at the age of 58.

== Bibliography ==
- Die Frauen des römischen Kaiserhauses. Eine Untersuchung ihrer bildlichen Darstellung von Livia bis Iulia Domna (Mainz: von Zabern, 2004)
- Archäologie der Photographie. Bilder aus der Photothek der Berliner Antikensammlung (with Wolf-Dieter Heilmeyer) (Mainz: von Zabern, 2004)
- Mensch und Tier in der Antike: Grenzziehung und Grenzüberschreitung (with Markus Wild and Lorenz Winkler-Horaček) (Wiesbaden: Reichert Verlag, 2008)
- “Portraiture of Flavian Imperial Women,” in: Elizabeth Carney and Sabine Müller (eds.), The Routledge Companion to Women and Monarchy in the Ancient Mediterranean World (London – New York: Routledge 2021) 423–438
- Destroy the Copy – Plaster Cast Collections in the 19th and 20th Centuries. Demolition, Defacement, Disposal in Europe and Beyond (with Lorenz Winkler-Horaček) (Berlin, New York: De Gruyter, 2022)
