= Statue of Robert Falcon Scott, Christchurch =

Statue in Christchurch, New Zealand

Statue of Robert Falcon Scott
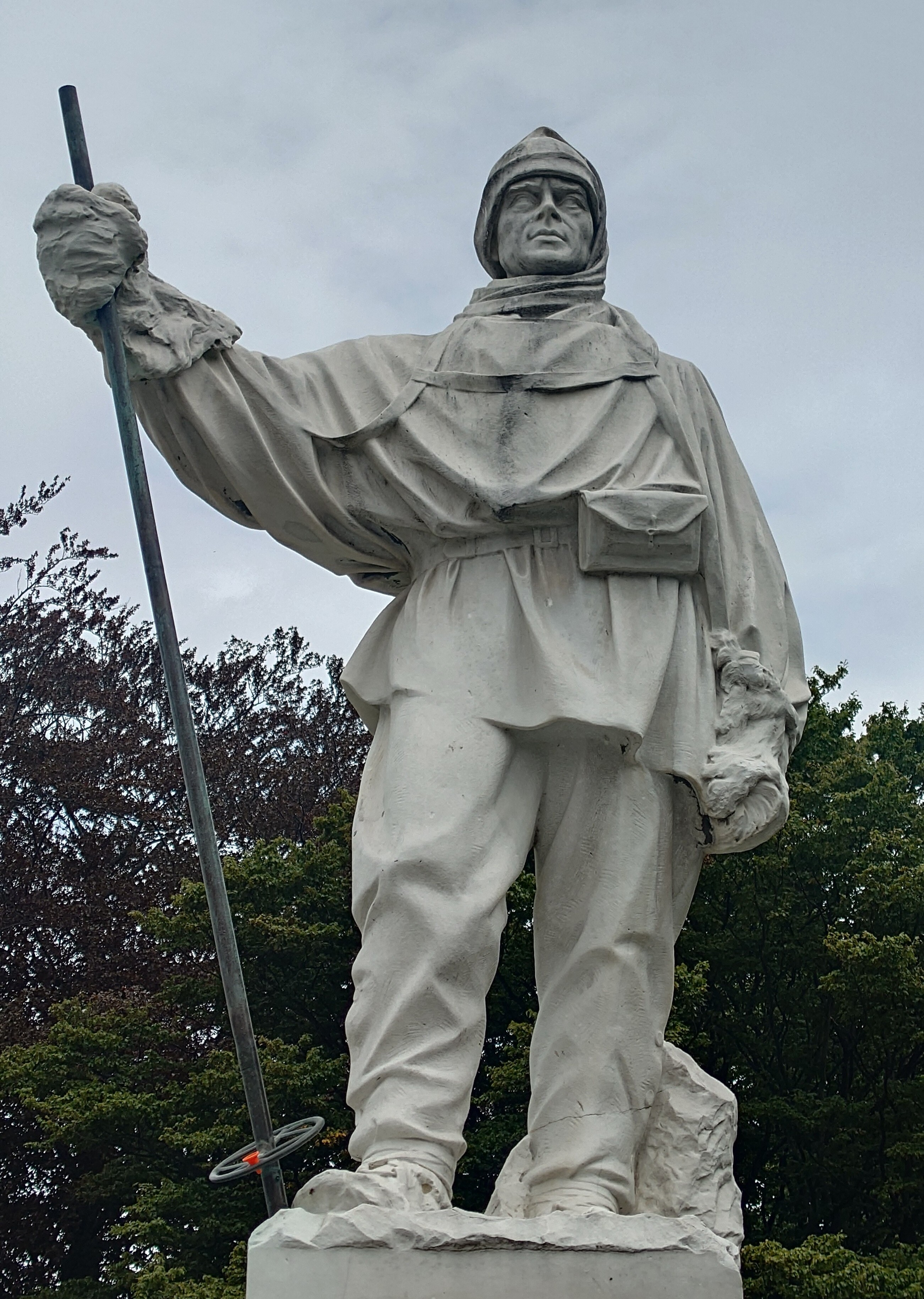
- Scott Statue in Christchurch, New Zealand, sculpted by his widow, Kathleen Scott.
- Interactive map of Statue of Robert Falcon Scott
- Location: Christchurch Central City, New Zealand
- Coordinates: 43.53120°S 172.63361°E
- Designer: Kathleen Scott
- Material: Marble (statue); Granite (plinth)
- Height: 2.6 m (8 ft 6 in)
- Weight: 2.5 t (2.8 tons)
- Opening date: 9 February 1917
- Restored date: 26 October 2017

Heritage New Zealand – Category 2
- Designated: 26 November 1981
- Reference no.: 1840

The Statue of Robert Falcon Scott, commonly known as the Scott Statue, is a statue in Christchurch, New Zealand commemorating British Antarctic explorer Robert Falcon Scott. The statue was unveiled in 1917 and is located at a small recreational park at the intersection of Worcester Street and Oxford Terrace in Christchurch Central City. Scott likely died on 29 March 1912 during his Terra Nova Expedition to the South Pole. His death became public knowledge on 10 February 1913, in response, locals organised a committee dedicated to Scott within one week of the news of his death. The statue was commissioned to be carved by Scott's widow, Kathleen Scott, in which she travelled to a marble quarry in Carrara, Italy to carve it in March 1916. Her work was shipped to New Zealand in late 1916 and was unveiled on 9 February 1917. The statue is one of few monuments recognising the significance of early 20th-century Antarctic exploration.

The statue toppled off its plinth in the February 2011 Christchurch earthquake and broke in two; it was temporarily on display in an exhibition in the Canterbury Museum and was later reinstated in its original location on 26 October 2017; unveiled a second time, by the descendants of Scott and Lianne Dalziel, former Mayor of Christchurch. The statue reflects Christchurch's connection with Antarctica and the British Empire and is also recognised by Heritage New Zealand as a Category II historic place.

== Background ==
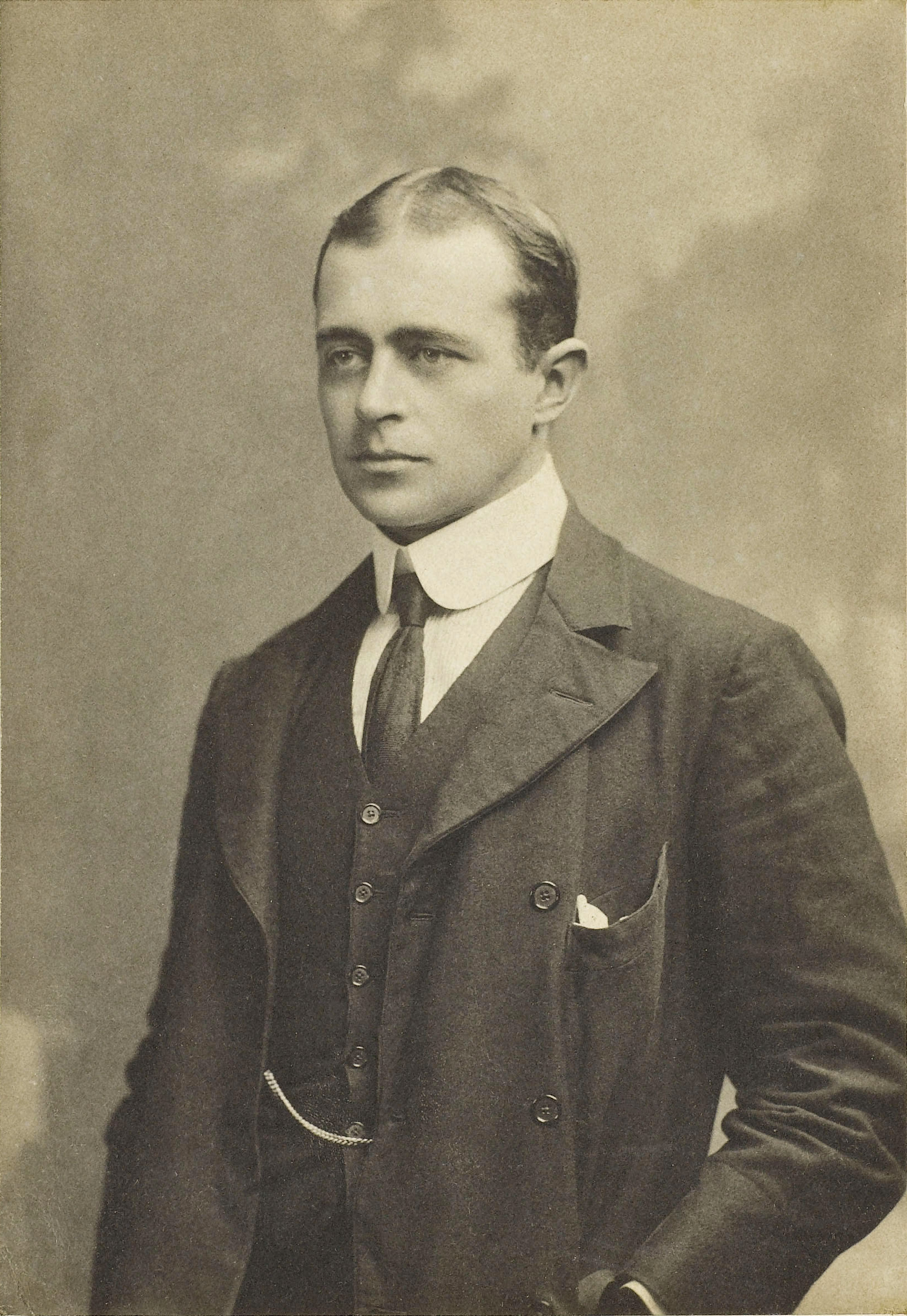
Portrait of Scott by John Thomson, c. 1900.

The British Antarctic explorer Robert Falcon Scott had used Christchurch and Lyttelton as his New Zealand base for the Discovery Expedition of 1901–1904 and Terra Nova Expedition of 1910–1913. In between, Ernest Shackleton's Nimrod Expedition of 1907–1909 also used Lyttelton as the base for their attempt to reach the South Pole, but they failed to get there. Scott and his companions had a strong connection with the people of the Canterbury Region, the Terra Nova departed from England on 1 June 1910 and arrived to Lyttelton Harbour / Whakaraupō on 28 October and were cherished by locals as they arrived. Scott and his companions were welcomed by locals and conducted research and analyses at the Canterbury Museum and tested their equipment at a meteorological hut in the Christchurch Botanic Gardens. Locals also helped supply their expeditions and gathered on 28 November 1910 to bade farewell to the explorers before preceding to Port Chalmers to make their final stop before continuing to Antarctica. The objective of the Terra Nova Expedition was to be the first to reach the geographical South Pole. Scott and his four other companions eventually reached the pole on 17 January 1912, to learn that a Norwegian team led by Roald Amundsen had preceded them by 34 days.

Scott and his companions struggled during their expedition and faced inclement weather and shortages of resources. Nearing the end of their journey from the pole, Scott and his two final companions set up their tent for the final time on 19 March. Henry Robertson Bowers and Edward Wilson planned to walk to the final depot, which was 11 mi (18 km) away, but never left their tent because Scott was unable to walk. Their deaths were certain because of the limited resources and enough food for only two days. Captain Scott likely died on 29 March, and was presumably the last to die of the expedition.

A search party consisting of the crew of the Terra Nova departed their camp in late October in hopes of sighting Scott and his companions that were missing for several months. On 12 November, the search party found a tent that contained the deteriorating bodies of Bowers, Wilson, and Scott. Tryggve Gran, of the search party, placed a memorial cross at the site of their deaths. The Terra Nova left for home in January 1913 and arrived to a port in Oamaru in the early morning on 10 February. Edward L. Atkinson and Harry Pennell of the expedition rowed to the port, from where they sent a coded message back to the expedition's organiser. On 12 February, the ship arrived to Lyttelton Harbour / Whakaraupō, where the men of the expedition were surprised to see the city in mourning and flags flying at half-mast. Scott and his companions' deaths resulted in them being treated as heroes throughout the British Empire.

== Description ==
The Statue of Robert Falcon Scott is located on the corner of Worcester Street and Oxford Terrace in Christchurch Central City, New Zealand. It is located in a small recreational park known as the Scott Statue Reserve beside the Avon River / Ōtākaro. The statue is a 2.6-metre (8-foot-6-inch) hand-carved white marble sculpture depicting Captain Scott in a Polar dress. He holds a bronze alpenstock in his right hand, facing north towards the Old Municipal Chambers building, on top of a concrete foundation, and a stone plinth made of several granite pieces that had been mortared together. The statue weighs about 2.5 tonnes (2.5 long tons; 2.8 short tons). The statue is also commonly known as the Captain Scott Memorial, Robert Falcon Scott Memorial, or simply the Scott Statue.

In 1917, The Press, a Christchurch-based newspaper publication, described the statue as "Fortunate in many things – in the beauty of its surroundings, in its fine open spaces, in the wise provision of its founders manifested in other ways – Christchurch is not least fortunately endowed in its statues of public men".

== History ==
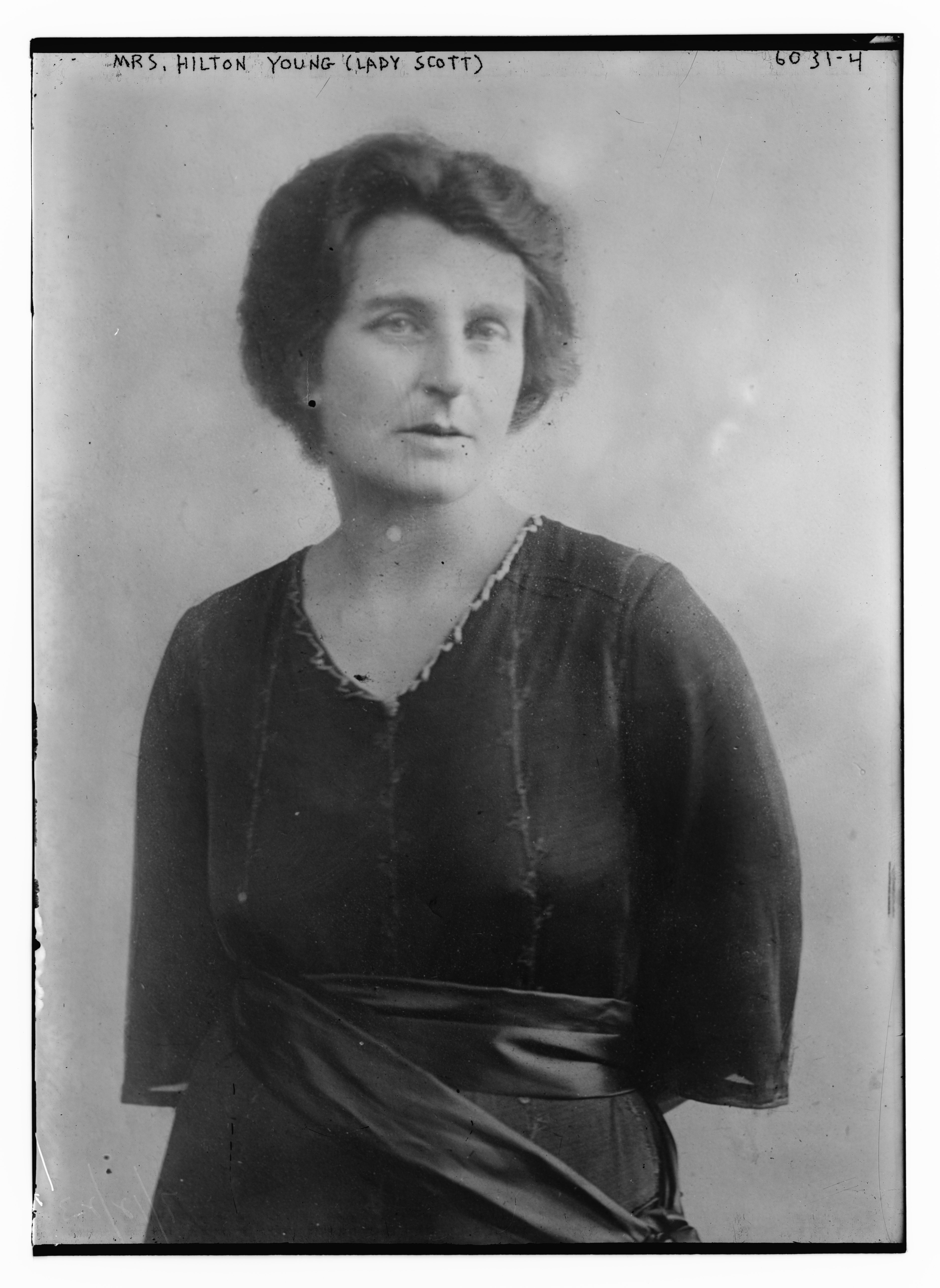
An image of Kathleen Scott (c. 1900). Captain Scott's widow and sculptor of the statue.

After the news of the deaths of Scott and his companions reached Christchurch, many locals suggested that a memorial to Scott and the other explorers to be erected in Christchurch. The Mayor of Christchurch, Henry Holland, called for a public meeting to organise a memorial fund within one week of the news of their deaths. A committee dedicated to Scott, named the Scott Memorial Committee, was established and over £1,000 was raised over a number of months from public donations for the memorial from schools and other local organisations that contributed towards a memorial to be erected in Canterbury, because of Christchurch's close connection with the expedition.

Whilst the form of the memorial or its location had not been decided upon, the committee wrote to Captain Scott's widow, Kathleen Scott and enquired about her thoughts about the proposal. The first proposal for a memorial of Captain Scott was put forward by a local bishop who suggested "that some great monument, placed right on the summit of the Port Hills, would be very suitable and it would be visible from both Lyttelton, with all its shipping, and from Christchurch and the plains". Though this proposal was never finalised. The Christchurch City Council and the committee later commissioned Kathleen to create a replica of the bronze statue in Waterloo Place in London, England that was erected in 1915. The statue in Christchurch was originally meant to be made with bronze, but the rising costs of the material caused by World War I made marble a more cost-effective option.

In February 1916, the committee decided the statue would be positioned on a grass plot beside the Avon River / Ōtākaro and opposite the Clarendon Hotel facing the Old Municipal Council building. Kathleen travelled to carve the statue in a marble quarry in Carrara, Italy, in March 1916.

Kathleen Scott's work was completed in May 1916, and the statue was shipped to New Zealand later that same year. A large crowd gathered at the intersection of Worcester Street and Oxford Terrace on 9 February 1917 to witness the unveiling of the memorial with several speakers who reflected on the explorers' scientific contributions. The statue was unveiled by the Governor of New Zealand, The Earl of Liverpool who stated "Captain Scott represented everything best in the traditions of the British Navy, and were he alive today". Mayor Henry Holland stated that "the memorial to Captain Scott would remain a permanent reminder to the generations of the future that the Englishmen of these days were worthy upholders of the noblest traditions of their race". Speakers also noting that the statue would "act as an inspiration and an incentive to succeeding generations to emulate their example".

=== Inscriptions ===
There is an inscription on the plinth, which includes the names of his party of five which died and one of Scott's last diary entries. The inscription reads:

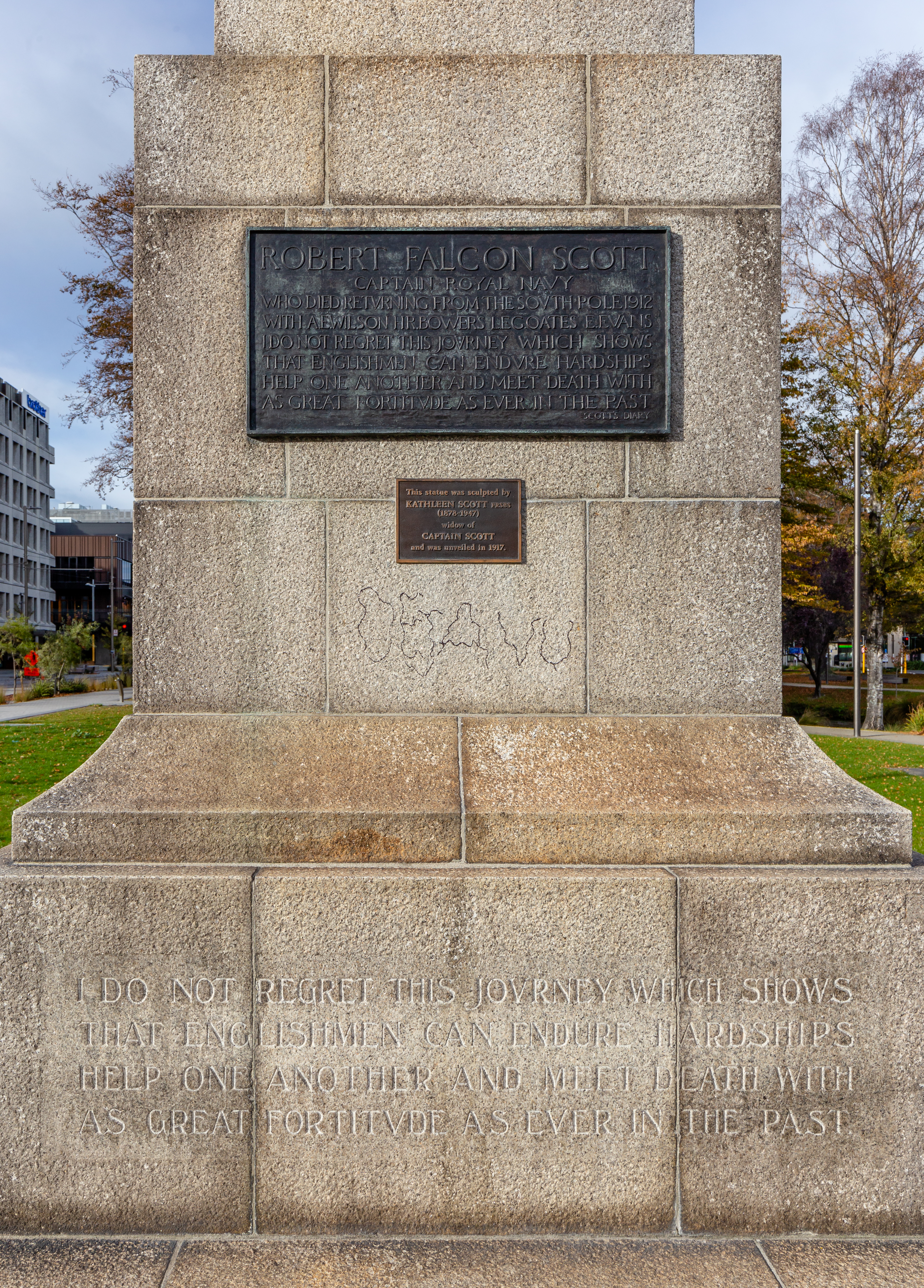
Base of the statue with its plaques, commemorating Captain Scott and the sculptor, Kathleen Scott.

ROBERT FALCON SCOTT
CAPTAIN ROYAL NAVY
Who died returning from the South Pole, 1912, with A. E. Wilson, H. R. Bowers, L. E. G. Oates, E. Evans.

I do not regret this journey, which shows
that Englishmen can endure hardships,
help one another, and meet death with
as great fortitude as ever in the past.

A further inscription below the one commemorating Captain Scott, is an inscription recognising the statue's sculptor, Kathleen Scott, that reads:

This statue was sculpted by
KATHLEEN SCOTT FRBS
(1878–1947)
widow of
CAPTAIN SCOTT
and was unveiled in 1917.

=== Earthquake of February 2011 ===
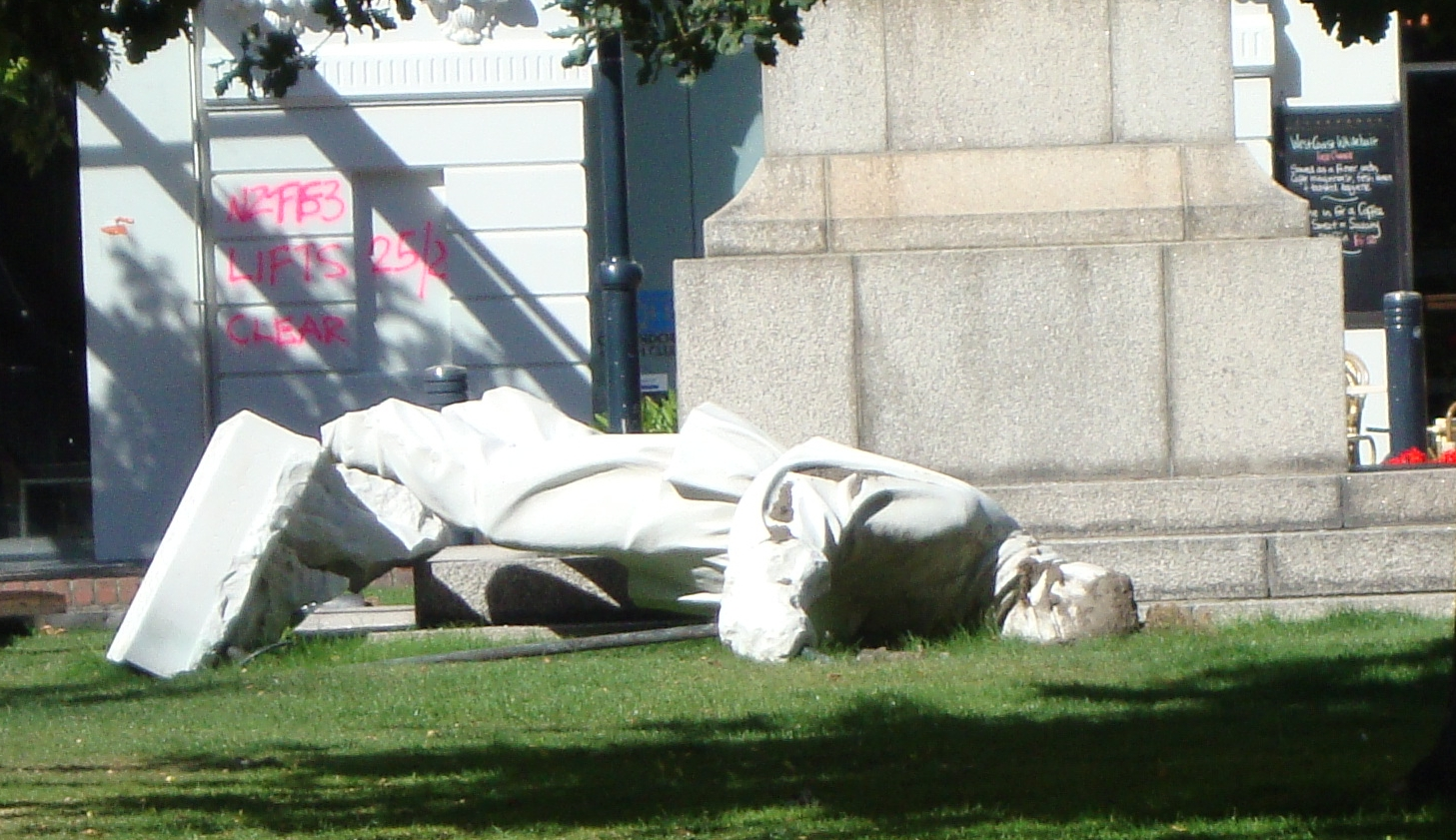
Statue fallen off its plinth during the 2011 Christchurch earthquake.

The statue was toppled off its plinth by the February 2011 Christchurch earthquake. Unattached to the plinth, the statue fell to the base, with its head buried in the ground and it broken below its knees. Some more damage was caused by people trying to "dig out" around the head. The statue was lifted on 4 April 2011, from its location inside the Central City Red Zone, which suffered significant damage during the earthquake. The statue was later craned onto two wooden plinths and transported to a storage facility. Over the next few years, the statue was on display during the November 2012 Icefest in Hagley Park, and from January 2016, in Christchurch's Earthquake Museum, which is part of the Canterbury Museum, in City Mall.

=== Restoration ===
During the restoration of the statue, four carbon fibre rods were inserted from foot to waist in each leg, strengthening the rebuilt statue. In order to attach the statue to its plinth, a stonemason drilled a hole through the granite top and the marble base, which allowed the statue to be lifted by a crane. The statue was then transported to its plinth, and its base was reinforced for earthquake resistance with a "large spring mechanism" for additional stability. The estimated cost of restoration work was $560,000, but $900,000 was insured. Restoration of the statue was completed 2017; and was unveiled a second time in a ceremony in its original location on 6 October. It was unveiled by the descendants of Scott and Lianne Dalziel, former Mayor of Christchurch. Shortly after the restoration, the statue was vandalised by someone snapping off his alpenstock in his right hand. A staff member from the Christchurch City Council later found the broken alpenstock in a nearby garden.

== Significance ==
A 2017 "significance assessment" by the Christchurch City Council reported the Scott Statue is one of few monuments recognising the importance of early 20th-century Antarctic exploration. For many people in Christchurch, the statue still serves as a symbolic portrayal of bravery, heroism, and endurance. It also reflects Christchurch's connection with Antarctic exploration and the British Empire. On 26 November 1981, the statue was recognised by Heritage New Zealand Pouhere Taonga as a Category II historic place.

== See also ==
- List of historic places in Christchurch
