= Lamponeia =

Ancient city in Turkey

Coordinates: 39°32′09″N 26°24′32″E

Lamponeia (Ancient Greek: Λαμπώνεια) or Lamponia (Λαμπωνία), also known as Lamponium or Lamponion (Λαμπώνιον), was an Aeolian city on the southern coast of the Troad region of Anatolia. Its archaeological remains have been located above the village of Kozlu in the district of Ayvacık in Çanakkale Province in Turkey. The site was first visited by Platon de Tchiatcheff in 1849, and later surveyed and identified as Lamponeia by Joseph Thacher Clarke, the excavator of nearby Assos, in 1882, and by Walther Judeich in 1896.

== History ==
Lamponeia is located at an altitude of 565 m on the long crest of a mountain which runs SW-NE for a length of 3 km in parallel with a narrow valley to the north which connected Assos to the cities of the middle Skamander valley. To the south it overlooks all sea traffic along the southern coast of the Troad. The settlement itself is 800 m in length and is protected by a 7 m thick circuit wall of rough masonry and boulders which dates to the 6th century BCE. Its strategic location controlling traffic to and from Assos to the west perhaps explains why it was captured by the Persian commander Otanes in 512 BCE.

Strabo, drawing on the mid-5th century BCE historian Hellanicus of Lesbos, considered Lamponeia to be an Aeolian Greek settlement in origin and a secondary foundation of Assos. In the 5th century BCE the city was a member of the Delian League and paid Athens a modest tribute of 1,000 drachmas (on one occasion in 430//29 1,400 drachmas) as part of the Hellespontine district. In the late 5th and early 4th century BCE the city minted bronze coinage, but thereafter disappears from the historical record. It is possible that soon after the city was incorporated into Assos and the site above Kozlu abandoned. Late Roman and middle Byzantine period finds suggest that the site was reoccupied in this period, perhaps as a defensive measure against piracy and brigandage.

== Bibliography ==
- J. M. Cook, The Troad: An Archaeological and Topographical Study (Oxford, 1973) 261–4.
- S. Mitchell, 'Lamponeia' in M. H. Hansen and T. H. Nielsen (eds), An Inventory of Archaic and Classical Poleis (Oxford, 2004) no. 783.
