= A. W. Lawrence =

British classical archaeologist (1900–1991)

Arnold Walter Lawrence FBA
- A. W. Lawrence in Omnibus (BBC, 1985)
- Born: 2 May 1900; Oxford
- Died: 31 March 1991 (aged 90); Devizes, Wiltshire
- Known for: Modelling for Youth by Kathleen Scott
- Spouse: Barbara Inness Thompson (m. 1925; died 1986) 1 child
- Father: Sir Thomas Chapman, 7th Baronet
- Family: T. E. Lawrence (brother)

Academic background
- Education: City of Oxford High School for Boys; New College, Oxford

Arnold Walter Lawrence FBA (2 May 1900 – 31 March 1991) was a British authority on classical sculpture and architecture. He was Laurence Professor of Classical Archaeology at Cambridge University in the 1940s, and in the early 1950s in Accra he founded what later became the Ghana Museums and Monuments Board as well as the National Museum of Ghana. He was the youngest brother of T. E. Lawrence ("Lawrence of Arabia"), and acted as his literary executor.

== Early life ==
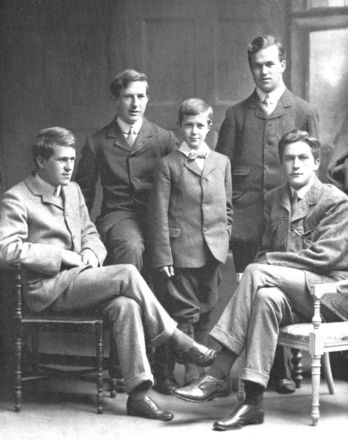
The Lawrence brothers in 1910 – Thomas (left), Frank, Arnold (centre), Bob and Will

Arnold Lawrence was born at 2 Polstead Road, Oxford, on 2 May 1900, the youngest of five sons born to Thomas Chapman (who became, in 1914, Sir Thomas Chapman, 7th Baronet), an Anglo-Irish landowner from County Westmeath, and Sarah Junner (1861–1959). The couple were unmarried but took the names "Thomas Robert Lawrence" and "Sarah Lawrence". Their second son was T. E. Lawrence who later found fame as "Lawrence of Arabia". He and Arnold Lawrence were close.

The Lawrence children were brought up in Oxford by their mother who was very religious. But Arnold Lawrence expressed outspoken anti-religious views; he once stated "All religion is vermin". He attended the City of Oxford High School for Boys before joining New College, Oxford, obtaining a diploma in Classical Archaeology in 1920 and graduating with a third in Literae Humaniores in 1921. Classical archaeology was his second choice; the young A. W. Lawrence had wanted to specialise in South-American archaeology, but no British university offered a course.

Arnold Lawrence was a student at the British School at Rome in 1921 and then at the British School at Athens until 1926. In 1923, Lawrence worked on the excavation of Ur which was directed by Leonard Woolley, under whom T. E. Lawrence had excavated at Carchemish before the First World War. In 1925 Lawrence married Barbara Inness Thompson (1902–1986), with whom he had one child, Jane Helen Thera Lawrence (1926–1978).

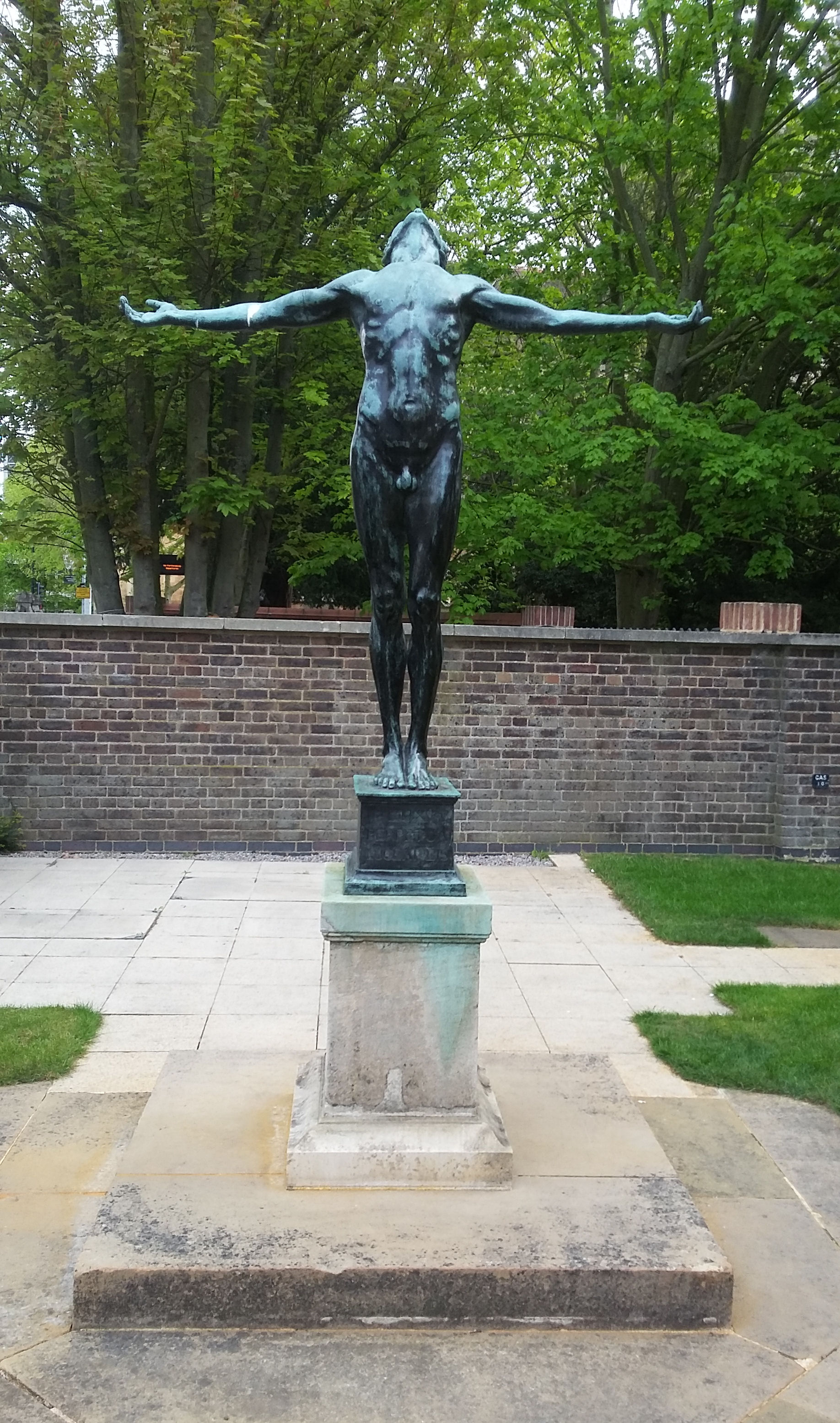
A. W. Lawrence was the model for Youth (1922–1923) by Kathleen Scott

Lawrence modelled for the sculptor Kathleen Scott in December 1922. The statue of Youth was later erected at the Scott Polar Research Institute in Cambridge.

After T. E. Lawrence's death in 1935, A. W. Lawrence promoted his older brother's memory, collecting material connected to him, and attempting to correct misrepresentations of his character in the media. In 1936, A. W. Lawrence gave Clouds Hill to the National Trust; it is now a museum. T. E.'s enduring fame was a burden for A. W.; from his early twenties until the day he died, many people saw A. W. Lawrence primarily as the brother of someone else.

== Academic career ==
=== England ===
He wrote widely on the subject of Greek architecture and sculpture as well as on European coastal fortifications in west Africa. In 1930 he was elected to the Laurence readership in Classical Archaeology at the University of Cambridge. In 1944 he succeeded Alan Wace as Laurence Professor of Classical Archaeology at Cambridge and was elected to a Fellowship at Jesus College, Cambridge.

=== Ghana ===
In 1951 he obtained a Leverhulme Research Fellowship for the study of ancient fortifications, a subject inherited from T. E. Lawrence. In 1951 he resigned from his post at Cambridge to become the Professor of Archaeology at the University College of the Gold Coast where he established the National Museum and was the Secretary and Conservator of the Monuments and Relics Committee. He resigned from these posts in 1957 after Ghana became independent and soon after settled at Pateley Bridge in Yorkshire, later moving to Bouthwaite.

=== Retirement ===
In the summer of 1985 Lawrence was interviewed by Julia Cave for a BBC Omnibus programme about T. E. Lawrence.

In September 1985, when he and his wife could no longer drive, they moved to Langford, near Biggleswade, close to where their two grandchildren were living. Following his wife's death in November 1986, Lawrence moved to the house of a friend and fellow archaeologist, Peggy Guido (1912–1994) in Devizes, Wiltshire. There he worked on preparing a new edition of his 1935 Annotated Herodotus which was never completed. He died at 44 Long Street, Devizes, on 31 March 1991 aged 90. The unfinished Herodotus material was handed over to the Bodleian Library, along with the rest of the Lawrence papers.

Lawrence was a Fellow of the British Academy.

== Books ==
- Lawrence, A. W. Later Greek Sculpture and its Influence. London: Jonathan Cape; New York: Harcourt Brace, 1927.
- Lawrence, A. W. Classical Sculpture – Its History from the Earliest Times to the Death of Constantine. London: Jonathan Cape, 1929.
- Lawrence, A. W., ed. Captives of Tipu: Survivors' Narratives London: Jonathan Cape, 1929.
- Lawrence, A. W., ed. Narratives of the Discovery of America. London: Jonathan Cape, 1931.
- Lawrence, A. W. Herodotus, Rawlinson's Translation Revised and Annotated. London: Nonesuch Press, 1935.
- Lawrence, A. W., ed. T.E. Lawrence by His Friends. London: Jonathan Cape; Garden City, NY: Doubleday, 1937.
- Lawrence, A. W., ed. Oriental Assembly by T.E. Lawrence. London: Williams & Norgate, 1939.
- Lawrence, A. W. Greek Architecture. London: Penguin; New Haven: Yale University Press, 1957; 2nd ed, 1967 (later editions revised by others).
- Lawrence, A. W., ed. Letters to T.E. Lawrence. London: Jonathan Cape, 1962.
- Lawrence, A. W. Trade Castles and Forts of West Africa. London: Jonathan Cape; Palo Alto, CA: Stanford University Press, 1963.
- Lawrence, A. W. Greek and Roman Sculpture. London: Jonathan Cape, 1972.
- Lawrence, A. W. Greek Aims in Fortification. Oxford: Clarendon Press, 1979.

Academic offices
Preceded by A.J.B. Wace	Laurence Professor of Classical Archaeology Cambridge University; 1944–1951	Succeeded by Jocelyn Mary Catherine Toynbee
