= Anthony Snodgrass =

British classical archaeologist (born 1934)

Anthony McElrea Snodgrass FBA (born 7 July 1934, London) is a British classical archaeologist specialising in the pre-Classical period of ancient Greece, particularly the centuries from approximately 1100 to 500 BC. He is Laurence Professor Emeritus of Classical Archaeology at the University of Cambridge, a Fellow of Clare College, Cambridge, and a Senior Fellow of the McDonald Institute for Archaeological Research.

Snodgrass is widely regarded as one of the most influential figures in twentieth-century classical archaeology. His books The Dark Age of Greece (1971) and Archaic Greece: The Age of Experiment (1980) set the agenda for half a century of scholarship on the early first millennium BC in the Aegean. As co-director with John Bintliff of the Boeotia Survey — one of the longest-running and most methodologically rigorous landscape archaeology projects in the Mediterranean he fundamentally shaped the theory and practice of archaeological field survey.

He was elected a Fellow of the British Academy in 1979 and served as its Vice-President from 1990 to 1992. He has served as Honorary President of the British Committee for the Reunification of the Parthenon Marbles since 2010.

== Early life and education ==
Anthony McElrea Snodgrass was born on 7 July 1934 in London, the posthumous son of William McElrea Snodgrass, an army doctor who died on 1 February 1934, and Kathleen (née Owen) Snodgrass.

In 1952 he won a scholarship to Worcester College, University of Oxford. Before taking it up, he completed National Service with the Royal Air Force from 1953 to 1955, serving as a flying officer in Iraq. He returned to Oxford and achieved a First Class in Classical Moderations (Mods) in 1957 and a First Class in Literae Humaniores (Greats) in 1959, earning his Bachelor of Arts from Worcester College.

He then embarked on doctoral research on pre-Classical Greek arms and armour under the supervision of John Boardman, then Reader in Classical Archaeology at Oxford. He was awarded his Doctor of Philosophy in 1963. The doctoral thesis formed the basis of his first book, Early Greek Armour and Weapons (1964).

== Academic career ==
=== University of Edinburgh (1961–1976) ===
While still completing his doctorate, Snodgrass was appointed Lecturer in Classical Archaeology at the University of Edinburgh in 1961. He was promoted to Reader in 1968 and to Professor of Classical Archaeology in 1975. He remained at Edinburgh until 1976, a period of fifteen years during which he produced his most foundational scholarly works.

=== University of Cambridge (1976–2001) ===
In 1976, Snodgrass was appointed the sixth Laurence Professor of Classical Archaeology at the University of Cambridge, succeeding Robert Manuel Cook. He held this Chair until his retirement in 2001, when Martin Millett succeeded him. He was elected a Fellow of Clare College, Cambridge, and later became a Senior Fellow of the McDonald Institute for Archaeological Research.

During his tenure at Cambridge, Snodgrass promoted the integration of material evidence and field survey methodology alongside the traditional study of texts and art. He was elected a Fellow of the British Academy in 1979 and served as Vice-President from 1990 to 1992.

Following retirement in 2001, he retained the title of Laurence Professor Emeritus and continued to research and publish actively.

== Fieldwork ==
=== Early excavations (1960s–1970s) ===
In the 1960s, Snodgrass participated in excavations at Knossos in Crete and at Motya in Sicily. In the 1970s, he took part in excavations at the Menelaion, a sanctuary site in Laconia, southern Greece.

=== Boeotia Survey (1979–present) ===
In 1978, Snodgrass and John Bintliff conducted a joint reconnaissance visit to central Greece to identify a suitable area for intensive regional survey. Field survey began in 1979, focused on the territory of the ancient city of Thespiai in southwest Boeotia.

The Boeotia Survey became one of the most influential archaeological field projects in Mediterranean archaeology, widely recognised for the sophistication and rigour of its methodology and the scale of its twenty-five-year investigation. Survey teams traversed the landscape systematically, collecting artefacts not only from formal archaeological sites but also as off-site material indicative of ancient land use practices such as manuring. This methodology allowed the construction of detailed period and density maps of rural activity — revealing that the classical Greek countryside around Thespiai was covered by a network of small, closely-spaced activity areas interpreted as isolated farmsteads seasonally occupied by agriculturalists.

The results were published through the McDonald Institute for Archaeological Research, Cambridge, including Testing the Hinterland: The Work of the Boeotia Survey 1989–1991 (2007, with Bintliff and Howard), The City of Thespiai: Survey at a Complex Urban Site (2017, with Bintliff, Farinetti, and Slapsak), and Hyettos: the Origins, Florescence and Afterlife of a Small Boeotian City (2025, with Bintliff and Farinetti).

== Scholarship and research ==
=== Dark Age of Greece ===
Snodgrass's 1971 work The Dark Age of Greece: An Archaeological Survey of the Eleventh to the Eighth Centuries BC was the first comprehensive archaeological synthesis of the period between the collapse of Mycenaean civilisation and the beginning of the Archaic period approximately 1100 to 700 BC. Drawing on pottery, burial practices, metalwork, architecture, and what could be recovered of religion and commerce, Snodgrass argued that this was genuinely a dark age a period of population decline, isolation, and loss of skills including writing while also tracing the gradual adoption of iron and the slow recovery of community life. A new edition with an extensive foreword reviewing thirty years of subsequent scholarship was published in 2000.

=== Archaic Greece: The Age of Experiment ===
Archaic Greece: The Age of Experiment (1980) examined the transformative centuries from approximately 700 to 500 BC in which Greek civilisation underwent fundamental changes the development of the polis (city-state), the emergence of coinage and writing, the florescence of lyric poetry, and the rise of monumental architecture and sculpture. Together with The Dark Age of Greece, this book is credited with setting the agenda for half a century of scholarship on the early first millennium BC in the Aegean.

=== Methodology and theory ===
Snodgrass was a prominent advocate for what he termed the autonomy of material evidence the principle that archaeological data could and should be used to address historical questions independently of literary sources, rather than simply illustrating what texts already described. His 1987 work An Archaeology of Greece: The Present State and Future Scope of a Discipline, delivered as the Sather Classical Lectures at the University of California, Berkeley, set out a programmatic vision for a theoretically informed classical archaeology engaging directly with the broader social sciences.

His contribution to the theory and practice of Mediterranean landscape survey through the Boeotia Project equally shaped the discipline at a methodological level, advancing methods of systematic surface collection and off-site artefact analysis that became standard practice in subsequent Mediterranean survey projects.

=== Homer and archaic art ===
In Homer and the Artists: Text and Picture in Early Greek Art (1998), Snodgrass examined the relationship between Homeric epic poetry and early Greek visual art, arguing that artists rarely illustrated scenes from the Iliad or Odyssey directly but instead drew on parallel oral traditions. This contributed significantly to ongoing scholarly debates about the nature of Homeric tradition and the relationship between text and image in the ancient world.

=== Parthenon Marbles ===
Snodgrass served as Chairman of the British Committee for the Reunification of the Parthenon Marbles (BCRPM) from 2002 to 2010 and subsequently as the Committee's Honorary President. He has given lectures throughout Europe and the United States on the case for the restitution of the sculptures, including a lecture titled "The Parthenon Divided" at the Library of Congress in Washington, D.C., in March 2005.

== Personal life ==
Snodgrass married Ann E. Vaughan on 7 November 1959; the marriage ended in divorce in 1978. They had three daughters: Nell Catherine, Rachel Ann, and Elspeth Mary. He married Annemarie Kunzl on 4 September 1983; they have one son, Thomas Anthony. He is a member of the Labour Party. He currently resides in Cambridge.

== Awards and honours ==
- 1952: Scholarship, Worcester College, Oxford
- 1979: Elected Fellow of the British Academy (FBA)
- 1990–1992: Vice-President, British Academy
- 2002–2010: Chairman, British Committee for the Reunification of the Parthenon Marbles
- 2010–present: Honorary President, British Committee for the Reunification of the Parthenon Marbles

== Selected bibliography ==
- Early Greek Armour and Weapons, Edinburgh University Press, 1964.
- Arms and Armour of the Greeks, Thames & Hudson / Cornell University Press, 1967; reprinted Johns Hopkins University Press, 1999.
- The Dark Age of Greece: An Archaeological Survey of the Eleventh to the Eighth Centuries BC, Edinburgh University Press, 1971; new edition Routledge, 2000.
- Archaeology and the Rise of the Greek State, Cambridge University Press, 1977.
- Archaic Greece: The Age of Experiment, J.M. Dent, 1980; Columbia University Press, 1981.
- (Contributor) Sources for Ancient History, Cambridge University Press, 1983.
- An Archaeology of Greece: The Present State and Future Scope of a Discipline, University of California Press, 1987.
- Homer and the Artists: Text and Picture in Early Greek Art, Cambridge University Press, 1998.
- (Editor with Gocha R. Tsetskhladze) Greek Settlements in the Eastern Mediterranean and the Black Sea, Archaeopress, 2002.
- Archaeology and the Emergence of Greece: Collected Papers 1965–2002, Edinburgh University Press, 2006.
- (with J.L. Bintliff and P. Howard) Testing the Hinterland: The Work of the Boeotia Survey 1989–1991, McDonald Institute Monographs, Cambridge, 2007.
- (with J.L. Bintliff, E. Farinetti and B. Slapsak) The City of Thespiai: Survey at a Complex Urban Site, McDonald Institute Monographs, Cambridge, 2017.
- (with J.L. Bintliff and E. Farinetti) Hyettos: the Origins, Florescence and Afterlife of a Small Boeotian City, McDonald Institute Monographs, Cambridge, 2025.
