= Verity Platt =

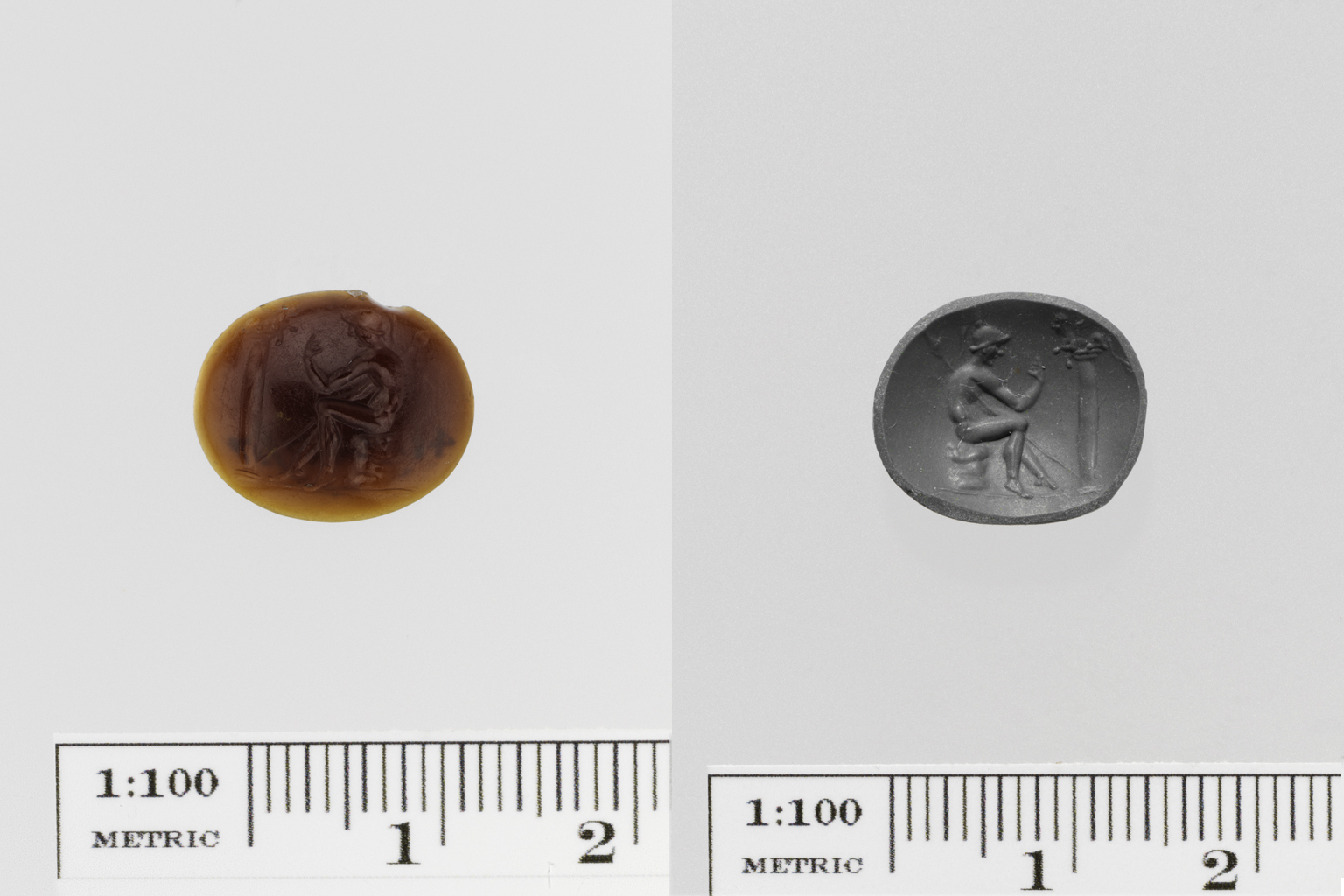
Roman sard ring stone, of the kind that Platt has written about. Ca. 1st century BCE–3rd century CE, showing Oedipus and the Sphinx. Held by The Metropolitan Museum, New York.

Verity Platt (born 1977) is a Professor of Classics and History at Cornell University. She specializes in Greek and Roman art history.

== Education ==
Platt attended The Mount School, York, from 1988 to 1995. She read Classics (Literae Humaniores) at Christ Church, Oxford. Platt was awarded a DPhil. (otherwise known as a PhD) from Christ Church, University of Oxford in 2004. Her doctoral thesis was Epiphany and Representation in Graeco-Roman Culture: Art, Literature, Religion. Her supervisor was Jaś Elsner. She had previously completed a Masters in Classical Art History from the Courtauld Institute of Art, University of London.

== Research and career ==
Before joining Cornell in 2010, Platt held a Junior Research Fellowship at University College, Oxford, and then taught at the University of Chicago.

Platt has published two monographs. In 2011, Platt published the book, Facing the Gods: Epiphany and Representation in Graeco-Roman Art, Literature and Religion. This was published by Cambridge University Press. In 2025, Platt published a monograph, Epistemic Impressions: Making and Mediating Classical Art and Text with Oxford University Press, in the 'Classics in Theory' series. The book explores how Greek authors drew on ancient models of sense-perception when formulating relationships between texts and objects. The book focuses on the language of the impression (typos), addressing the verbal and conceptual strategies that Greek authors employed when dealing with the materiality of artifacts and modes of cultural transmission. In 2017, she published The Frame in Classical Art: A Cultural History, co-edited with Michael Squire.

Platt has held Fellowships at the Institute of Advanced Study, Princeton University, the Franke Institute for the Humanities, University of Chicago, the Society for the Humanities at Cornell, and the Atkinson Center for a Sustainable Future at Cornell. At Cornell, she directs the Humanities Scholars Program. Until the death of Annetta Alexandridis in 2026, Platt co-curated the Cornell Cast Collection with her.
