= Jocelyn Toynbee =

British archaeologist and art historian (1897–1985)

- in 1985 with a marble head artefact
- Born: Jocelyn Mary Catherine Toynbee; 3 March 1897; London, England
- Died: 31 December 1985 (aged 88); Oxford, Oxfordshire, England
- Occupations: Archaeologist, art historian
- Relatives: Arnold J. Toynbee (brother)

Jocelyn Mary Catherine Toynbee, FSA, FBA (3 March 1897 – 31 December 1985) was an English archaeologist and art historian. "In the mid-twentieth century she was the leading British scholar in Roman artistic studies and one of the recognized authorities in this field in the world." Having taught at St Hugh's College, Oxford, the University of Reading, and Newnham College, Cambridge, she became Laurence Professor of Classical Archaeology at the University of Cambridge from 1951 to 1962, the first and so far only woman to hold this position.

== Biography ==
Jocelyn Toynbee was the daughter of Harry Valpy Toynbee, secretary of the Charity Organization Society (1861-1941), and his wife Sarah Edith Marshall (1859–1939), who had been educated at Cambridge University at a time when women could not graduate (the first Cambridge degree awarded to a woman was in 1948). Her brother Arnold J. Toynbee was the noted universal historian. Her sister, Margaret Toynbee (1899-1987) was an Oxford Don.

Toynbee's parents were not wealthy and lived with Harry's retired Uncle (also called Harry Toynbee) in Paddington, London, where she and her siblings were born. Her father had a breakdown when she was around 10 and was institutionalised for the rest of his life meaning that her mother, Edith, was the most dominant figure in the children's lives. She drove them towards scholarships "pouring all her own frustrated education into driving them on to academic success".

Toynbee was awarded a scholarship to and educated at Winchester High School for Girls and (like her mother) at Newnham College, Cambridge (1916–20), where she achieved a First in the Classical Tripos. Toynbee completed her doctoral thesis at Oxford University on the subject of Hadrianic sculpture, awarded her DPhil in 1930.

Toynbee never married. Raised as an Anglican, she converted to Catholicism. Her work with John Bryan Ward-Perkins on the Shrine of St Peter and the Vatican excavations (published in 1956) had a particular significance for her. After retirement from Cambridge, she continued to publish a wide range of academic papers and lived in Oxford with her sister Margaret until her death in 1985.

== Academic career ==
After graduating, Toynbee spent a short time as Assistant Mistress in Classics at Cheltenham Ladies' College before being appointed tutor in classics at St Hugh's College, Oxford (1921–24). She left there in 1924 in protest at the treatment of Cecilia Mary Ady, becoming Lecturer in Classics at Reading University from 1924–27. From 1927 she was Fellow and Director of Studies in Classics at Newnham College, Cambridge, appointed Lecturer in 1931, where her students included Lilian Hamilton Jeffery and Joan Liversidge. In 1951 she became the fourth Laurence Professor of Classical Archaeology (1951–1962), the only female to hold this prestigious Chair. Toynbee was awarded various research awards and was a student in the 1920s at both the British School at Athens and the British School at Rome, maintaining strong links with the latter throughout her career, and serving as the Chair of the Faculty from 1954-59. Her earlier visits to the British School at Rome brought her into contact with Eugénie Sellers Strong who was an influence on Roman art. Toynbee wrote an obituary for Strong after her death in 1943 and dedicated her Thames and Hudson Monograph on 'The Art of the Romans' to Strong in 1965.

Her research interests ranged widely, including sculpture, coins and medals, painting, mosaics, gemstones, metalwork and much else. She joined Ward-Perkins and Kathleen Kenyon on a survey of Roman and Christian remains in Tripolitania in 1948. In 1949, she is pictured attending the inaugural Congress of Roman Frontier Studies in Newcastle.

In the summer of 1961, Toynbee wrote the handlist and catalogue for a major exhibition at the Goldsmiths' Hall, London to mark the 50th year of The Roman Society on the subject of Roman Art in Britain, resulting in a key publication. She was Vice-President of The Roman Society from 1946. A review of the Roman Society for its centenary suggests that Margerie Venables Taylor hoped to have Toynbee appointed President in 1962 but that a trial session of Council made it clear that she was too deaf to function effectively in the post.

A complete list of her works to 1972 was published in the Papers of the British School at Rome. Other key works produced in retirement included 'Death and Burial in the Roman World' in 1971 and 'Animals in Roman Life and Art' in 1973, dedicated in Latin to her white cat, Mithras. A painting of her by Catriona Jane Cursham held in Newnham College depicts her with a curled up white cat.

== Honours ==
Toynbee was elected a Fellow of the Society of Antiquaries (FSA) in 1943. She was awarded the medal of the Royal Numismatic Society in 1948. In 1952, she was elected a Fellow of the British Academy (FBA). In 1956 she was awarded the Huntington Medal of the American Numismatic Society. She was awarded Honorary Doctorates from the Universities of Newcastle (1967) and Liverpool (1968).

She was elected a Foreign Honorary Member of the American Academy of Arts and Sciences in 1973. In 1977, an edited volume of 20 papers was published in honour of her eightieth birthday, in which Martin Robertson states that “No one has done more than she – no one perhaps so much – to establish and make clear the profound unity of the Greco-Roman artistic tradition”. She was awarded the Frend Medal from the Society of Antiquaries of London for her work on early Christian Archaeology in 1984.

A further collected volume of papers in memory of Toynbee was published in 1988.

== Key works ==
- The Hadrianic school: a chapter in the history of Greek art, 1934
- Roman Medallions, 1944
- Some Notes on Artists in the Roman World, Brussels, 1951
- Christianity in Roman Britain, 1953
- The Ara Pacis Reconsidered, Proc. Brit. Acad. ,1953
- (with J.B. Ward-Perkins) The Shrine of St Peter and the Vatican Excavations, 1956
- The Flavian Reliefs from the Palazzo delle Cancellaria in Rome, 1957
- Art in Roman Britain, 1962
- Art in Britain under the Romans, 1964
- The Art of the Romans, 1965
- Death and Burial in the Roman World, 1971
- Animals in Roman Life and Art, 1973
- Roman Historical Portraits, 1978
- The Roman Art Treasures from The Temple of Mithras 1986

Academic offices
| Preceded by Arnold Walter Lawrence | Laurence Professor of Classical Archaeology Cambridge University; 1951 - 1962 | Succeeded by Robert Manuel Cook |
