= Martin Millett =

British archaeologist (born 1955)

Martin Millett FBA FSA
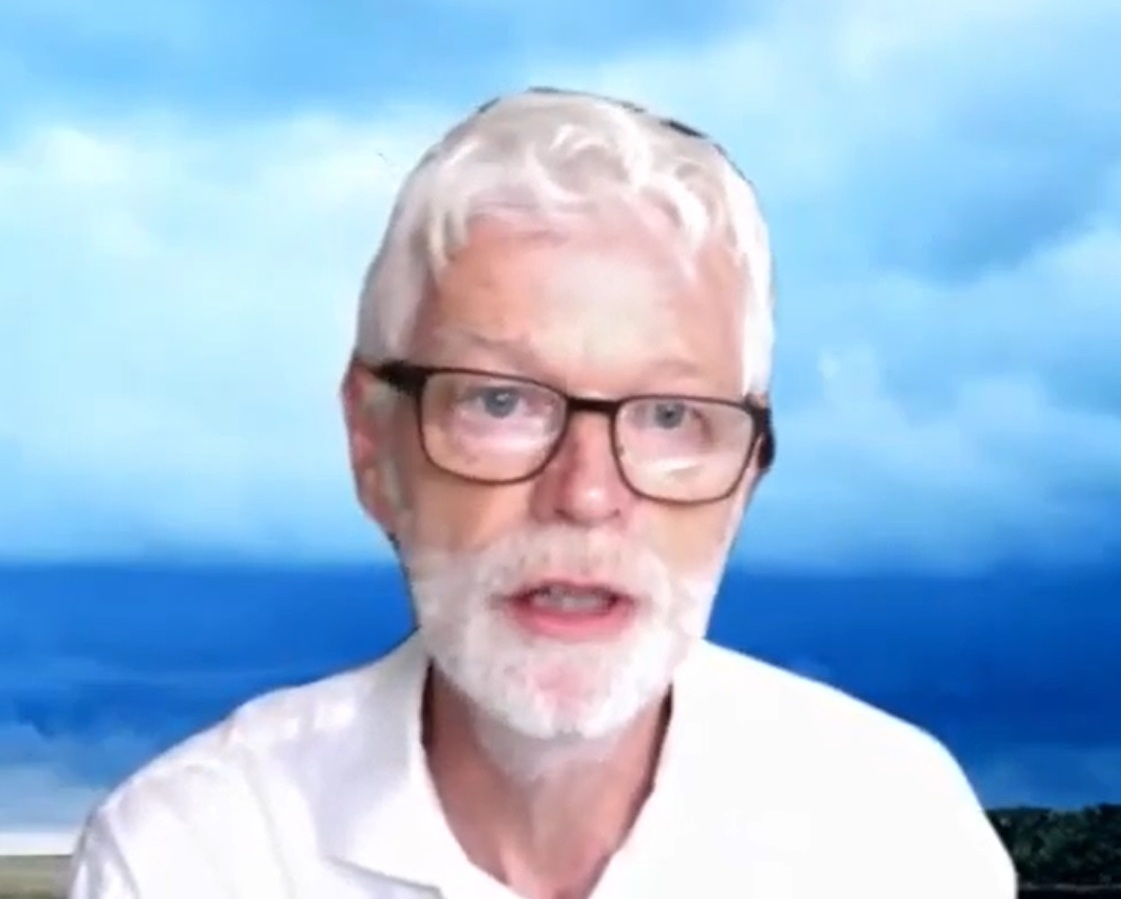
- Millett in 2021
- Born: Martin John Millett; 30 September 1955 (age 71)
- Awards: Fellow of the Society of Antiquaries (1984); Fellow of the British Academy (2006)

Academic background
- Education: University College London (BA); Merton College, Oxford (DPhil)
- Thesis: A comparative study of some contemporaneous pottery assemblages from Roman Britain (1980)

Academic work
- Discipline: Archaeology
- Sub-discipline: Classical archaeology
- Institutions: Durham University; University of Southampton; University of Cambridge

Martin John Millett, FBA, FSA (born 30 September 1955) is a British archaeologist and academic. From 2001 to 2022, he was the Laurence Professor of Classical Archaeology at the University of Cambridge and a professorial fellow of Fitzwilliam College, Cambridge. Since 2021, he has been the president of the Society of Antiquaries of London.

== Early life and education ==
Millett was born on 30 September 1955. He was educated at Weydon County Secondary School, a state school in Wrecclesham, Farnham, and Farnham College, a sixth form college in Farnham, Surrey. He went on to study at the Institute of Archaeology, University College London, graduating with a Bachelor of Arts. He then undertook postgraduate studies at Merton College, Oxford, completing his Doctor of Philosophy (DPhil) degree in 1980. His doctoral thesis was titled A comparative study of some contemporaneous pottery assemblages from Roman Britain.

== Academic career ==
Millett was the assistant curator of archaeology at the Hampshire County Museums from 1980 to 1981. He then began his academic career, and joined Durham University in 1981. He was a lecturer from 1981 to 1991, and senior lecturer from 1991 to 1995. He was Professor of Archaeology between 1995 and 1998.

Millett then moved to the University of Southampton where he was Professor of Archaeology from 1999 to 2001. In 2001, he joined the University of Cambridge as the Laurence Professor of Classical Archaeology. The appointment was accompanied by a Fellowship of Fitzwilliam College, Cambridge. In 2012, he was appointed head of the School of Arts and Humanities at Cambridge.

Millett excavated a Roman-period site in Yorkshire (with Peter Halkon). He is the director of the Roman Towns Project (with Simon Keay and the British School at Rome), and also the director of the Greek Colonization and Archaeology of European Development project. Millett has profoundly changed Romano-British archaeology by implementing and calling for new approaches to the excavated materials.

Outside his university work Millett holds a number of appointments. He is a vice-president of the British Academy with responsibility for the British Academy Sponsored Institutes and Societies. He has held three senior positions at the Society of Antiquaries of London: he was director from 2001 to 2007, treasurer from 2007 to 2011, and its president since 2021. He is a member of the Antiquity Trust, which supports the publication of the archaeology journal Antiquity.

== Honours ==
On 3 May 1984, Millett was elected Fellow of the Society of Antiquaries of London (FSA). In 2006, he was elected Fellow of the British Academy (FBA). In 2021, he was elected member of the Academia Europaea.

== Select bibliography ==
- 1980: The Roman Riverside Wall and Monumental Arch in London - Excavations at Baynard's Castle, Upper Thames Street, London, 1974-76. (With Charles Hill and T. F. C. Blagg. London: London and Middlesex Archaeological Society). ISBN 9780903290180.
- 1986: Excavations on the Romano-British Small Town at Neatham, Hampshire, 1969-1979. (With David Graham. Southampton: Hampshire Field Club). ISBN 9780907473015.
- 1990: The Romanization of Britain: an essay in archaeological interpretation (Cambridge: Cambridge University Press) (Paperback edition issued 1992). ISBN 9780521428644.
- 1995: Roman Britain (UK; English Heritage/Batsford) (Second edition 2005). ISBN 9780713489514.
- 1995 (with J. M. Carreté and S. J. Keay) A Roman Provincial Capital and its Hinterland: the survey of the territory of Tarragona, 1985-1990 (Ann Arbor, Michigan: Journal of Roman Archaeology Supplementary Series no. 15)
- 1995 (edited with J. Metzler, N. Roymans and J. Slofstra) Integration in the Early Roman West: the role of culture and ideology (Dossiers d'Archéologie du Musée National d'Histoire et d'Art IV (IVth Archaeological Papers of the National Museum of History and Art, Luxembourg). ISBN 9782879640334.
- 1999 (with P. Halkon) Rural Settlement and Industry: studies in the Iron Age and Roman archaeology of lowland East Yorkshire (Yorkshire Archaeological Society Roman Antiquities Section monograph no. 4). ISBN 0902122908.
- 2001 (edited with J. Pearce and M. Struck) Burial Practice in the Roman World: contextual studies (Oxford: Oxbow Books). ISBN 9781842170342.
- 2001 (edited with S. T. James) Britons and Romans: advancing an archaeological agenda (York: Council for British Archaeology Research Report 125). ISBN 1902771168. doi:10.5284/1081753.
- Shiptonthorpe, East Yorkshire: archaeological studies of a Romano-British roadside settlement (Yorkshire Archaeological Society Roman Antiquities Section monograph). doi:10.1080/00665983.2007.11020726.
- 2005 (with S. Keay, L. Paroli, and K. Strutt) Portus: An Archaeological Survey of the Port of Imperial Rome (British School at Rome Monograph) Right. ISBN 9780904152470.
- 2013: Ocriculum (Otricoli, Umbria) - An Archaeological Survey of the Roman Town. (With Sophie Hay and SJ Keay. The British School at Rome). ISBN 9780904152678.
- 2014: AD 410: The History and Archaeology of Late and Post-Roman Britain. (With Neil Faulkner et al. Society for the Promotion of Roman Studies). ISBN 9780907764403.
- 2015: Hayton, East Yorkshire - Archaeological Studies of the Iron Age and Roman Landscapes. Volume 1 (With P. Halkon and Helen Woodhouse. Yorkshire Archaeological Society, Roman Antiquities Section). ISBN 9780993238321.
- 2016: Cartimandua's capital? The late Iron Age royal site at Stanwick, North Yorkshire, fieldwork and analysis 1981–2011. (With Colin Haselgrove, et al. Council for British Archaeology). doi:10.5284/1081853.
- 2020: Isurium Brigantum - An Archaeological Survey of Roman Aldborough. (With Rose Ferraby. Society of Antiquaries of London). ISBN 9780854313013.
- 2023: Interamna Lirenas - A Roman Town in Central Italy Revealed. (With Alessandro Launaro. McDonald Institute for Archaeological Research). ISBN 9781913344108.

A full bibliography is available at the Archaeological Data Service page for Millett.

Academic offices
Preceded by Anthony Snodgrass	Laurence Professor of Classical Archaeology; Cambridge University; 2001 - 2022	Succeeded by Michael Squire
