= John Manuel Cook =

British classical archaeologist and ancient historian (1910–1994)

John Manuel Cook, FBA (1910–1994) was a British classical archaeologist. He was educated at Marlborough College, and went to King's College, Cambridge (1929–32).

His older brother was Robert Manuel Cook, also a noted scholar of antiquity.

== Career ==
In 1934–1936, he worked at the British School at Athens, studying archaic Greek pottery. He published an important study on the subject in the annual of the British School in 1938.

In 1936 he was appointed assistant in humanity, and in 1938 lecturer in classics at Edinburgh University.

In 1939, he married Enid May Robertson (1912/13–1976), who was also a classical scholar. They had two sons.

During the Second World War Cook served in the Royal Scots regiment, and in the intelligence corps. In 1943 he was parachuted into western Greece, to serve with the resistance.

== After World War II ==
He was a director of the British School at Athens from 1946 to 1954 and professor of ancient history and classical archaeology at the University of Bristol from 1958 to 1976.

He is known for his explorations in the Troad, such as at Achilleion (Troad), Lamponeia, Neandreia and Cebrene.

In 1948–51, he excavated at Old Smyrna (Bayrakli) in collaboration with Ankara University.

Starting in 1969, with his wife, he explored the archaeological sites in Iran, studying the Achaemenid empire.

He was fellow of the Society of Antiquaries (1948), of the German Archaeological Institute, and of the British Academy (1974).

== Research in Anatolia ==
Throughout the 1950s, Cook and G.E. Bean conducted exhaustive archaeological surveys in Caria.

They noted some Submycenean remains at Asarlik, and the Mycenaean remains at Miletus and near Mylasa. Cook also drew attention to the similarities between the Carians and the Mycenaeans,

"Finds of third-millennium date are confined to a very few points on or near the Aegean coast, with the curious exception of one find-spot which seems to be near Yatağan at the head of the Marsyas valley. No second-millennium remains are known apart from the Mycenaean at Miletus, the Submycenaean at Asarlik (Termera) opposite Cos, and the reports of Mycenaean from the vicinity of Mylasa. It is now asserted by some scholars that the Carians were a people, perhaps Indo-European, who inhabited the interior of Anatolia and only descended to Caria and the Aegean at the end of the Bronze Age; but this is far from harmonising with the Greek tradition about them, and the writer for one finds it difficult to explain the Mycenaean in Caria (and perhaps adjacent islands) as being anything other than Carian. Our difficulty with early Caria is that we have no means as yet of distinguishing Carians; archaeologically their culture appears as little more than a reflection of contemporary Greek culture."

== Bibliography ==
- Urbis-libnet.org catalog entry
- WorldCat catalog entry
- John Manuel Cook, R.V. Nicholls, Old Smyrna excavations / The temples of Athena. London : British School at Athens, 1998.
- John Manuel Cook, The Troad. Oxford : Clarendon Pr., 1973.
- John Manuel Cook, The Persian Empire. New York : Schocken Books, 1983.
- John Manuel Cook, The Greeks in Ionia and the East. New York, Praeger, [1963].
- John Manuel Cook, Sanctuary of Hemithea at Kastabos. 1966.
- J. M. Cook, Greek settlement in the Eastern Aegean and Asia Minor. Revised edition. Cambridge: Cambridge University Press, 1961.
