= Paul A. Kottman =

American translator (born 1970)

- Born: 1970 (age 55–56)

Education
- Education: University of California, Berkeley

Philosophical work
- Era: Contemporary philosophy
- Region: Western Philosophy
- Main interests: Comparative literature; philosophy; aesthetics

Paul A. Kottman (born 1970) is a comparatist, philosopher, and literary critic. He is Professor of Comparative Literature at the New School for Social Research in New York City, where he is Chair of the Committee on Liberal Studies, co-directs the Institute for Philosophy and the New Humanities, and is affiliated with the Philosophy Department.

Kottman is known for his 2017 book Love as Human Freedom. Rather than see love as a natural form of affection, Kottman sees love as a practice that changes over time through which new social realities are brought into being—including the rise of feminism and the emergence of bourgeois family life, the struggles for abortion rights and birth control and the erosion of a gender-based division of labor.

Kottman is also known for his philosophical readings of Shakespeare, and Shakespearean tragedy, in various essays and in his book Tragic Conditions in Shakespeare]. According to Kottman, "Shakespearean tragedy works through the loss of any 'given' — nature, or God, or “fate” — that might explain human societies, histories, actions, destinies, relationships and values. At the same time, Shakespearean tragedy works through the loss of social bonds on which we depend for the meaning and worth of our lives together — showing those bonds to be, in spite of that dependence, fully dissolvable. "

Kottman is the editor of a book series at Stanford University Press, Square One: First Order Questions in the Humanities, is on the editorial board of Cultura della Modernità (Edizioni ETS, Italy), and the advisory boards of Columbia Themes in Philosophy, Social Criticism and the Arts (Columbia University Press) and Corpus: Filosofie e sapere (Paparo Edizioni, Italy)

Kottman holds the Abilitazione, Professore Ordinario in Filosofia, Estetica (Professor of Philosophy, Aesthetics) in Italy. He has held Visiting Professorships at Fudan University in Shanghai (2019), the University del Piemonte Orientale, (2006); the University of Tokyo (2011–12); the Università degli studi di Verona; Instituto per gli studi filosofici, Naples; and the International Chair in Political Languages, Dipartimento di Politiche Pubbliche e Scelte Colletive (POLIS). He has held a fellowship at Internationales Kolleg Morphomata, Universität zu Köln], the New Institute in Hamburg, and is Full Professor of Philosophy (Aesthetics), Italy National Scientific Committee.

== Bibliography ==
- (2017) Love as Human Freedom, Stanford: Stanford University Press ISBN 978-1503602274
- (2017) The Art of Hegel's Aesthetics: Hegelian Philosophy and the Perspectives of Art History Michael Squire, co-editor (Wilhelm Fink, 2017) ISBN 9783770562855
- (2017) The Insistence of Art: Aesthetic Philosophy after Early Modernity (Fordham University Press, 2017) ISBN 9780823275809
- (2014) Una politica della scena: Una lettura filosofica di Shakespeare; Italian translation of A Politics of the Scene (Mimesis edizioni, ISBN 978-8857519913
- (2009) Tragic Conditions in Shakespeare, Baltimore: Johns Hopkins University Press. ISBN 978-0801893711
- (2008) A Politics of the Scene, Stanford: Stanford University Press. ISBN 978-0804758345
- (2008) Philosophers on Shakespeare Stanford University Press ISBN 9780804759205
