= Laurence Professor of Classical Archaeology =

Endowed chair in archaeology

The Laurence Professorship of Classical Archaeology at the University of Cambridge was established in 1930 as one of the offices endowed by the bequest of Sir Perceval Maitland Laurence.

== Laurence Professors of Classical Archaeology ==
- Arthur Bernard Cook (1931–1934)
- Alan John Bayard Wace (1934–1944)
- Arnold Walter Lawrence (1944–1951)
- Jocelyn Mary Catherine Toynbee (1951–1962)
- Robert Manuel Cook (1962–1976)
- Anthony McElrea Snodgrass (1976–2001)
- Martin Millett (2001–2022)
- Michael Squire (2022–)
