= Perceval Maitland Laurence =

Classical scholar and judge

Sir Perceval Maitland Laurence KCMG (20 April 1854 – 28 February 1930) was an English classical scholar, judge in South Africa and a benefactor of the University of Cambridge and the University of Cape Town.

== Early life and education ==
Perceval Maitland Laurence was born on 20 April 1854 in Woking the eldest son of Perceval Laurence, a clergyman, and Isabella Sarah Moorsom. One of his brothers was Henry Hamilton Laurence, a graduate of New College, Oxford, and a barrister-at-law at Georgetown, Guyana.

In 1872 Laurence went up to Corpus Christi College, Cambridge, to read Classics, graduating with first class honours in 1876. His father had attended Trinity College, Cambridge, and both father and son were Presidents of the Cambridge Union Society; the younger Laurence held office in the Easter Term of 1874.

== The law ==
On graduating his studies, Laurence turned to the law. As a fellow of Corpus Christi, he was awarded the Yorke Prize in 1878 for his essay, written jointly with Courtney Stanhope Kenny, on The Law and Custom of Primogeniture, the Master of Laws degree in 1879, the Chancellor's Gold Medal for Legal Studies and in 1885 the degree of Doctor of Laws.

Laurence was called to the Bar by Lincoln's Inn on 18 November 1878 but the effects of tuberculosis curtailed his English practice of the law and took him instead to the Cape Colony for the beneficial effect of the drier climate. He practised initially in Kimberley before being appointed second puisne judge of the High Court of Griqualand in 1882 and subsequently becoming Judge President in 1888. After moving to Cape Town in 1905, he served as Chairman of the War Losses Compensation Commission and the Transvaal Delimitation Commissions, for which he was knighted in 1906.

== Retirement ==
In 1913 Laurence retired and returned to England. In 1914 he was made an honorary fellow of Corpus Christi College. In 1921–23 he served on the Royal Commission on Fire Brigades and Fire Prevention. An admirer of the influential Jewish politician Saul Solomon and an advocate of the Cape Qualified Franchise, Laurence believed in equality of all men, regardless of race. Laurence's final work was a biography of John Xavier Merriman, the last prime minister of the Cape Colony, published in 1930, the year of Laurence's death.

== Benefactor ==
Laurence died on 28 February 1930. By his will he endowed funds at Cambridge University for the benefit of the Cambridge University Library, to establish the Laurence Professorship of Ancient Philosophy and the Laurence Professorship of Classical Archaeology and to provide funds generally for the purposes of classical studies. He also endowed his college, Corpus Christi, with funds to support the study of classics and prizes in his name continue to be awarded. In 1925 he endowed the University of Cape Town with the Sir Laurence Gift which supports the Laurence Prize (awarded annually to the best undergraduate student in Ancient Greek).

== Publications ==
- Two Essays on the Law of Primogeniture (with Courtney Stanhope Kenny), 1878, reprinted by Kessinger Publishing 2008. ISBN 1-4374-3250-6.
- Judges and Litigants, London 1879.
- Collectanea: Essays, Addresses And Reviews, 1899, reprinted by Kessinger Publishing June 2008. ISBN 1-4368-0934-7.
- Catalogue of the Kimberley Public Library, 1891, Compiled by P. M. Laurence ASIN: B0014NV3JE.
- Reports of Cases Decided in the High Court of Griqualand. Reported by P. M. Laurence ASIN: B0014JX9DQ.
- On Circuit in Kaffirland, and Other Sketches and Studies, 1903.
- The Life of John Xavier Merriman, Constable, London, 1930.
