= Stoke Damerel Community College =

Location
- Somerset Place; Plymouth, Devon, PL3 4BD; England
- Coordinates: 50.38129°N 4.15909°W

Information
- Type: Academy
- Local authority: Plymouth City Council
- Department for Education URN: 136626 Tables
- Ofsted: Reports
- Gender: Coeducational
- Age: 11 to 18
- Enrollment: 1400
- Website: Stoke Damerel College

Stoke Damerel Community College is a coeducational secondary school and sixth form located in Stoke, Plymouth, England.

Stoke Damerel Community College was formed after the closure of Penlee Secondary Modern in the late 1980s. The school has recently had major building and refurbishment work completed to improve its entrance and create larger, more modern open spaces.

Work included "The Street", a large central corridor to help congestion and provide a social area for the students, an extended library with over a hundred flat screen computers, a larger and better equipped Sixth Form common room and sports facilities. The school is on a hill with panoramic views of Plymouth and admits pupils from 11 to 18. The sixth form offers A levels, AS levels, and BTEC qualifications. The school has around 750 computers. The school became an academy in 2011.
