= Pat Southern =

English historian of classical Rome (born 1948)

Patricia Southern (born 1948) is an English historian of classical Rome.

== Early life ==
Born in 1948 near Altrincham, Cheshire, Southern studied Ancient History and Archaeology with the Universities of London and Newcastle upon Tyne.

== Career ==
Southern was the librarian of the Department of Archaeology at the University of Newcastle upon Tyne from 1983 to 1996 and later at the library of the Newcastle upon Tyne Literary and Philosophical Society. She has published 13 books on Roman history and archaeology and contributed numerous articles on Roman history to the BBC History website and the academic Roman studies journal Britannia.

She has also written a history of her home town of Altrincham.

Southern's first two books The Roman Cavalry and The Late Roman Army were co-authored and illustrated by Karen Dixon. Dixon also illustrated several other books in the publisher's catalogue. Dixon's analysis of morale in the late Roman Army was well received and influenced the development of the study of military psychology in history pioneered by John Keegan in The Face of Battle.

== Selected publications ==
- Dixon, Karen & Southern, Pat The Roman Cavalry 1992, Batsford, London ISBN 0-7134-6396-1
- Southern, Pat. "Comparative Frontier Studies", in Scott, E. (ed) Theoretical Roman Archaeology: First Conference Proceedings, 1996, Aldershot, Avebury. pp. 147–154. doi:10.16995/TRAC1991_147_154
- Southern, Pat & Dixon, Karen The Late Roman Army 1996, Batsford, London ISBN 0-7134-7047-X
- Southern, Pat Domitian: Tragic Tyrant 1997, Batsford ISBN 978-0-415-16525-9
- Southern, Pat Mark Antony 1998, Tempus ISBN 0-7524-1406-2
- Southern, Pat Cleopatra 1998, Tempus ISBN 0-7524-4336-4
- Southern, Pat The Roman Empire from Severus to Constantine 2001, Routledge ISBN 0-415-23944-3
- Southern, Pat Augustus 2001, Routledge ISBN 0-415-25855-3
- Southern, Pat Julius Caesar 2001, Tempus ISBN 0-7524-4394-1
- Southern, Pat Pompey the Great: Caesar's Friend and Foe 2003, The History Press ISBN 0-7524-2521-8
- Southern, Pat The Roman Army: A Social and Institutional History 2007, Oxford University Press ISBN 978-0-19-532878-3
- Southern, Pat Antony and Cleopatra 2009, The History Press ISBN 0-7524-4383-6
- Southern, Pat Ancient Rome: The Rise and Fall of an Empire 753BC-AD476 2009, Amberly ISBN 1-84868-100-3
- Southern, Pat Empress Zenobia: Palmyra's Rebel Queen 2009, Hambledon Continuum ISBN 978-1-84725-034-6
- Southern, Pat The Story of Altrincham 2008, Amberly ISBN 978-1-84868-080-7
- Southern, Pat Rome's Empire: How the Romans Acquired and Lost Their Provinces 2023, Amberly
