= Hella Eckardt =

British archaeologist

Hella Eckardt FSA
- Awards: Archaeologist of the Year (2018)

Academic background
- Education: University of Reading

Academic work
- Discipline: Archaeology
- Sub-discipline: Classical archaeology Roman archaeology
- Institutions: University of Reading

Hella Eckardt FSA is an archaeologist specializing in Roman archaeology and material culture, currently serving as a professor at the University of Reading. In 2018 Eckardt won the Archaeologist of the Year Award. She was the Editor of the journal Britannia from 2018 to 2021, and since 2026 has been President of The Roman Society.

== Career ==
Eckardt studied for a bachelor's degree at the Johannes Gutenberg University Mainz, a master's degree at the University of London, before completing her doctorate at the University of Reading. She was elected as a Fellow of the Society of Antiquaries of London in 2006. In 2018, Eckardt won the Archaeologist of the Year award, organised by Current Archaeology; the award cited her work on Roman material culture and "[pioneering of] the large-scale application of isotope and ancestry analysis to late Roman skeletons". Eckardt was the editor of the journal Britannia, published by Cambridge University Press, from 2018 to 2021 and remained on the editorial board afterwards.

Eckardt gave the keynote speech at the Theoretical Roman Archaeology Conference 2017, entitled "Roman Objects, Migrants and Identities in the Age of Brexit and Trump". Her paper discussed how developing technologies, such as ancient DNA (aDNA), that affect how we see geography and race in the past will influence modern perspectives on those topics. In 2026, Eckardt was appointed president of The Roman Society.

=== Romans Revealed ===
Along with Mary Lewis and Gundula Müldner, Eckardt led a project researching the archaeological evidence for immigration in Roman Britain and how these people interacted. The project was funded by the Arts and Humanities Research Council (£337,000) and the results were used to inform displays at the Yorkshire Museum and create educational resources for Key Stage 2 pupils. The team produced the 'Romans Revealed' website (romansrevealed.com) aimed at school children to give more information on Roman Britain, broadening the history taught in schools which usually focuses on men from Italy. The AHRC provided additional funding (62,000) while the Runnymede Trust also supported the project to help the website addressed what children wanted to learn about.

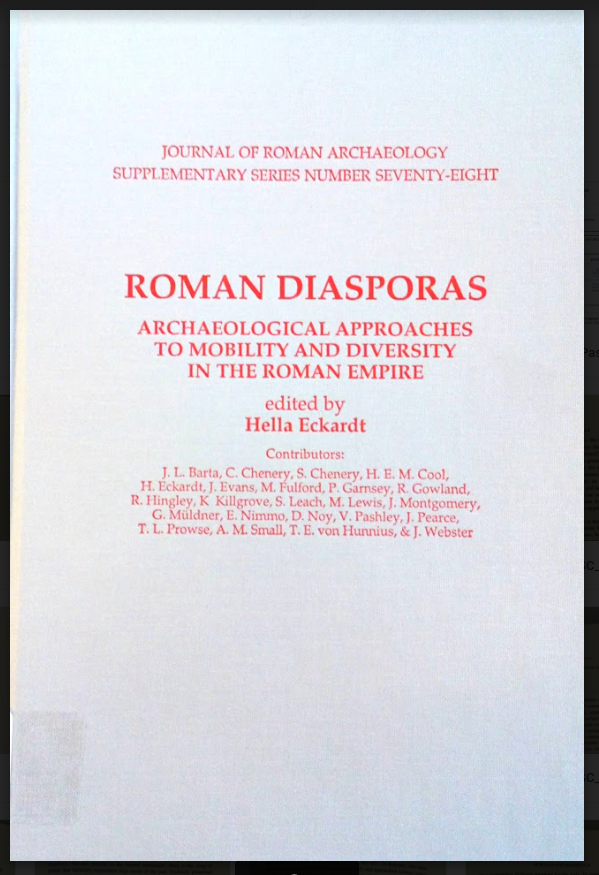
Front Cover Image of Hella Eckardt (editor), Roman diasporas: archaeological approaches to mobility and diversity in the Roman empire

== Select works ==
- Eckardt, Hella; Crummy, Nina (2008). Styling the body in late Iron Age and Roman Britain: a contextual approach to toilet instruments. Instrumentum Monograph. Vol. 36. Montagnac: Instrumentum. ISBN 9782355180095.
- Eckardt, Hella, ed. (2010). Roman Diasporas: Archaeological Approaches to Mobility and Diversity in the Roman Empire. Journal of Roman Archaeology Supplementary Series. Vol. 78. Portsmouth, Rhode Island: Journal of Roman Archaeology. ISBN 9781887829786.
- Eckardt, Hella; Muldner, Gundula; Lewis, Mary (2014). "People on the move in Roman Britain". World Archaeology. 46 (4): 534–550. doi:10.1080/00438243.2014.931821.
- Eckardt, Hella (2014). Objects and Identities: Roman Britain and the north-western provinces. Oxford: Oxford University Press. ISBN 9780199693986.
- Eckardt, Hella (2018). Writing and power in the Roman world: literacies and material culture. New York: Cambridge University Press. ISBN 9781108418058.
- Eckardt, Hella; Walton, Philippa (2021). Bridge over troubled water: The Roman finds from the River Tees at Piercebridge in context. Britannia Monograph. Vol. 34. London: Society for the Promotion of Roman Studies.
