= Louise Revell =

Roman archaeologist

Academic background
- Education: University of Cambridge; Durham University; University of Southampton
- Thesis: Exploring Roman Identities : Case-studies from Spain and Britain in the Second century AD (2000)

Academic work
- Discipline: Archaeology
- Sub-discipline: Roman archaeology
- Institutions: University of Southampton

Louise Revell is an archaeologist specialising in Roman archaeology. She is associate professor in Roman Studies at the University of Southampton. Revell's research focuses on provincial archaeology of the Western Roman Empire.

== Education ==
Revell obtained a BA in classics from the University of Cambridge, and a MA in Roman Archaeology from Durham University. She completed her PhD in 2000 at the University of Southampton, entitled Exploring Roman Identities : Case-studies from Spain and Britain in the Second century AD.

== Career ==
Revell's research focuses on the inter linkages between identity, ideology and imperialism, and their expression through material culture. Recent research has looked at Roman imperialism in the Spanish provinces and Britain. Her 2009 monograph Roman Imperialism and Local Identities was described as "refreshing and theoretically informed perspective" and an "important step forward for studies of Romanisation", and was widely reviewed. Revell's 2013 monograph Ways of Being Roman explored the relationship between Roman identities and daily practice as they were experienced through public architecture in the provinces, described as "a valuable overview of current identity studies as applied to the western Roman provinces". Revell's research has also explored gender, family and the life-course within the western provinces. She co-edited the 2016 Oxford Handbook of Roman Britain with Martin Millett and Alison Moore.

In 2001, the Theoretical Roman Archaeology Conference formed a standing committee to oversee the conference, consisting of Revell, Martin Carruthers, Carol van Driel-Murray, Andrew Gardner, Jason Lucas, and Ellen Swift. The committee also edited the proceedings for the 2001 conference.

Revell holds a Getty Fellowship as part of the Arts of Rome's Provinces workshop. She is a trustee of the Roman Research Trust, and a member of the editorial board of Britannia. She has appeared on Time Team.

She delivered the keynote lecture at the Crasis Annual Meeting at the University of Groningen in 2019.

== Selected publications ==
=== Books ===
- Revell, L. (2009). Roman Imperialism and Local Identities. Cambridge: Cambridge University Press.
- Revell, L. (2015). Ways of Being Roman: Discourses of Identity in the Roman West. Oxford: Oxbow Books.
- Millett, M., Revell, L., & Moore, A. (eds) (2016). The Oxford Handbook of Roman Britain. Oxford: Oxford University Press.

=== Articles ===
- Revell, L. (2005). The Roman life course: a view from the inscriptions. European Journal of Archaeology 8(1), 43–63. DOI: 10.1177/1461957105058209
- Revell, L. (2007). Religion and ritual in the western provinces. Greece and Rome 54, 210–228.
- Revell, L. (2013). Code-switching and identity in the western provinces. Herom 2(1), 121–139.
