= Mary Lewis (archaeologist) =

British archaeologist

- Occupations: Archaeologist; Lecturer

Academic background
- Education: University of Leicester; University of Bradford
- Thesis: The impact of urbanisation and industrialisation in medieval and post-medieval Britain (1999)
- Doctoral advisor: Charlotte Roberts

Academic work
- Discipline: Archaeology
- Sub-discipline: Bioarchaeology; Roman archaeology; Medieval archaeology
- Institutions: University of Reading
- Website: reading.ac.uk/archaeology/about/staff/m-e-lewis.aspx

Mary Lewis is Professor of Bioarchaeology at the University of Reading. After completing a PhD in bioarchaeology at the University of Bradford in 1999, Lewis went on to lecture at Bournemouth University (2000–2004) before moving to the University of Reading in 2004. She conducted the first osteological study of a body which has been hanged, drawn, and quartered. Lewis has held editorial roles with the International Journal of Osteoarchaeology, International Journal of Paleopathology, and the American Journal of Biological Anthropology.

== Career ==
Mary Lewis completed a BA in archaeology at the University of Leicester in 1992 and attended the University of Bradford where she studied for an MSc in Osteology, Palaeopathology and Funerary Archaeology and a PhD in bioarchaeology. Her thesis was titled The impact of urbanisation and industrialisation in medieval and post-medieval Britain: an assessment of the morbidity and mortality of non-adult skeletons from the cemeteries of two urban and two rural sites in England (AD 850–1859) supervised by Charlotte Roberts. While at Bradford, Lewis and Roberts examined human remains excavated from the church of St Helen-on-the-Walls in York. Looking at 2,000 skeletons, it was one of the first studies to use archaeological evidence to examine how the environment effects health. They found that people living in the industrial area of medieval York were more likely to develop sinus infections than people from rural areas exposed to less air pollution.

Lewis joined the University of Reading in 2004. Lewis conducted the first osteological study of the skeleton of a man who had been hanging, drawing, and quartering. The man is believed to be Hugh Despenser the Younger. The results were published in the 2008 edition of Antiquity and shortlisted for the Ben Cullen prize.

Along with Reading University colleagues Gundula Müldner and Hella Eckardt, Lewis took part a research project to examine the archaeological evidence for immigration in Roman Britain and how these people interacted. The project, which began in 2007, was funded by the Arts and Humanities Research Council (£337,000) and the results were used to inform displays at the Yorkshire Museum and create educational resources for Key Stage 2 pupils. The team produced the 'Romans Revealed' website aimed at school children to give more information on Roman Britain, broadening the history taught in schools which usually focuses on men from Italy. The AHRC provided additional funding (62,000) while the Runnymede Trust also supported the project to help the website addressed what children wanted to learn about.

Between 2011 and 2014, Lewis was Principal Investigator working with Janet Montgomery and Fiona Shapland on the Leverhulme-funded project 'Adolescence, Migration and Health in Medieval England: the osteological evidence'. The project examined remains of over 2000 adolescent skeletons aged 10–25 from cemeteries in England, including St Mary Spital and Barton-on-Humber. In 2016, Lewis won the Society for Medieval Archaeology's Martyn Jope Award for "the best novel interpretation, application of analytical method or presentation of new findings" published in that year's volume of Medieval Archaeology. Mary has produced two single-authored books dedicated to child bioarchaeology.

== Selected publications ==
- Lewis, M (2017). Paleopathology of Children. London: Academic Press. ISBN 978-0-12-410402-0.
- Lewis, M (2007). The Bioarchaeology of Children. Cambridge: Cambridge University Press. ISBN 978-0-521-83602-9.
- Dewitte S, Lewis M (2020). "Medieval menarche: changes in pubertal timing before and after the Black Death". American Journal of Human Biology. 33 (2) e23439. doi:10.1002/ajhb.23439. PMID 32567154.
- Lewis M (2016). "Work and the Adolescent in Medieval England (AD 900-1550): the osteological evidence" (PDF). Medieval Archaeology. 60 (1): 138–171. doi:10.1080/00766097.2016.1147787. S2CID 163094707.
- Lewis M, Shapland F, Watts R (2016). "On the threshold of adulthood: A new approach for the use of maturation indicators to assess puberty in adolescents from medieval England" (PDF). American Journal of Human Biology. 28 (1): 48–56. doi:10.1002/ajhb.22761. PMID 26238500. S2CID 26111310.
- Shapland F, Lewis M (2013). "A proposed osteological method for the estimation of pubertal stage in human skeletal remains". American Journal of Physical Anthropology. 151 (2): 302–310. doi:10.1002/ajpa.22268. PMID 23588889.

== Sources ==
- International Journal of Osteoarchaeology editorial board https://onlinelibrary.wiley.com/page/journal/10991212/homepage/editorialboard.html
- American Journal of Physical Anthropology associate editor https://onlinelibrary.wiley.com/doi/pdf/10.1002/ajpa.23096 (but not by 2019?) https://onlinelibrary.wiley.com/page/journal/10968644/homepage/editorialboard.html
- International Journal of Palaeopathology associate editor
