= Ellen Swift =

British archaeologist

Ellen Swift FSA
- Born: 1972 (age 53–54)

Academic background
- Education: University College London

Academic work
- Discipline: Archaeology
- Sub-discipline: Classical archaeology
- Institutions: University of Kent
- Main interests: Roman Britain; Roman North-Western provinces; Roman Egypt; Roman jewellery and dress accessories; Roman and late antique artefacts

Ellen Swift FSA (born 1972) is a British archaeologist and academic. She is Professor of Roman Archaeology at the University of Kent.

== Biography ==
Swift studied at the Institute of Archaeology, University College London for her BA, MA, and PhD. Her doctoral thesis was titled "Regionality in the late Roman West through the study of crossbow brooches, bracelets, beads and belt sets" and was submitted in 1999.

Swift is a specialist in material culture studies of the Roman world, including dress accessories and functional artefacts including dice. She was elected a Fellow of the Society of Antiquaries of London (FSA) in October 2005. In 2001, the Theoretical Roman Archaeology Conference formed a standing committee to oversee the conference, consisting of Swift, Martin Carruthers, Carol van Driel-Murray, Andrew Gardner, Jason Lucas, and Louise Revell. The committee also edited the proceedings for the 2001 conference.

== Publications ==
- Swift, E. (2000). Regionality in Dress Accessories in the Late Roman West. Montagnac: Editions Monique Mergoil.
- Swift, E. (2000). The End of the Western Roman Empire: An Archaeological Investigation. Stroud: Tempus.
- Swift, E. (2003). "Transformation in Meaning: Amber and Glass Beads Across the Roman Frontier", Proceedings of the Twelfth Annual Theoretical Roman Archaeology Conference, Canterbury 2002. 48–57. doi:10.16995/TRAC2002_48_57
- Swift, E. (2003). Roman dress accessories. Princes Risborough: Shire Publications. ISBN 978-0747805670.
- Swift, E. (2009). Style and Function in Roman Decoration: Living with Objects and Interiors. Farnham, Surrey: Ashgate.
- Swift, E. (2017). Roman Artefacts and Society: Design, Behaviour and Experience. Oxford: Oxford University Press.
- Swift, E., Stoner, J. and Pudsey, A. (2022). A Social Archaeology of Roman and Late Antique Egypt. Oxford: Oxford University Press.
- Swift, E. (2024). Rethinking the Date and Interpretation of the Thetford Treasure: a 5th-c. hoard of gold jewelry and silver spoons. Journal of Roman Archaeology 37, 409–448.
