= Theoretical Archaeology Group =

- Abbreviation: TAG (Note: TAG is also used as the Theoretical Archaeology Group's nickname.)
- Formation: TAG Conference: December 1977; 48 years ago TAG National Body: 1979; 47 years ago
- Founder: University of Southampton University of Sheffield
- Founded at: University of Southampton (TAG Conference); University of Sheffield (TAG National Body)
- Purpose: To promote debate and discussion of issues in theoretical archaeology.
- Location: United Kingdom
- Key people: Julian Thomas (TAG Trustee); Karina Croucher (TAG Trustee); Colin Renfrew (Former TAG Trustee); Timothy Darvill (Former TAG Trustee); Andrew Fleming (Former TAG Trustee).
- Website: Antiquity TAG Archive

The Theoretical Archaeology Group (TAG) is an academic national body in the United Kingdom founded in 1979 "to promote debate and discussion of issues in theoretical archaeology". Since 1977 TAG conferences have been held in December at various universities in the UK and Ireland discussing a range of contemporary theoretical approaches in archaeology. The conferences are supported by the journal Antiquity.

Since 1985, regional TAG conferences have also been held in Australia, Europe and North America. The Theoretical Roman Archaeology Conference (TRAC) was created in 1991 to address the shortcomings of traditional Roman archaeology through critical, theory-driven discussions inspired by TAG conferences.

== History ==
In the mid to late 1970s, the teaching of theoretical archaeology was limited in UK universities. The death of English academic and archaeologist David Clarke in 1976 represented a significant blow to the field.

=== The Cambridge Interdisciplinary Conferences ===
In the 1970s, there were several events which engaged in archaeological theory in British archaeology. The first three Cambridge Interdisciplinary Conferences - Archaeology and Anthropology: Areas of Mutual Interest, Social Organisation and Settlement: Contributions from Anthropology, Archaeology and Geography and Space, Hierarchy and Society: Interdisciplinary Studies in Social Area Analysis - held between 1976 and 1978, are considered to be the most notable precursors to the Theoretical Archaeology Group (TAG) events. (Note: This is the view taken by the organisers of the conferences at least.) The first interdisciplinary conference in March 1976 was organised by the Cambridge University Archaeological and Anthropological Societies. Colin Renfrew contributed to these conferences.

=== Theoretical Archaeology Group (TAG) Conferences ===
The idea for TAG came out of a discussion at Southampton in the spring of 1977 between Andrew Fleming and Colin Renfrew. It was agreed that a new discussion group would be created for like-minded archaeology staff and students from the universities of Southampton and Sheffield. TAG began at the University of Southampton in December 1977, with the University of Sheffield hosting the following year. Both conferences were held as seminar-like gatherings and were considered progenitors of the events which followed.

From December 1979, TAG became an annual conference open to all universities, researchers and professionals - the conference was a success. In 1982, the proceedings of the second open conference in Southampton in 1980 were published in the edited volume Theory and Explanation in Archaeology. The volume reflected TAG's expanding international and cross-disciplinary reach and featured European and North American contributors from anthropology, natural sciences, philosophy to sociology. The resulting papers drew mixed reactions from reviewers.

By 1984, TAG sought to actively integrate archaeological theory with practice. Writing in Antiquity ahead of that year's conference at the University of Cambridge, Nick Merriman outlined aims to break down this distinction by bringing together archaeologists, museum staff, field units, and professionals traditionally outside of the discipline.

Since 1985 various regional conferences have been organised in Australia, Europe and North America.

== Conference Format and National Body ==
=== Conference Format ===
TAG is an example of a parallel session conference. The conferences are hosted annually by different archaeology university departments across the UK and Ireland. The number of sessions and speakers have progressively grown over the decades, especially following the Euro-TAG conference at the University of Southampton in 1992.

The conference is known for being affordable, making it accessible to a wide range of participants, including students, early-career researchers and professionals. Past conferences have inspired some of the most innovative journal articles in archaeology, published in respected journals such as Archaeological Dialogues, Antiquity, and the Journal of Social Archaeology. The keynote, wine reception, Antiquity Quiz, TAG Party and the annual TAG National Committee meeting have become annual features of the conference.

=== Theoretical Archaeology Group (TAG) National Body ===
The Theoretical Archaeology Group (TAG) was established as a national body in 1979. The national body comprises two governing entities: a National Committee and Trustees. TAG is managed and guided by a National Committee, which includes representatives from previous TAG conference host departments. The committee meets annually at the conference. The TAG Trustees convene and organise annual National Committee meetings, administer TAG finances and promote the annual conference.

== List of Annual TAG Conferences in the UK and Ireland ==
=== By Conference Year ===
The Theoretical Archaeology Group conferences have been held or are planned at the following institutions:

Year	Host Institution	Theme / Meeting Name	Conference Dates
2026	University of Exeter	Persistence / Loss	14–16 December
2025	University of York	Theory in Action	15–17 December
2024	Bournemouth University	Evolution?	13–15 December
2023	University of East Anglia	Climate Archaeology: Temporalities and Ontologies	18-20 December
2022	University of Edinburgh	Revolutions	15–17 December
2021	Antiquity (Note: Due to the Covid-19 pandemic this conference was held online.)		17–19 December
2020	University of Leicester	Fringe TAG	18 December
2019	University College London	Power, Knowledge and the Past / TAG@UCL-IoA	16–18 December
2018	University of Chester	TAG Deva	17–19 December
2017	Cardiff University		18–20 December
2016	University of Southampton		19–21 December
2015	University of Bradford		14–16 December
2014	University of Manchester		15–17 December
2013	Bournemouth University	TAG on Sea	16–18 December
2012	University of Liverpool		17–19 December
2011	University of Birmingham	Central TAG	14–16 December
2010	University of Bristol		17–19 December
2009	Durham University		17–19 December
2008	University of Southampton		15–17 December
2007	University of York		14–16 December
2006	University of Exeter	X-TAG	15–18 December
2005	University of Sheffield		19–21 December
2004	University of Glasgow	Tartan TAG	17–19 December
2003	University of Wales, Lampeter	TAG@25	17–19 December
2002	University of Manchester		21–23 December
2001	University College Dublin	TAG in Ireland	13–15 December
2000	University of Oxford	TAG 2000	18–20 December
1999	Cardiff University		14–17 December
1998	University of Birmingham		19–21 December
1997	Bournemouth University		16–18 December
1996	University of Liverpool		16–18 December
1995	University of Reading		18–21 December
1994	University of Bradford		14–16 December
1993	Durham University		13–16 December
1992	University of Southampton	Euro-TAG	14–16 December
1991	University of Leicester		16–19 December
1990	University of Wales, Lampeter (Note: This is considered the meeting where post-modernism emerged into archaeological theory.)		17–20 December
1989	Newcastle University		18–20 December
1988	University of Sheffield		13–15 December
1987	University of Bradford		15–17 December
1986	University College London		15–17 December
1985	University of Glasgow		16–18 December
1984	University of Cambridge (Note: This is the first conference to be mentioned in an Antiquity article, by Nick Merriman, other than a book review.)		14–16 December
1983	Cardiff University		12–14 December
1982	Durham University		13–15 December
1981	University of Reading		14–16 December
1980	University of Southampton		14–16 December
1979	University of Sheffield		17–19 December
1978	University of Sheffield		8–10 December
1977	University of Southampton		9–11 December

=== By Host Institution ===
The founding institutions of TAG, the University of Southampton and the University of Sheffield, have hosted the most conferences:

Host Institution	Conference Years	No. of Conferences
University of Southampton	2016, 2008, 1992, 1980, 1977	5
University of Sheffield	2005, 1988, 1979, 1978	4
Bournemouth University	2024, 2013, 1997	3
Cardiff University	2017, 1999, 1983	3
Durham University	2009, 1982, 1993	3
University of Bradford	2015, 1994, 1987	3
University College London	2019, 1986	2
University of Birmingham	2011, 1998	2
University of Glasgow	2004, 1985	2
University of Leicester (Note: Due to the Covid-19 pandemic, Leicester's 2020 conference was held online.)	2020, 1991	2
University of Liverpool	2012, 1996	2
University of Manchester	2014, 2002	2
University of Reading	1995, 1981	2
University of Wales, Lampeter	2003, 1990	2
University of York	2025, 2007	2
University of Exeter	2026, 2006	2
Antiquity	2021	1
Newcastle University	1989	1
University College Dublin	2001	1
University of Bristol	2010	1
University of Cambridge	1984	1
University of Chester	2018	1
University of East Anglia	2023	1
University of Edinburgh	2022	1
University of Oxford	2000	1

== List of regional TAG conferences ==
Since 1985, regional TAG conferences have also been held in Australia, Europe and North America. There are also the SWISS-Tag network (Note: The SWISS-Tag group is based in Bern, Switzerland.) and the TAG Germany groups. (Note: The TAG Germany group organises workshops, conferences, and meetings each year, and contributes panels and sessions to the annual conferences of the German Archaeological Associations.)

Year	Host Institution(s) / City / Town	Organiser	Country	Conference dates
2026	City University of New York	TAG North America	United States	29-31 May
2026	Pratt Institute	TAG North America	United States	29-31 May
2026	Adelaide University	The Australian Theoretical Archaeological Group (AusTAG)	Australia	22-23 May
2026	Kalmar	Nordic TAG	Sweden	6–9 May
2026	Évora	TAG Ibérico	Portugal	5-7 February
2025	College of William & Mary	TAG North America	United States	9–11 May
2024	Santa Fe University of Art and Design	TAG North America	United States	21–23 May
2024	Segovia	TAG Ibérico	Spain	8-10 February
2024	Turku	Nordic TAG	Finland	6–9 March
2023	Bratislava	TAG Central Europe	Slovakia	9-10 November
2022	Oslo	Nordic TAG	Norway	
2021	TAG-Turkey III	TAG Turkey	Turkey	6–9 May
2021	Stanford University	TAG North America	United States	
2020	University of Lisbon	TAG Ibérico	Portugal	15 February
2019	Syracuse University	TAG North America	United States	
2018	University of Florida	TAG North America	United States	
2018	Carmona	TAG Ibérico	Spain	3–4 February
2017	University of Toronto	TAG North America	Canada	18–20 May
2016	Süleyman Demirel University	TAG Turkey	Turkey	
2016	Terrigal	Aus-TAG session	Australia	6–8 December
2016	Bratislava	TAG Central Europe	Slovakia	8-9 November
2016	University of Colorado Boulder	TAG North America	United States	22–24 May
2015	Copenhagen	Nordic TAG	Denmark	
2015	New York University	TAG North America	United States	
2015	Charles University	TAG Central Europe	Czech Republic	12 May
2015	Academy of Sciences of the Czech Republic	TAG Central Europe	Czech Republic	12 May
2014	Mimar Sinan University	TAG Turkey	Turkey	5–6 February 2015
2014	University of Illinois Urbana-Champaign	TAG North America	United States	23–25 May
2014	Stockholm	Nordic TAG	Sweden	22–26 April
2014	University of West Bohemia	TAG Central Europe	Czech Republic	3–4 March
2013	Ege University	TAG Turkey	Turkey	9–11 May
2013	University of Chicago	TAG North America	United States	9–10 May
2013	Reykjavík	Nordic TAG	Iceland	21–25 April
2012	University of Glasgow	Scottish TAG	Scotland	6 October
2012	Oulu	Nordic TAG	Finland	
2012	University at Buffalo	TAG North America	United States	27–30 May
2011	University of California, Berkeley	TAG North America	United States	6–8 May
2011	Kalmar	Nordic TAG	Sweden	26–29 April
2010	Brown University	TAG North America	United States	30 April – 2 May
2011	Stanford University	TAG North America	United States	1–3 May
2009	Trondheim	Nordic TAG	Norway	26–29 May
2008	Columbia University	TAG North America	United States	23–25 May
2007	Aarhus	Nordic TAG	Denmark	
2005	Lund	Nordic TAG	Sweden	
2003	Uppsala	Nordic TAG	Sweden	
2001	Oslo	Nordic TAG	Norway	
1997	Gothenburg	Nordic TAG	Sweden	
1992	Helsinki	Nordic TAG	Finland	
1990	Bergen	Nordic TAG	Norway	
1987	Umeå	Nordic TAG	Sweden	
1985	Elsinore	Nordic TAG	Denmark	
