= Carol van Driel-Murray =

Roman archaeologist (born 1950)

- Born: May 20, 1950 (age 76); Isleworth, United Kingdom
- Occupations: Archaeologist; Lecturer

Academic background
- Education: University of Liverpool
- Thesis: Studies in Leatherwork from Roman Archaeological Sites in North-Western Europe (1987)

Academic work
- Discipline: Archaeology
- Sub-discipline: Roman archaeology
- Institutions: University of Amsterdam; University of Leiden

Carol van Driel-Murray (born 20 May 1950) is a Roman archaeologist who specialises in the role of women and studying leather. After studying at the University of Liverpool, van Driel-Murray worked at the University of Amsterdam for 37 years and the University of Leiden for three before she retired in 2015.

== Early life ==
Carol was born on 20 May 1950 in Isleworth. She completed a degree in archaeology at the University of Liverpool in 1971. Four years later, she moved to the Netherlands and married Govert van Driel.

== Career ==
In 1975, Carol van Driel-Murray joined the University of Amsterdam as a researcher, and was promoted to lecturer in 1982. While teaching at the, van Direl-Murray completed a doctorate at the same university, and was awarded a PhD in 1987. The work examined leather from Roman sites.

She organised the Roman Military Equipment Conference twice (1987 and 1994) and edited the conference proceedings. She also regularly participated in the Theoretical Roman Archaeology Conference, and at the 1992 edition she delivered an influential paper which explored the topic of gender in Roman archaeology. The editor of the conference proceedings noted that, along with Lindsay Allason-Jones' contribution, the paper "provide[d] important examples of how assumptions have become embedded within Roman archaeology and have taken on the appearance of fact." In 2001, TRAC formed a standing committee to oversee the conference, consisting of van Driel-Murray, Martin Carruthers, Andrew Gardner, Jason Lucas, Louise Revell, and Ellen Swift. The committee also edited the proceedings for the 2001 conference.

van Driel-Murrary joined the University of Leiden in 2012 and retired in 2015.

In 2018, Oxbow Books published a festschrift dedicated to van Driel-Murray, edited by Tatiana Ivlevla, Jasper de Bruin, and Mark Driessen.
