= Andrew Gardner (archaeologist) =

Andrew Gardner FSA
- Born: 1973 (age 52–53)

Academic background
- Education: UCL Institute of Archaeology

Academic work
- Institutions: UCL Institute of Archaeology; University of Leicester; University of Reading; Cardiff University

Andrew Niall Gardner (born 1973) is a British archaeologist and academic, working in the areas of Roman archaeology and archaeological theory. He is Professor of the Archaeology of the Roman Empire at the UCL Institute of Archaeology.

== Early life and education ==
Gardner studied for a BA and MA in Archaeology at UCL. He completed a PhD in 2001 at the UCL Institute of Archaeology. His doctoral thesis was titled "'Military' and 'civilian' in late Roman Britain: An archaeology of social identity", and his supervisors were Mark Hassall, Stephen Shennan, Richard Reece, and Jeremy Tanner.

== Academic career ==
From 2003 to 2004, Gardiner worked at the University of Leicester and at the School of Continuing Education, University of Reading. Then, from 2004 to 2005, he was a lecturer in Roman archaeology at Cardiff University. Since 2005, he has been a lecturer in archaeology at the Institute of Archaeology. His recent work has drawn on Border Studies to consider frontiers in Roman Britain. Gardner is the editor of Britannia.

He was elected as a Fellow of the Society of Antiquaries of London (FSA) on 17 November 2011.

Gardner served as co-Chair of University Archaeology UK from 2022 to 2025. He has had a long-standing involvement with the Theoretical Roman Archaeology Conference (TRAC) and is a member of the Advisory Committee. In 2001, TRAC formed a standing committee to oversee the conference, consisting of Gardner, Martin Carruthers, Carol van Driel-Murray, Jason Lucas, Louise Revell, and Ellen Swift. The committee also edited the proceedings for the 2001 conference.

== Selected publications ==
- Gardner, A 2002. Social identity and the duality of structure in late Roman-period Britain. Journal of Social Archaeology 2(3): 323-351.
- Gardner, A. 2007. An Archaeology of Identity: soldiers and society in late Roman Britain. Left Coast Press.
- Gardner, A. 2012. Time and empire in the Roman world. Journal of Social Archaeology 12(2), 145-166.
- Gardner, A. 2013. Thinking about Roman imperialism: postcolonialism, globalisation and beyond? Britannia 44: 1-25.
- Gardner, A. 2017. Brexit, boundaries and imperial identities: A comparative view. Journal of Social Archaeology 17(1), 3-26.
