= Charlotte Roberts =

British archaeologist, academic and former nurse

Charlotte Roberts FBA
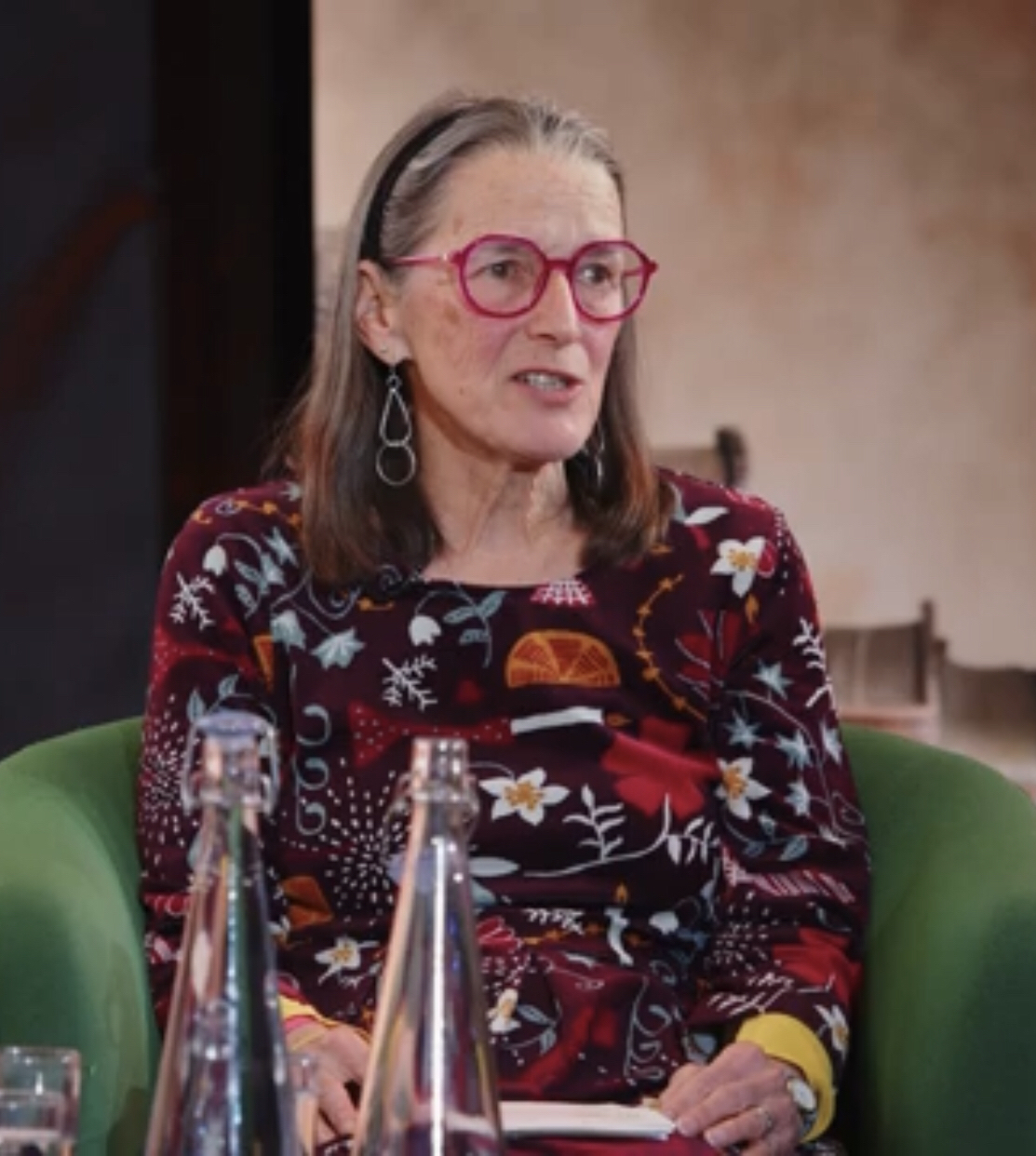
- Roberts at the British Library in 2024
- Born: Charlotte Ann Roberts; 25 June 1957 (age 69); Harrogate, West Riding of Yorkshire, England
- Title: Professor of Archaeology

Academic background
- Education: University of Leicester; University of Sheffield; University of Bradford
- Thesis: Trauma and its treatment in British antiquity: An osteoarchaeological study of macroscopic and radiological features of long bone fractures from the historic period with a comparative study of clinical radiographs (1988)

Academic work
- Discipline: Archaeology
- Sub-discipline: Bioarchaeology; Palaeopathology; Medical history Medical anthropology
- Institutions: University of Bradford; Durham University
- Doctoral students: Mary Lewis

Charlotte Ann Roberts, FBA (born 25 May 1957) is a British archaeologist, academic and former nurse. She is a bioarchaeologist and palaeopathologist, whose research focuses on health and the evolution of infectious disease in humans. From 2004 to 2020, she was Professor of Archaeology at Durham University: she is now professor emeritus.

== Early life and education ==
Roberts was born on 25 May 1957 in Harrogate, West Riding of Yorkshire, England. She trained as a nurse at St James's University Hospital in Leeds, becoming a State Registered Nurse (SRN) in 1978. She then worked as a staff nurse on the burns unit of St Lawrence Hospital, Chepstow.

In 1979, Roberts left her nursing career and matriculated into the University of Leicester to study archaeology. She graduated in 1982 with a Bachelor of Arts (BA Hons) degree. She had originally intended to return to nursing after completing her degree, but instead continued to study archaeology. From 1982 to 1983, she studied environmental archaeology and palaeoeconomy at the University of Sheffield, graduating with a Master of Arts (MA) degree. She undertook postgraduate research in bioarchaeology, palaeopathology and medical history on a part-time basis at the University of Bradford, and completed her Doctor of Philosophy (PhD) degree in 1988. Her doctoral thesis was titled "Trauma and its treatment in British antiquity: An osteoarchaeological study of macroscopic and radiological features of long bone fractures from the historic period with a comparative study of clinical radiographs".

== Academic career ==
From 1983 to 1988, Roberts was a research assistant at the University of Bradford "on a project focusing on human remains". She was appointed a lecturer in palaeopathology in 1989 and made a senior lecturer in medical anthropology in 1994. While at Bradford, she supervised Mary Lewis' doctoral thesis. In 2000, she moved to Durham University where she had been appointed Reader in Archaeology. She was appointed Professor of Archaeology in 2004. She was also a Leverhulme Trust Senior Research Fellow from 2006 to 2008, and a Nuffield Foundation Research Fellow from 2006 to 2007. She retired in October 2020, and was appointed professor emeritus.

Roberts is deputy editor of the International Journal of Paleopathology. She was president of the Paleopathology Association from 2011 to 2013. From 2010 to 2014, she served as a member of the Geography, Environmental Studies and Archaeology sub-panel for the Research Excellence Framework (REF 2014). In 2015, she was elected president of the British Association of Biological Anthropology and Osteoarchaeology (BABAO); she will serve a three-year term.

She led the research on the 7th and 8th century Bowl Hole cemetery at Bamburgh Castle.

== Personal life ==
In 2003, Roberts married Stewart James Gardner. She is a member of the Women's Institute (WI).

== Honours ==
In July 2014, Roberts was elected a Fellow of the British Academy, the UK's national academy for the humanities and the social sciences.

== Selected works ==
- Roberts, Charlotte A.; Lee, Frances; Bintliff, John, eds. (1989). Burial archaeology: current research, methods, and developments. Oxford: British Archaeological Reports. ISBN 978-0-86054-671-9.
- Hunter, John; Roberts, Charlotte; Martin, Anthony (1996). Studies in crime: an introduction to forensic archaeology. London: Batsford. ISBN 978-0-7134-7901-0.
- Roberts, Charlotte; Manchester, Keith (1997). The Archaeology of Disease (2nd ed.). Stroud: Alan Sutton. ISBN 978-0-7509-1483-3.
- Roberts, Charlotte; Cox, Margaret (2003). Health and disease in Britain: from prehistory to the present day. Stroud: Sutton. ISBN 978-0-7509-1844-2.
- Roberts, Charlotte A.; Buikstra, Jane E. (2003). The bioarchaeology of tuberculosis: a global view on a reemerging disease. Gainesville: University Press of Florida. ISBN 978-0-8130-2643-5.
- Roberts, Charlotte; Manchester, Keith (2005). The Archaeology of Disease (3rd ed.). Stroud: Sutton. ISBN 978-0-7509-2683-6.
- Roberts, Charlotte A. (2009). Human remains in archaeology: a handbook. York: Council for British Archaeology. ISBN 978-1-902771-75-5.
- Buikstra, Jane E.; Roberts, Charlotte A., eds. (2012). The global history of paleopathology: pioneers and prospects. Oxford: Oxford University Press. ISBN 978-0-19-538980-7.
