= Soldiers: A History of Men in Battle =

- Presented by: Frederick Forsyth
- Country of origin: United Kingdom
- Original language: English
- No. of seasons: 1
- No. of episodes: 13

Original release
- Network: BBC
- Release: 18 September – 18 December 1985

Soldiers: A History of Men in Battle is a 1985 BBC television documentary series about the history of warfare from antiquity to the Falklands War. Each episode looks at warfare from the perspective of different participants: infantryman, artillerist, cavalryman, tanker, airman, guerrilla, surgeon, logistician and commander. The series and a companion book were written by John Keegan and Richard Holmes, and the series was presented by Frederick Forsyth.

== Episodes ==
- 1 – "The Face of Battle" (18 September 1985)
- 2 – "Cavalry" (25 September 1985)
- 3 – "Gunner" (2 October 1985)
- 4 – "Fighting Spirit" (9 October 1985)
- 5 – "Infantry" (23 October 1985)
- 6 – "Tank" (30 October 1985)
- 7 – "Air Power" (6 November 1985)
- 8 – "Sapper" (13 November 1985)
- 9 – "Casualty" (20 November 1985)
- 10 – "Sinews of War" (27 November 1985)
- 11 – "Commander" (4 December 1985)
- 12 – "Irregular" (11 December 1985)
- 13 – "Experience of War" (18 December 1985)
