= Christopher Chippindale =

British archaeologist

Christopher Chippindale FSA
- Born: 13 October 1951 (age 74)
- Citizenship: United Kingdom
- Spouse: Anne (m. 1976–2008)
- Partner: Justice Oleka (civil partnership 2008)

Academic background
- Education: St John's College, Cambridge; Girton College, Cambridge

Academic work
- Discipline: Archaeology
- Sub-discipline: Prehistory; Stonehenge; rock art
- Institutions: Girton College, Cambridge; Museum of Archaeology and Anthropology, University of Cambridge

Christopher Ralph Chippindale, FSA (born 13 October 1951) is a British archaeologist. He worked at the Museum of Archaeology and Anthropology from 1988 to his retirement in 2013, and was additionally Reader in Archaeology at the University of Cambridge from 2001 to 2013.

== Early life and education ==
Chippindale was born on 13 October 1951, to Keith and Ruth Chippindale. He was educated at Sedbergh School, a public school in Sedbergh, Yorkshire. He went on to study at St John's College, Cambridge, graduating Bachelor of Arts (BA Hons). He then studied for a Doctor of Philosophy (PhD) at Girton College, Cambridge. His doctoral thesis was titled, "The Later Prehistoric rock-engravings of Val Fontanalba, Mont Bego, Tende, Alpes-Maritimes, France" and was completed in 1988.

== Career ==
Chippindale was a research fellow in archaeology at Girton College, Cambridge from 1985 to 1988 and bye-fellow from 1988 to 1991. In 1987, he was appointed assistant curator of the Museum of Archaeology and Anthropology, University of Cambridge. He was promoted to Senior Assistant Curator in 1993. In 2001, he was appointed reader in archaeology at the University of Cambridge. He concurrently held the positions of reader and curator for British archaeology at the museum. He retired in 2013, and is now reader emeritus at the university and a senior fellow of the McDonald Institute for Archaeological Research.

Outside of his university career, he served as editor of the academic journal Antiquity for ten years, from 1987 to 1997.

== Personal life ==
In 1976, Chippindale married Anne Lowe. Together they had four children; two sons and two daughters. They divorced in 2008. In 2008, he entered into a civil partnership with Justice Oleka. His brother Peter Chippindale was a journalist and author.

== Honours ==
On 10 January 1991, Chippindale was elected Fellow of the Society of Antiquaries of London (FSA).

== Works ==
His publications include:

- Stonehenge Complete (first published 1983 ISBN 0-500-05043-0, 4th edition 2012)
- with Paul Devereux, Peter Fowler, Rhys Jones, and Tim Sebastian: Who Owns Stonehenge? (1990) ISBN 0-7134-6455-0
- as editor with Paul S. Taçon: The Archaeology of Rock Art (1998)
- Nash, George; Chippindale, Christopher, eds. (2002). European landscapes of rock-art. London: Routledge. ISBN 9780415257350.
  - Chippindale, Christopher; Nash, George (2 September 2003). 2003 pbk edition. Routledge. ISBN 0415257352.

Academic offices
| Preceded by Glyn Daniel | Editor of Antiquity; 1987–1997 | Succeeded by Caroline Malone |
