= Lynn Meskell =

Australian-born archaeologist and anthropologist

- Born: 1967 (age 58–59)

Academic background
- Education: University of Sydney (BA); University of Cambridge (PhD)

Academic work
- Discipline: Archaeology; Anthropology
- Institutions: University of Pennsylvania; Stanford University; Columbia University; Oxford University; University of Cambridge; University of Sydney
- Main interests: Archaeological Theory, Archaeological ethnography, UNESCO World Heritage, Heritage ethics, Egyptian archaeology, Çatalhöyük, Gender studies, Postcolonial theory, Feminist theory

Lynn Meskell (born 1967) is an Australian archaeologist and anthropologist who currently works as a professor at the University of Pennsylvania.

She has worked as the 26th Penn Integrates Knowledge Program (PIK) Professor since her appointment in 2020, which is a program appointed to faculty with multidisciplinary research and teaching and who are working in at least two Penn Schools.

Meskell is also the Richard D. Green Professor of Anthropology in the School of Arts and Sciences, Graduate Professor of Historic Preservation in the Weitzman School of Design, and a curator for the Penn Museum's Middle East and Asia areas.

Since 2019 she has been an Andrew D. White Professor-at-Large at Cornell University; her term expires in 2026.

== Education ==
Meskell received her BA from the University of Sydney in 1994 (First Class) and University Medal. She was awarded the King's College scholarship from the University of Cambridge for her PhD in archaeology (1994–1997). In her doctoral dissertation, Meskell analyzed data from the settlement and cemeteries of Deir el-Medina, a New Kingdom worker's village across the Nile River from Luxor.

== Career ==
From 1997 to 1999, she held the Salvesen Junior Research Fellowship at New College, University of Oxford before accepting a position in the Anthropology Department at Columbia University in New York City where she taught till 2005 as associate professor, and then Professor. In 2005, she moved to Stanford University, where she taught in the Department of Anthropology from 2005 to 2020. From 2019 to 2020, she was the Shirley and Leonard Ely Professor of Humanities and Sciences in the Department of Anthropology at Stanford University. She was the Director of the Stanford Archaeology Center from 2010 to 2016.

Since 2020, Meskell has been a professor in the College of Arts and Sciences and the Weitzman School of Design, and a Penn Museum curator for the Middle East and Asia.

In 2002, she was a National Endowment for the Humanities Fellow at the School for Advanced Research in Santa Fe. Meskell received the Andrew W. Mellon Foundation's New Directions Fellowship in 2004, supporting training in ethnography and African studies to prepare her for work in South Africa. She carried out fieldwork in the Kruger National Park and Mapungubwe National Park.

== Research ==
Meskell's interests include socio-politics, archaeological ethics, global heritage, materiality, as well as feminist and postcolonial theory. She is recognized for her contributions to feminist archaeology, archaeological ethics, and issues of heritage. Her earlier research examined social life in the New Kingdom of Egypt, natural and cultural heritage in South Africa, and the archaeology of figurines and burial at the Neolithic site of Çatalhöyük, Turkey.

Meskell conducted an institutional ethnography of UNESCO World Heritage, criticizing the World Heritage Program through her research. She traced the politics of governance and sovereignty and the subsequent implications for multilateral diplomacy, international conservation, and heritage rights. Employing archival and ethnographic analysis, she has revealed UNESCO's early forays into a one-world archaeology and its later commitments to global heritage.

In other fieldwork across India she explores monumental regimes of research and preservation around World Heritage sites and how diverse actors and agencies address the needs of living communities. In 2016, she was invited to India through the Global Initiative of Academic Networks (GIAN) program.

Meskell founded the Journal of Social Archaeology, releasing its first publication in June 2001.

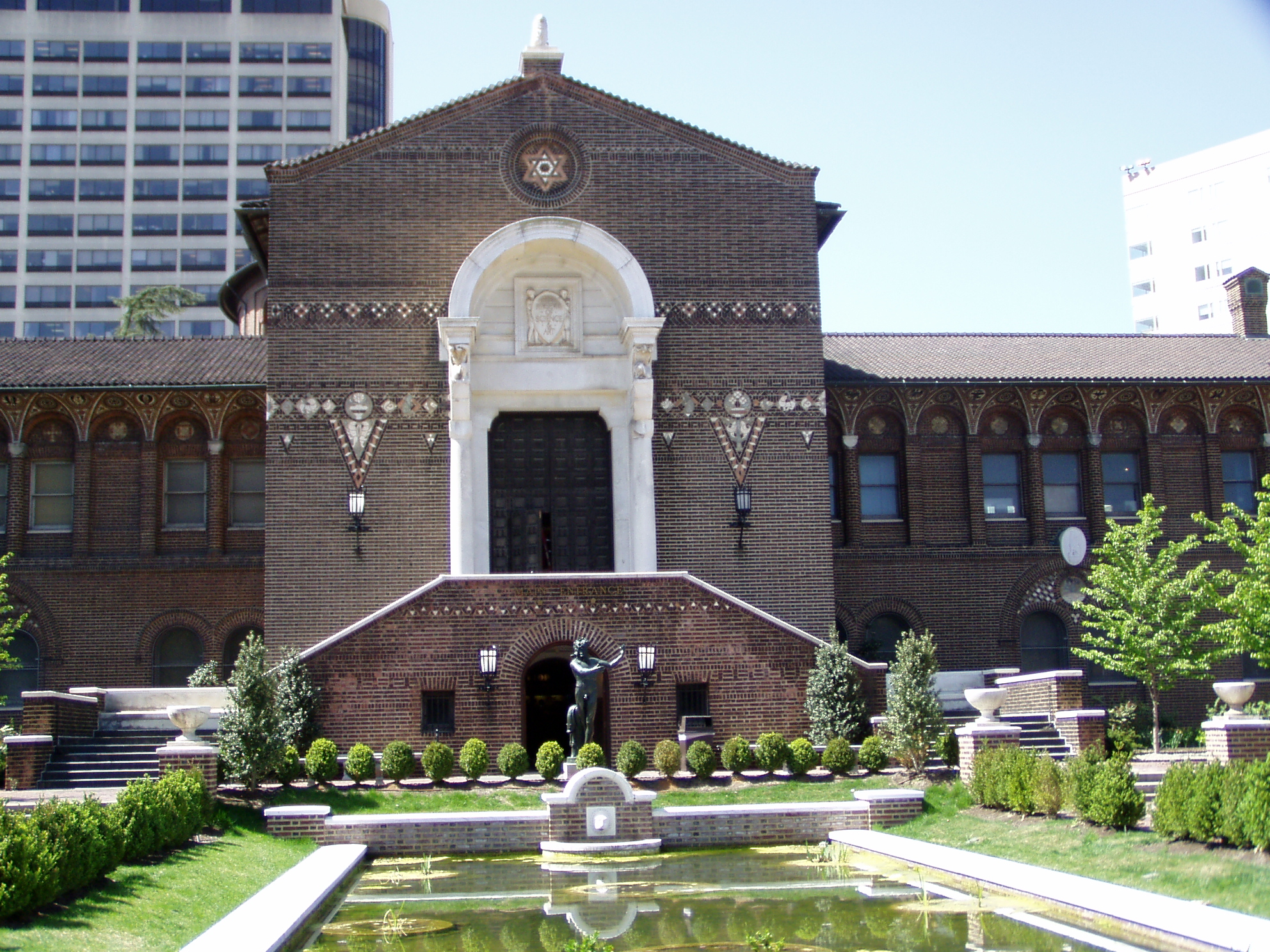
University of Pennsylvania Museum of Archaeology and Anthropology

== Awards and honors ==
Meskell is an Honorary Professor in the School of Geography, Archaeology and Environmental Studies at the University of the Witwatersrand, South Africa, and in the Center for Archaeology, Heritage & Museum Studies, Shiv Nadar University, India. She is also Honorary Professor at Oxford University and Liverpool University in the UK.

She has been awarded grants and fellowships for over 20 years from various institutions, including from the Andrew W. Mellon Foundation, the National Science Foundation, the Australian Research Council, the American Academy in Rome, the School of American Research, Oxford University and Cambridge University.

In 2017, Meskell was elected Fellow of the Australian Academy of the Humanities. That same year, she received an Honorary Doctorate from the American University of Rome, Italy.

In 2024, she was awarded an Honorary Doctorate (doctor honoris causa) from the University of Bergen, Norway and in 2025 she was elected a Fellow of the British Academy.

== Books ==
- ———, ed. (2002). Archaeology Under Fire: Nationalism, Politics and Heritage in the Eastern Mediterranean and Middle East. Routledge. ISBN 9781134643905.
- Archaeologies of Social Life: Age, Sex, Class Etc. in Ancient Egypt. Oxford: Wiley. 1999. ISBN 9780631212997.
- Private Life in New Kingdom Egypt. Princeton University Press. 2002. ISBN 9780691120584.
- ———; Joyce, Rosemary A. (2014). Embodied Lives: Figuring Ancient Maya and Egyptian Experience. London: Routledge. ISBN 9781315787787.
- ———; Preucel, Robert W., eds. (2004). A Companion to Social Archaeology. Oxford: Blackwell. ISBN 9780631225782.
- Object Worlds in Ancient Egypt: Material Biographies Past and Present. Oxford: Berg. 2004. ISBN 9781859738672.
- ———; Pels, Peter, eds. (2005). Embedding Ethics. Oxford: Berg. ISBN 9781845200473.
- ———, ed. (2005). Archaeologies of Materiality. Oxford: Blackwell. ISBN 9781405136174.
- ———, ed. (2009). Cosmopolitan Archaeologies. Durham, NC: Duke University Press. ISBN 9780822344322.
- The Nature of Heritage: The New South Africa. Oxford: Blackwell. 2011. ISBN 9780470670729.
- Global Heritage: A Reader. Oxford: Blackwell. 2015. ISBN 9781118768860.
- A Future in Ruins: UNESCO, World Heritage and the Dream of Peace. New York City: Oxford University Press. 2018. ISBN 9780190648343.
