= Antiquity (journal) =

Academic journal

- Discipline: Archaeology
- Language: English
- Edited by: Robin Skeates

Publication details
- History: 1927–present
- Publisher: Cambridge University Press (United Kingdom)
- Frequency: Bimonthly
- Open access: Hybrid
- License: CC BY 4.0
- Impact factor: 1.9 (2023)

Standard abbreviations
- ISO 4: Antiquity

Indexing
- ISSN: 0003-598X (print); 1745-1744 (web)
- OCLC no.: 228771606

Links
- Journal homepage; Online access

Antiquity is a bimonthly peer-reviewed academic journal covering archaeology worldwide from all periods. The editor-in-chief is Robin Skeates (University of Durham). Since 2015, the journal has been published by Cambridge University Press.

The journal was established in 1927 by the British archaeologist O. G. S. Crawford and originally called Antiquity: A Quarterly Review of Archaeology. The journal is owned by the Antiquity Trust, a registered charity.

Antiquity has been a long-time supporter of the Theoretical Archaeology Group conferences.

== Open Access adoption ==
Since late 2024, Antiquity has slowly adopted a hybrid open access model.

In October 2024, it was announced that the journal would transition to a full open access model for all research articles by 2026, with a funding initiative ensuring accessibility for all authors.

In April 2026, Cambridge University Press announced that all Antiquity research articles accepted for publication from 1 June 2026 would be freely available to read online via open access and subject to a Creative Commons licence.

== Prizes ==
Two prizes are awarded each year by the Antiquity Trust for research articles published in the journal.

The Antiquity Prize was founded in 1994 by then editor, Christopher Chippindale, and the Antiquity Editorial Board to honour and support the author(s) of the best contribution to each volume of Antiquity.

The Ben Cullen Prize was founded by Ian Gollop in 1996, in honour of Ben Cullen (1964 – 1995), a promising young archaeologist when he died unexpectedly.

== Editors-in-chief ==
The following persons are or have been editor-in-chief:

Editor	Tenure	
O. G. S. Crawford	1927	1957
Glyn Daniel	1958	1986
Christopher Chippindale	1987	1997
Caroline Malone	1998	2002
Martin Carver	2003	2012
Chris Scarre	2013	2017
Robert Witcher	2018	2024
Robin Skeates	2025	present
