= John Keegan =

English military historian (1934–2012)

Sir John Keegan OBE FRSL
- Keegan in 1993
- Born: John Desmond Patrick Keegan; 15 May 1934; Clapham, London, England
- Died: 2 August 2012 (aged 78); Kilmington, Wiltshire, England

Academic background
- Education: Balliol College, Oxford

Academic work
- Main interests: Military history, history of warfare, First World War
- Notable works: The Face of Battle, Soldiers: A History of Men in Battle, The Mask of Command and other major works

Sir John Desmond Patrick Keegan (15 May 1934 – 2 August 2012) was an English military historian, lecturer, author and journalist. He wrote many published works on the nature of combat between prehistory and the 21st century, covering land, air, maritime, intelligence warfare and the psychology of battle.

== Life and career ==
John Desmond Patrick Keegan was born in Clapham, London, on 15 May 1934. His father was an Irish First World War veteran. Keegan was evacuated to Somerset when the Second World War broke out. At age 13 Keegan contracted orthopaedic tuberculosis, which affected his gait. The long-term effects of this rendered him unfit for military service, and the timing of his birth made him too young for service in the war, facts he mentioned in his works as an ironic observation on his profession and interests. The illness also interrupted his education in his teenage years.

He studied for a period at King's College, Taunton, and for two years at Wimbledon College, which led to entry to Balliol College, Oxford, in 1953, where he read history with an emphasis on war theory. After graduation he worked at the American Embassy in London for three years.

In 1960 Keegan took up a lectureship in military history at the Royal Military Academy Sandhurst, which trains officers for the British Army. He remained there for 26 years, becoming a senior lecturer in military history during his tenure, during which he also held a visiting professorship at Princeton University and was Delmas Distinguished Professor of History at Vassar College in the United States.

Leaving the academy in 1986, Keegan joined The Daily Telegraph as a defence correspondent and stayed with the paper as defence editor until his death. He also wrote for the American conservative publication National Review Online. In 1998 he wrote and presented the BBC's Reith Lectures, entitling them "War in Our World".

Keegan died on 2 August 2012 of natural causes at his home in Kilmington, Wiltshire. He was survived by his wife, their two daughters and two sons.

== Published work ==
In A History of Warfare, Keegan outlined the development and limitations of warfare from prehistory to the modern era. It looked at various topics, including the use of horses, logistics, and "fire". A key concept put forward was that war is inherently cultural. In the introduction, he vigorously denounced the notion that war is a reasonable tool of statecraft, "simply a continuation of [interstate] politics by other means", rejecting "Clausewitzian" ideas. However, Keegan's discussion of Clausewitz was criticised as uninformed and inaccurate by writers like Peter Paret, Christopher Bassford, and Richard M. Swain.

Other books written by Keegan are: The Iraq War, Intelligence in War, The First World War, The Second World War, The Battle for History, The Face of Battle, War and Our World, The Mask of Command, and Fields of Battle.

He also contributed to work on historiography in modern conflict. With Richard Holmes he wrote the BBC documentary Soldiers: A History of Men in Battle. Frank C. Mahncke wrote that Keegan is seen as "among the most prominent and widely read military historians of the late twentieth century". In a book-cover blurb extracted from a more complex article, Sir Michael Howard wrote, "at once the most readable and the most original of living historians".

== Views on contemporary conflicts ==
- Keegan stated: "I will never oppose the Vietnam War. Americans were right to do it. I think they fought it in the wrong way. I don't think it's a war like fighting Hitler, but I think it was a right war, a correct war."
- Keegan believed that the NATO bombing of Yugoslavia in 1999 showed that air power alone could win wars.
- An article in The Christian Science Monitor called Keegan a "staunch supporter" of the Iraq War. It quotes him: "Uncomfortable as the 'spectacle of raw military force' is, he concludes that the Iraq war represents 'a better guide to what needs to be done to secure the safety of our world than any amount of law-making or treaty-writing can offer.'"

== Criticism ==
Keegan was criticised by peers, including Sir Michael Howard and Christopher Bassford for his critical position on Carl von Clausewitz, a Prussian officer and author of Vom Kriege (On War), one of the basic texts on warfare and military strategy. Describing Keegan as "profoundly mistaken", Bassford stated, "Nothing anywhere in Keegan's work – despite his many diatribes about Clausewitz and 'the Clausewitzians' – reflects any reading whatsoever of Clausewitz's own writings." The political scientist Richard Betts criticised Keegan's understanding of the political dimensions of war, calling Keegan "a naïf about politics."

Detlef Siebert, a television documentarian, disagreed with Keegan's view that the deliberate targeting of civilian populations by aerial bombing "descended to the enemy's level", although he did call it a "moral blemish".

== Honours ==
On 29 June 1991, as a war correspondent for The Daily Telegraph, Keegan was appointed Officer of the Order of the British Empire (OBE) "in recognition of service within the operations in the Gulf". In the 2000 New Year Honours, he was knighted "for services to Military History".

He was elected a Fellow of the Royal Society of Literature (FRSL) in 1986. In 1993 he won the Duff Cooper Prize.

In 1996 he was awarded the Samuel Eliot Morison Prize for lifetime achievement by the Society for Military History.

The University of Bath awarded him an Honorary Doctor of Letters (DLitt) in 2002.

== Works ==
External videos
- Booknotes interview with Keegan on A History of Warfare, May 8, 1994, C-SPAN
- Presentation by Keegan on Fields of Battle, June 5, 1996, C-SPAN
- Presentation by Keegan on The First World War, June 15, 1999, C-SPAN

- Waffen SS: The Asphalt Soldiers (New York: Ballantine, 1970) ISBN 0-345-32641-5
- Barbarossa: Invasion of Russia, 1941 (New York, 1971) ISBN 0-345-02111-8
- Opening Moves: August 1914 (New York: Ballantine, 1971) ISBN 0-345-09798-X
- Guderian (New York: Ballantine, 1973) ISBN 0-345-03385-X
- Rundstedt (New York: Ballantine, 1974) ISBN 0-345-23790-0
- Dien Bien Phu (New York: Ballantine, 1974) ISBN 0-345-24064-2
- The Face of Battle (London, 1976) ISBN 0-670-30432-8
- Who Was Who in World War II (1978) ISBN 0-85368-182-1
- The Nature of War with Joseph Darracott (New York: Holt, Rinehart and Winston, 1981) ISBN 0-03-057777-2
- Six Armies in Normandy (1982) ISBN 0-14-005293-3
- Zones of Conflict: An Atlas of Future Wars with Andrew Wheatcroft (New York, 1986) ISBN 0-671-60115-6
- Soldiers: A History of Men in Battle with Richard Holmes (New York: Viking Press, 1986) ISBN 0-670-80969-1
- The Mask of Command (London, 1987) ISBN 0-7126-6526-9
- The Price of Admiralty (1988) ISBN 0-09-173771-0
- The Illustrated Face of Battle (New York and London: Viking, 1988) ISBN 0-670-82703-7
- The Second World War (Viking Press, 1989) ISBN 0-670-82359-7
- Churchill's Generals (Weidenfeld & Nicolson, 1991) editor
- A History of Warfare (London, 1993) ISBN 0-679-73082-6
- The Battle for History: Refighting World War Two (Vintage Canada, 1995) ISBN 0-679-76743-6
- Warpaths (Pimlico, 1996) ISBN 1-84413-750-3
- Fields of Battle: The Wars for North America (1997) ISBN 0-679-74664-1
- War and Our World: The Reith Lectures 1998 (London: Pimlico, 1999) ISBN 0-375-70520-1
- The Book of War (ed.; Viking Press, 1999) ISBN 0-670-88804-4
- The First World War (London: Hutchinson, 1998) ISBN 0-09-180178-8; (New York: Knopf, 1999) ISBN 0-375-40052-4
- An Illustrated History of the First World War (Alfred A. Knopf, 2001) ISBN 0-375-41259-X
- Winston Churchill (2002) ISBN 0-670-03079-1
- Intelligence in War: Knowledge of the Enemy from Napoleon to Al-Qaeda (2003) ISBN 0-375-40053-2 (also published with alternative subtitle as Intelligence in War: The Value—and Limitations—of What the Military Can Learn About the Enemy ISBN 0-375-70046-3)
- The Iraq War (2004) ISBN 0-09-180018-8
- Atlas of World War II (ed.; London: Collins, 2006) ISBN 0-00-721465-0 (an update of the 1989 Times Atlas)
- The American Civil War (London, Hutchinson, 2009) ISBN 978-0-09-179483-5
