= Philippa Walton (archaeologist) =

Numismatist and archaeologist

Philippa Walton FSA FHEA
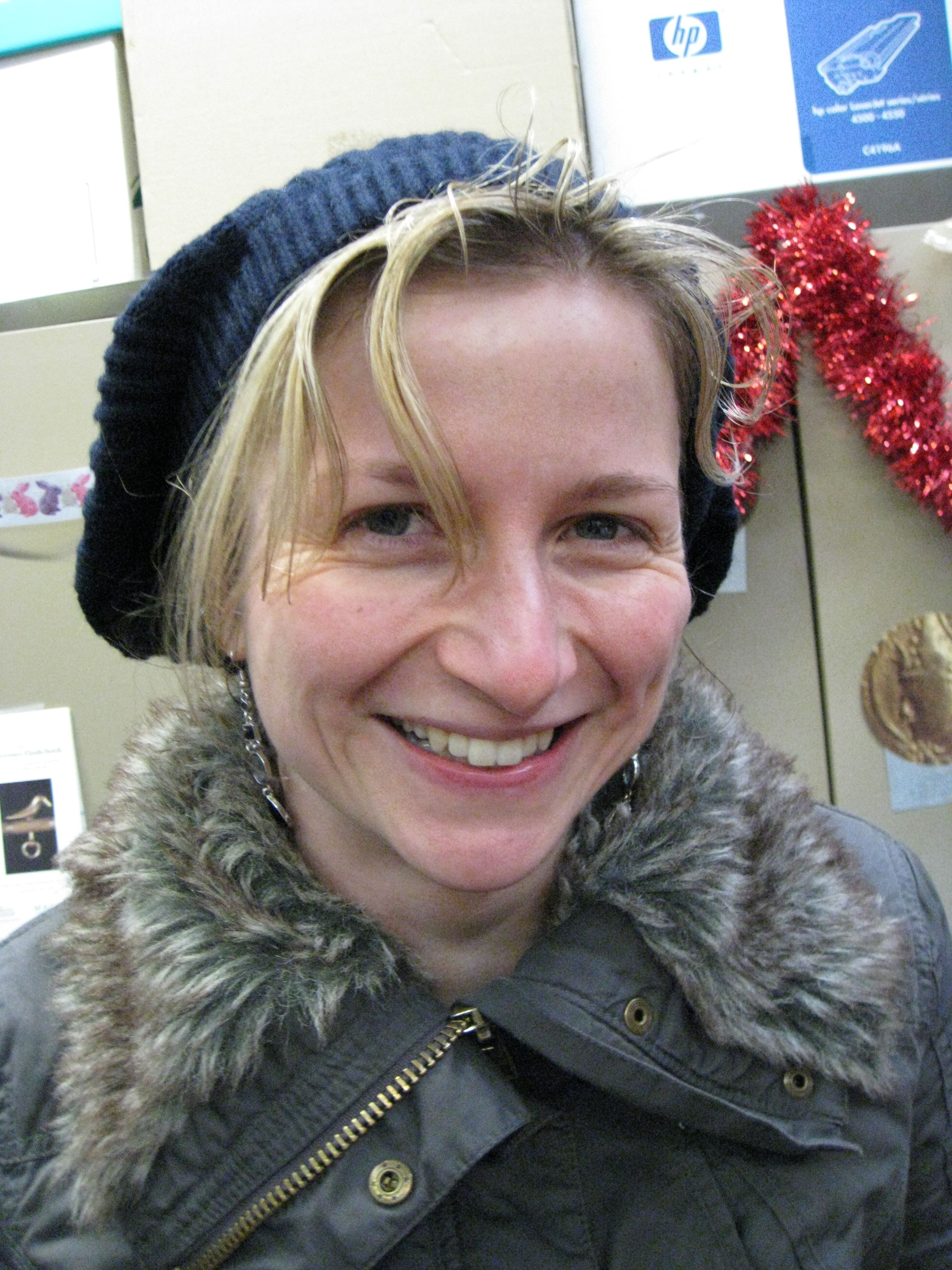
- Occupations: Archaeologist; Numismatist
- Awards: Blunt Prize for Numismatics

Academic work
- Institutions: Oxford archaeology; British Museum; Portable Antiquities Scheme; University of Reading; University of Leicester

Philippa Jane Walton FSA FHEA is a numismatist and archaeologist. She is Lecturer in Roman Archaeology at the University of Leicester.

== Biography ==
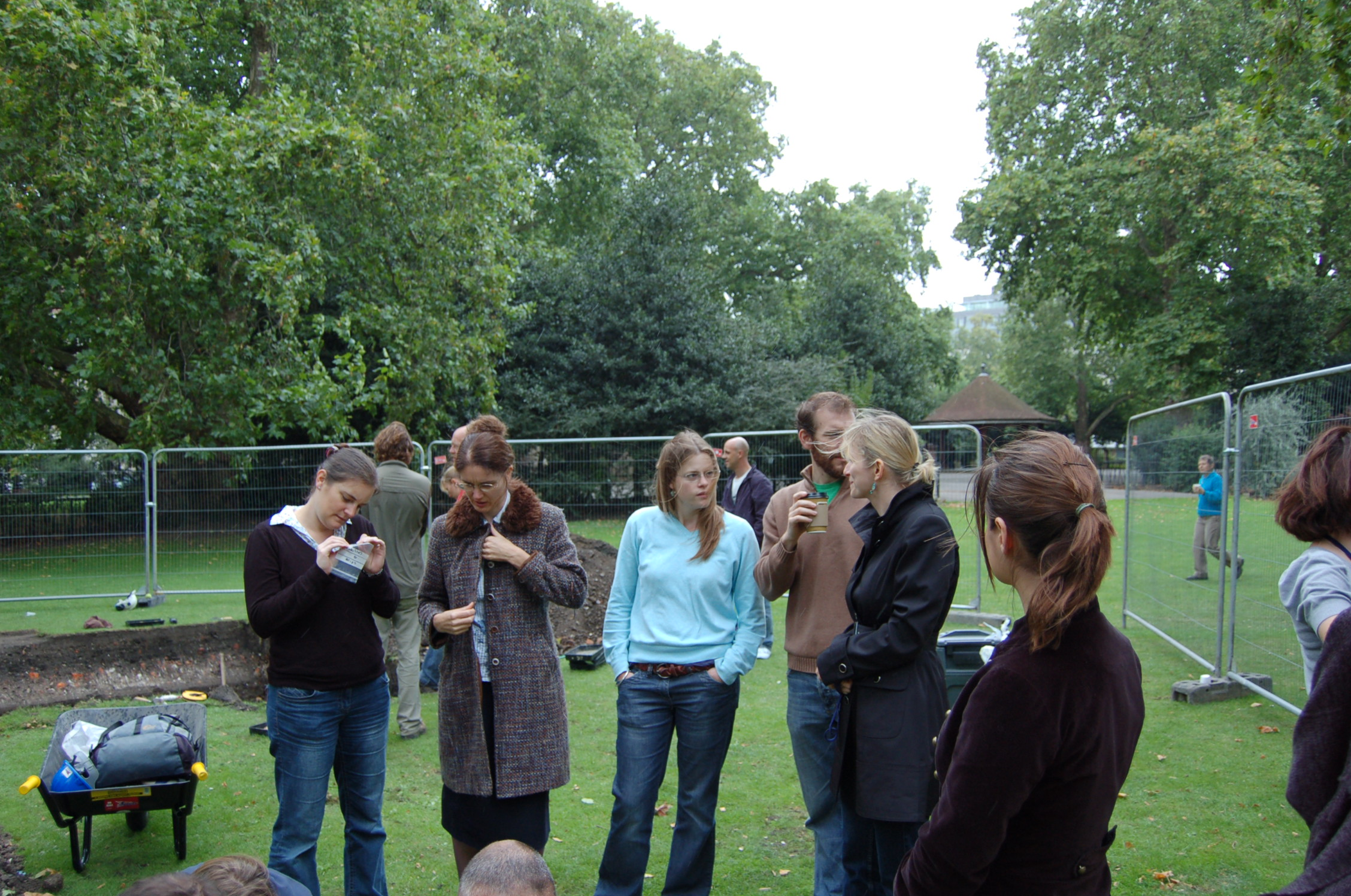
Walton (5th from left) on site at the Time Team Lincoln's Inn Fields excavation.

Walton studied Anglo-Saxon, Norse and Celtic Part I and Classics Part II at Girton College, Cambridge between 1995 and 1998. She then worked in commercial archaeology and for the Portable Antiquities Scheme for 10 years. She completed her PhD at University College London in 2011. Her thesis was titled "Rethinking Roman Britain: an applied numismatic analysis of the Roman coin data recorded by the Portable Antiquities Scheme". Walton was a finds specialist on Time Team from 2005-2011 and has returned as an expert in the new Patreon-funded evolution of the programme.

Walton was the first woman to be awarded the Blunt Prize Numismatics by the British Numismatic Society. She was elected as a Fellow of the Society of Antiquaries of London in January 2025. Walton is also a Fellow of the Higher Education Academy. She is a Trustee of the Roman Research Trust.

== Select publications ==
- 2023. "Where, when and what for? Coin use in the Romano-British countryside", in Villas, sanctuaries and settlement in the Romano-British countryside.
- 2021. (with Hella Eckardt). Bridge over troubled water: The Roman finds from the River Tees at Piercebridge in context.
- 2016. "Coinage and Collapse? The contribution of numismatic data to understanding the end of Roman Britain", Internet Archaeology doi:10.11141/ia.41.8.
