= Nina Crummy =

Archaeologist

Nina Crummy is a British archaeologist and artefact (small finds) specialist, especially of Roman material culture.

== Career ==
Crummy completed an undergraduate degree at Keele University and works as an independent archaeological finds specialist. She was formerly Archaeological Archive Manager at the Museum of London, where she helped develop the Museum's standards for the deposition of archaeological finds. She consolidated the Museum of London's archaeological archive collection, based at Lever Street, the precursor to the London Archaeological Archive & Research Centre (LAARC). She has had a long-standing relationship with the University of Reading, as a visiting research fellow to the Department of Archaeology and as a small finds consultant on the Silchester Town Life Project. She has previously been elected as a fellow to the Society of Antiquaries of London.

She has written numerous archaeological reports and publications on the subject of small finds, ranging from site assemblages to individual artefacts. She is notable for her work on the small finds from Roman Colchester (Camulodunum) and Roman Silchester (Calleva Atrebatum). Major contributions to artefact studies include those on Roman toilet instruments and the manufacture of Roman bone artefacts. Her book, The Roman Small Finds from Excavations in Colchester 1971-9, has been described as the 'bible of the Roman finds world in Britain' by archaeologist and finds specialist Hillary Cool.

== Crummy's Functional Categories for Small Finds ==
Crummy's publication The Roman Small Finds from Excavations in Colchester 1971-9 was one of the first to analyse and present archaeological artefacts (small finds) within 'functional' as opposed to 'material' categories. Although this system of categorisation has been questioned, for simplifying objects' multiple functionality, it remains highly influential especially within Romano-British archaeology.

The subjects of the functional categories are: Category 1: Objects of personal adornment or dress; Category 2: Toilet, surgical or pharmaceutical instruments; Category 3: Objects used in the manufacture or working of textiles; Category 4: Household utensils and furniture; Category 5: Objects used for recreational purposes; Category 6: Objects employed in weighing and measuring; Category 7: Objects used for or associated with written communications; Category 8: Objects associated with transport. Category 9: Buildings and services; Category 10: Tools; Category 11: Fasteners and fittings; Category 12: Objects associated with agriculture, horticulture and animal husbandry. Category 13: Military equipment. Finds such as weapons, fittings from armour, tools with military associations, and phallic amulets possibly used by the army; Category 14: Objects associated with religious beliefs and practices; Category 15: Objects and waste material associated with metal working; Category 16: Objects and waste material associated with antler, horn, bone, and tooth working; Category 17: Objects and waste material associated with the manufacture of pottery vessels or pipeclay objects; Category 18: Objects the function or identification of which is unknown or uncertain.

== Selected publications ==
- Crummy, N. 1979. 'A chronology of Romano-British bone pins'. Britannia 10: 157-163
- Crummy, N. 1981. 'Bone-working at Colchester'. Britannia 12: 277-285
- Crummy, N. 1983. The Roman Small Finds from Excavations in Colchester 1971-9. Colchester: Colchester Archaeological Trust
- Crummy, N. 2002. 'From self-sufficiency to commerce: structural and artifactual evidence for textile manufacture in eastern England in the pre-conquest period. In: D. G. Koslin & J. Snyde (eds). Encountering Medieval Textiles and Dress: Objects, Texts, Images. Basingstoke: Palgrave
- Crummy, N. 2007. 'Six honest serving men: A basic methodology for the study of small find'. In: R. Hingley & S. Willis (eds). Roman finds: context and theory; proceedings of a conference held at the University of Durham, July 2002. Oxford: Oxbow
- Crummy, N. 2010. 'Bears and coins: The iconography of protection in late Roman infant burials'. Britannia 41: 37-93
- Crummy, N. 2011. 'Travel and transport'. In: L. Allason-Jones (ed). Artefacts in Roman Britain: Their Purpose and Use. Cambridge: Cambridge University Press: 46-67
- Crummy, N. 2016. 'Toilet instruments: Symbols of dissent?'. Oxford Journal of Archaeology 35.3: 285-293
- Crummy, N. 2017. 'Working skeletal materials in south-eastern Roman Britain'. In: D. Bird (ed). Agriculture and Industry in South-Eastern Roman Britain. Oxford: Oxbow Books: 255-281
- Crummy, N. 2018. 'The small finds'. In: M. Fulford, A. Clarke, E. Durham & N. Pankhurst. Late Iron Age Calleva: The Pre-conquest Occupation at Silchester Insula IX

Edited Publications

- Crummy, N. (ed). 2005. Image, Craft and the Classical World: Essays in Honour of Donald Bailey and Catherine Johns. Monographies Instrumentum 29. Montagnac: M. Mergoil

Co-authored Publications

- Crummy, N., Crummy, P. & Crossan, C. 1993. Excavations of Roman and Later Cemeteries, Churches and Monastic Sites in Colchester, 1971-88. Colchester: Colchester Archaeological Trust
- Crummy, N. & Davis, G.J.C. 2020. 'A black mineral amulet from Colchester's north cemetery. Britannia 51
- Crummy, N., Henig, M. & Ward, C. 2016. A hoard of military awards, jewellery and coins from Colchester. Britannia 47: 1-28
- Eckardt, H. & Crummy, N. 2008. Styling the body in Later Iron Age and Roman Britain: A Contextual Approach to Toilet Instruments. Monagnac: Instrumentum Monograph
