= Eleanor Scott (archaeologist) =

Archaeologist

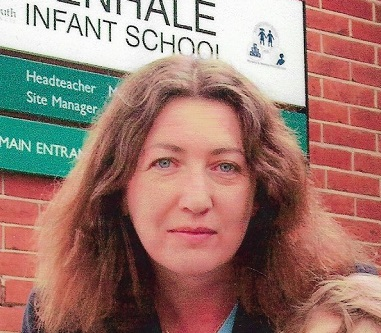
- Dr Eleanor Scott
- Born: 8 July 1960 (age 66)

Academic background
- Education: University of Newcastle
- Thesis: Aspects of the Roman Villa as a Form of British Settlement (1988)

Academic work
- Discipline: Archaeology
- Sub-discipline: Classical archaeology Archaeological theory
- Main interests: Roman villas; Roman jewellery; Roman childhood

Eleanor Scott (born 8 July 1960) is a British archaeologist and politician. She founded the Theoretical Roman Archaeology Conference (TRAC) in 1991.

== Career ==
Scott is from the Isle of Man. She graduated from Newcastle University in 1982, subsequently completing her PhD on Romano-British villas funded by the Isle of Man. Scott has published several monographs and contributed many articles to journals in addition to contributing to public outreach programmes such as the Day of Archaeology.

Scott founded the Theoretical Roman Archaeology Conference in 1991. TRAC was founded as a response of criticism in the late 1980s of a lack of theoretical basis in Roman archaeology and the conference has since become an annual series. The progression of scholars participating in these conferences into academia and museums has consequently positioned theory at the core of Roman Archaeology and changed the direction of the discipline.

=== Political career ===
Scott was a Liberal Democrat member of Portsmouth City Council from 2002 to 2015, and she resigned in January 2014. Portsmouth City Council conferred the title of honorary alderman on her in 2016.

== Selected works ==
- Scott, E. (ed) 1993. Theoretical Roman Archaeology: First Conference Proceedings (TRAC 1). Aldershot.
- Scott, E. 1993. A Gazetteer of Roman Villas in Britain.University of Leicester School of Archaeological Studies. ISBN 0951037749
- Scott, E. and Moore, J. (eds) 1996. Invisible People and Places. Writing Gender and Childhood into European Archaeology. Routledge. ISBN 0718500237
- Scott, E. 1999. The archaeology of infancy and infant death. Archaeopress. ISBN 1841710326.
