= Journal of Social Archaeology =

Peer-reviewed academic journal

- Discipline: Archaeology
- Language: English
- Edited by: Lynn Meskell

Publication details
- History: 2001-present
- Publisher: SAGE Publications
- Frequency: Triannually
- Impact factor: 2.000 (2017)

Standard abbreviations
- ISO 4: J. Soc. Archaeol.

Indexing
- ISSN: 1469-6053 (print); 1741-2951 (web)
- LCCN: 2001223309
- OCLC no.: 48009098

Links
- Journal homepage; Online access; Online archive

The Journal of Social Archaeology is a triannual peer-reviewed academic journal that covers the field of archaeology, in particular with regard to social interpretations of the past. Its editor-in-chief is Lynn Meskell (Stanford University), who established the journal in 2001. It is currently published by SAGE Publications.

== Scope ==
The Journal of Social Archaeology covers research on social approaches in archaeology, including feminism, queer theory, postcolonialism, social geography, literary theory, politics, anthropology, cognitive studies, and behavioural science, from prehistoric to present-day contexts. The journal also covers contemporary politics and heritage issues, and aims to break down the "arbitrary and hegemonic boundaries between North American, Classical, Near Eastern, Mesoamerican, European and Australian archaeologies – and beyond".

== Contents ==
The Journal of Social Archaeology is published in February, June, and October. Each issue contains 5-7 articles, occasionally featuring interviews with social theorists considered "prominent" by the editors.

== Abstracting and indexing ==
The Journal of Social Archaeology is abstracted and indexed in:

- Academic Search Premier
- Arts & Humanities Citation Index
- Current Contents/Arts & Humanities
- Educational Research Abstracts Online
- Scopus
