= The Face of Battle =

1976 book by John Keegan

- First edition
- Author: John Keegan
- Language: English
- Genre: History
- Publisher: Jonathan Cape
- Publication place: United Kingdom

The Face of Battle is a 1976 non-fiction book on military history by the English military historian John Keegan.

It deals first with the structure of historical writing about battles, the strengths and weaknesses of the "battle piece," and then with the structure of warfare in three time periods—medieval Europe, the Napoleonic Era, and World War I—by analyzing three battles: Agincourt, Waterloo, and the Somme, all of which involved English soldiers and occurred in approximately the same geographical area.

== Reception ==
When published, the work was groundbreaking. It does not examine the battles only from the point of view of the generals nor does it simply accumulate quotes from ordinary soldiers. Instead, it focuses on the practical mechanics of battle and critically examines popular myths about warfare. For instance, Keegan disputes the effectiveness of cavalry charges in the Middle Ages. At Agincourt, the lightly armoured archers dug stakes into the ground to impede horses, while heavy infantry who stood their ground had little to fear from cavalry. Focusing on the mechanics of battle, Keegan discusses troop spacing, the effectiveness of weapons and formations, and other measures of tactical importance. He also examines the experience of the individual soldier of the time.

== Editions ==
The book was originally published in the United Kingdom by Jonathan Cape and in the United States by the Viking Press. A new edition was published by Viking in 1988 titled, The Illustrated Face of Battle, with additional maps, diagrams, paintings, and photographs. The Folio Society issued an edition in 2009.
