= Britannia (journal) =

Academic journal

- Discipline: Archaeology
- Language: English
- Edited by: Hella Eckardt

Publication details
- History: 1970–present
- Publisher: Cambridge University Press on behalf of the Society for the Promotion of Roman Studies (United Kingdom)
- Frequency: Annual

Standard abbreviations
- ISO 4: Britannia

Indexing
- ISSN: 0068-113X (print); 1753-5352 (web)
- LCCN: 87640036
- OCLC no.: 754651093

Links
- Journal homepage; Online access; Online archive

Britannia is an annual peer-reviewed academic journal published by Cambridge University Press on behalf of the Society for the Promotion of Roman Studies. It was established in 1970 and the first editor-in-chief was Sheppard Frere. The journal covers research on the province of Roman Britain, Iron Age and post-Roman Britain, and western provincial archaeology, as well as excavation reports. It was established because of the large increase in archaeological excavations, increased publication costs, and in order to establish coherence to the field of Roman Britain.

The journal includes the section Roman Britain in... which summarises sites explored and inscriptions, and which continue the series Roman Inscriptions of Britain. In 2017 the conference "Retrospect and Prospect: 50 years of Britannia and the state of Romano-British archaeology" was held to mark the 50th anniversary of the journal. The current editor is Hella Eckardt.

== Editors-in-chief ==
The following persons are or have been editors-in-chief:

- Sheppard Frere (1970–)
- Simon Esmonde Cleary (2004–2009)
- Barry C. Burnham (-2018)
- Hella Eckardt (2018–2021)
- Will Bowden (2022–2025)
- Andrew Gardner (2026–present)

== Abstracting and indexing ==
The journal is abstracted and indexed in Arts and Humanities Citation Index, L'Année philologique, Linguistic Bibliography, and Scopus.
