= Theoretical Roman Archaeology Conference =

Theoretical Roman Archaeology Conference (TRAC)
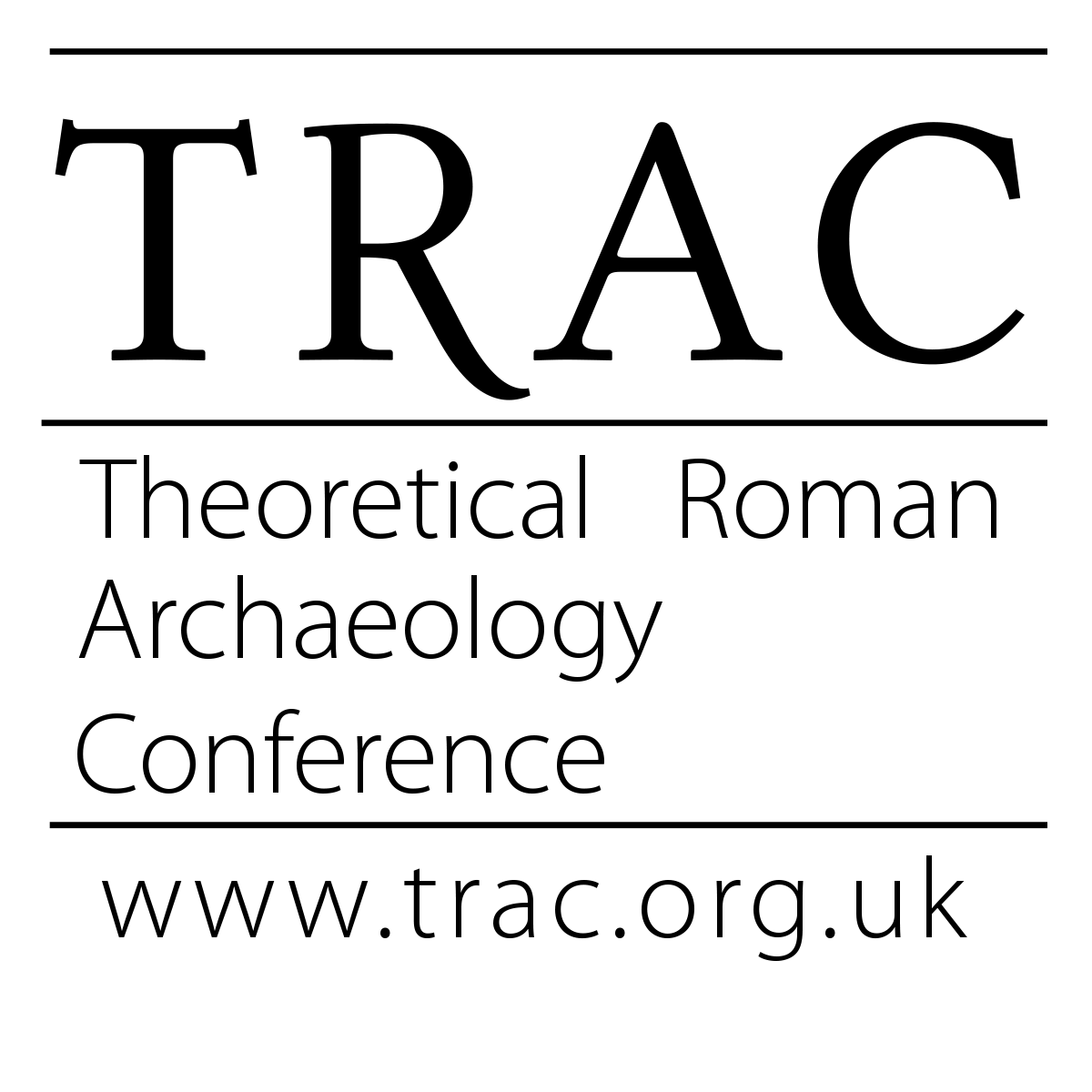
- Logo of TRAC
- Formation: March 1991; 35 years ago
- Founder: Eleanor Scott
- Founded at: University of Newcastle
- Purpose: Promotion of a theoretical discourse in Anglophone Roman archaeology
- Website: http://trac.org.uk/

The Theoretical Roman Archaeology Conference (TRAC) is an academic organisation and conference for the discussion of archaeological theory in Roman archaeology.

== History ==
The first Theoretical Roman Archaeology Conference was organised by Eleanor Scott and was hosted by the Department of Archaeology at the University of Newcastle in March 1991. The conference had been created by Scott to address the shortcomings of traditional Roman archaeology through critical, theory-driven discussions inspired by the Theoretical Archaeology Group conferences. The conference was a success and, due to interest, became an annual conference hosted by different archaeology departments annually across the UK, Europe and North America.

Since 1995, the Theoretical Roman Archaeology Conference have partnered with the Roman Archaeology Conference (RAC), which is organised by the Roman Society. The collaboration began at University of Reading, establishing a biannual arrangement where the RAC played a role in helping to organise TRAC.

TRAC initially concentrated on Romanisation debates, especially in the 1990s. Since the early 2000s, however, discussions have increasingly shifted to post-imperial and post-colonial perspectives of the Roman world. Since the 2010s, TRAC has attempted to expand its outreach and appeal internationally.

Many TRAC participants are early career researchers or postgraduates who present their own original research. Andrew Gardner highlighted a gender imbalance at TRAC in 2005, but Eleanor Scott later noted that TRAC provided equal opportunities to female archaeologists.

TRAC was initially published as conference proceedings but became an online open access journal, the Theoretical Roman Archaeology Journal, under the Open Library of Humanities from 2017 onwards.

== List of TRAC Annual Meetings ==
The Theoretical Roman Archaeology Conferences and joint Roman Archaeology Conferences (RAC) have been held or planned at the following institutions or cities:

Year	Meeting Sequence	Host Institution / City	Conference Dates
2026	34th	Aarhus University	21-23 May
2025	33rd	TRAC 2025 (Note: This will be an online conference.) (Note: This conference will be an international collaboration between the TRAC and the Theorien in der Archäologie (TIdA) organisation in Germany.)	22-24 October
2024	32nd	University College London (Note: Jointly held with the Roman Archaeology Conference (RAC).)	11-14 April
2023	31st	University of Exeter	27-29 April
2020	30th	Split (Note: Due to the Covid-19 pandemic, this conference was postponed.)	6-8 April
2019	29th	University of Kent	11-14 April
2018	28th	University of Edinburgh	12-14 April
2017	27th	Durham University	28-31 March
2016	26th	Sapienza Università di Roma	16-19 March
2015	25th	University of Leicester	27-29 March
2014	24th	University of Reading	28-30 March
2013	23rd	King's College London	4-6 April
2012	22nd	University of Frankfurt	29 March-1 April
2011	21st	University of Newcastle	14-17 April
2010	20th	University of Oxford	25-28 March
2009	19th	University of Southampton (Note: Jointly held with the United States Roman Archaeology Conference (US-RAC).)	17–18 April
2009	19th	University of Michigan	3-5 April
2008	18th	University of Amsterdam	4-6 March
2007	17th	University College London	29 March -1 April
2006	16th	University of Cambridge	24-25 March
2005	15th	University of Birmingham	31 March - 3 April
2004	14th	Durham University	26-27 March
2003	13th	University of Leicester	3-6 April
2002	12th	University of Kent	5-6 April
2001	11th	University of Glasgow	29-31 March
2000	10th	University College London	6-7 April
1999	9th	Durham University	April
1998	8th	University of Leicester	April
1997	7th	University of Nottingham	April
1996	6th	University of Sheffield	30-31 March
1995	5th	University of Reading	
1994	4th	Durham University	March
1993	3rd	University of Glasgow	
1992	2nd	University of Bradford	28-29 March
1991	1st	Newcastle University	23–24 March
