= Joanne Elizabeth Cutler =

British archaeologist (1962–2018)

- Born: 1962
- Died: 24 January 2018 (aged 55–56)

Academic background
- Education: University College London; Open University

Academic work
- Discipline: Archaeology
- Sub-discipline: Aegean prehistory; Mediterranean prehistory; Bronze Age; Iron Age
- Main interests: Textile production Weaving technology Cultural interaction
- Notable works: Crafting Minoanisation (2021)

Joanne Elizabeth Cutler (1962 – 24 January 2018) was a British archaeologist specialising in Aegean and Mediterranean prehistory. Her research examined textile production, weaving technology, and the social and cultural dynamics of craft in the Bronze and Iron Age Mediterranean. She was a Research Associate at the McDonald Institute for Archaeological Research, University of Cambridge.

== Education ==
Cutler studied at the UCL Institute of Archaeology, completing a BA in Archaeology in 2005 and an MA in the Archaeology of the Eastern Mediterranean and Middle East in 2006. At the same time she earned a BA in Humanities with Classical Studies at the Open University.

She completed her PhD in Archaeology at UCL in 2011 under the supervision of Todd Whitelaw and Cyprian Broodbank. Her dissertation, Crafting Minoanisation: Textiles, Crafts Production and Social Dynamics in the Bronze Age Southern Aegean, became the basis for her later monograph.

== Career ==
Cutler held visiting and research positions at the Centre for Textile Research, University of Copenhagen, where she worked on the project Tools and Textiles, Texts and Contexts. She received a Marie Curie/Gerda Henkel Intra-European Postdoctoral Fellowship (2013–2015) for the project Weaving the Fabric of Society: Bronze Age Aegean Economies of Cloth.

In 2012 she was awarded the Michael Ventris Award for Mycenaean Studies for research on textile production and social dynamics in East Crete.

From 2015 she was a Research Associate on Margarita Gleba’s European Research Council project Production and Consumption: Textile Economy and Urbanisation in Mediterranean Europe 1000–500 BCE (PROCON), first at UCL and later at the McDonald Institute, Cambridge.

She also took part in archaeological fieldwork in Greece and Turkey, including the Kythera Island Project, the Antikythera Survey Project, and the Knossos Urban Landscape Project.

=== Research ===
Cutler’s research examined the role of textiles in prehistoric societies, with a focus on production, technology, and the organisation of labour. She investigated how weaving and textile technologies influenced cultural interaction and identity during processes such as Minoanisation and Mycenaeanisation. Her work combined archaeological analysis with experimental approaches, including training in weaving and pottery to reconstruct ancient production techniques.

== Selected works ==
- Cutler, J. (2021). Crafting Minoanisation: Textiles, Crafts Production and Social Dynamics in the Bronze Age Southern Aegean. Oxford: Oxbow Books. doi:10.2307/j.ctv13pk75k.
- Andersson Strand, E., Cutler, J., & Nosch, M.-L. (eds.) (2015). Tools, Textiles and Contexts: Investigating Textile Production in the Aegean and Eastern Mediterranean Bronze Age. Oxford: Oxbow Books.
- Cutler, J. (2016). “Fashioning identity: weaving technology, dress and cultural change in the Middle and Late Bronze Age southern Aegean.” In Gorogianni, Pavúk & Girella (eds.), Beyond Thalassocracies. Oxford: Oxbow Books.
