= Scarre =

Scarre is a surname. Notable people with the surname include:

- Chris Scarre, English archaeologist and writer
- Geoffrey Scarre, moral philosopher
