= Gilly Carr =

Archaeologist and academic

Professor Gilly Carr OBE FSA FRHistS
- Born: 7 January 1972 (age 54)
- Title: Professor of Conflict Archaeology and Holocaust Heritage

Academic background
- Doctoral advisor: Simon Stoddart

Academic work
- Discipline: Archaeology
- Sub-discipline: conflict archaeology; Holocaust archaeology; Iron Age; Roman Archaeology
- Institutions: St Catharine's College, Cambridge; International Holocaust Remembrance Alliance; Institute of Continuing Education

Gillian Clare Carr (born 7 January 1972) is a British archaeologist and academic. She currently specialises in the Holocaust and conflict archaeology, while her early career research focused on the Iron Age and Roman Archaeology. She is Professor of Conflict Archaeology and Holocaust Heritage at the University of Cambridge's Institute of Continuing Education, and a fellow and director of studies in archaeology at St Catharine's College, Cambridge. In 2019, she was elected a Fellow of the Society of Antiquaries of London and of the Royal Historical Society. In 2020, she won the EAA European Heritage Prize for her work on the heritage of victims of Nazism.

== Biography ==
Carr was born on 7 January 1972 in Barking, Essex, England. She studied archaeological science at the University of Bradford, graduating with a first class honours Bachelor of Science (BSc) degree in 1994. She then went on to study world archaeology at St John's College, Cambridge, graduating with a Master of Philosophy (MPhil) degree in 1995. She was awarded a Doctor of Philosophy (PhD) degree in archaeology by the University of Cambridge in 1999. Her doctoral thesis was titled "Romanization and the body: changing identities in the Later Iron Age and Early Roman period in the territory of the Trinovantes and Catuvellauni".

From 2000 to 2006, Carr was a research fellow at Hughes Hall, Cambridge. During this time, she was also a teaching fellow in archaeology at the University of Kent (2001–03), and a staff tutor in archaeology at the Institute of Continuing Education, University of Cambridge (2003–06). Since 2006, she has been a fellow of St Catharine's College, Cambridge and a university lecturer in archaeology. She was promoted to senior lecturer in 2012, associate professor in 2021, and appointed Professor of Conflict Archaeology and Holocaust Heritage in 2024. She is also academic director in archaeology at the Institute of Continuing Education (ICE), a partner of the Cambridge Heritage Research Centre, and a member of the McDonald Institute for Archaeological Research.

She is a member of the UK delegation of the International Holocaust Remembrance Alliance, and a member of the Academic Advisory Board for the UK Holocaust Memorial and Learning Centre. She current chairs IHRA's 'Safeguarding Sites ' project, which is writing a charter to safeguard Holocaust heritage in Europe.

=== Research ===
Carr's graduate degrees and early research was on the Iron Age and Roman Archaeology. Her current work centres on Conflict Archaeology and war heritage, especially that of World War II in Europe. Her research focuses, among other topics, on the history and legacy of the German occupation of the Channel Islands, the Nazi labor camps in the Islands and the victims of Nazism. Carr researched the German occupation of the Channel Islands and the deportation of over 200 islanders for acts of protest, defiance and resistance. This work can be seen in her website, the Frank Falla Archive. Her work on Channel Islander victims of Nazism were the subject of an exhibition titled: On British Soil: Victims of Nazi Persecution in the Channel Islands at the Wiener Holocaust Library from October 2017 to February 2018. The exhibition also has a permanent online presence at the library. The exhibition then moved to Guernsey Museum in 2019.

Carr has also researched the material culture of the Channel Islanders deported to internment camps in Germany during the Second World War. She has published over 70 journal articles and books on her research. She is one of the 12 members of the UK delegation to the International Holocaust Remembrance Alliance.

== Awards and honours ==
In 2016, Carr was a recipient of the Cambridge University's Vice-Chancellor Awards for Impact. On 10 October 2019, Carr was elected as a Fellow to the Society of Antiquaries of London. She was also elected a Fellow of the Royal Historical Society (FRHistS) in 2019. In 2020, she was awarded the EAA European Heritage Prize.

In the 2025 New Year Honours, Carr was appointed Officer of the Order of the British Empire (OBE) for services to Holocaust research and education.

== Select publications ==
=== Selected Recent Journal Papers ===
- Carr, G. (2015). ‘Have you been offended? Holocaust memory in the Channel Islands at HMD 70. Holocaust Studies: a Journal of Culture and History. 22(1): 44-64. DOI: 10.1080/17504902.2015.1103026
- Carr, G. (2016). ‘Illicit Antiquities’? The Collection of Nazi militaria in the Channel Islands. World Archaeology48(1). DOI: 10.1080/00438243.2016.1152196
- Carr, G. and Sturdy Colls, C. 2016. "Taboo and Sensitive Heritage: Labour camps, burials and the role of activism in the Channel Islands", International Journal of Heritage Studies 22 (9): 702-715. doi:10.1080/13527258.2016.1191524
- Carr, Gillian (2017). "Nazi camps on British soil: the excavation of Lager Wick forced labour camp in Jersey, Channel Islands". Journal of Conflict Archaeology: 135–157.
- Carr, G. (2017). The Small Things of Life and Death: an exploration of value and meaning in the material culture of Nazi camps. International Journal of Historical Archaeology. DOI 10.1007/s10761-017-0435-0
- Carr, G. (2019) The Jew and the Jerrybag: the lives of Hedwig Bercu and Dorothea Le Brocq. Journal of Holocaust and Genocide Studies. Vol. 33(2).
- Carr, G. (2021) 'You are requested to ascertain the nationality of Jews residing in Guernsey': analysing an artefact of collaboration from the Channel Island of Guernsey, 1933-1940. Holocaust Studies: A Journal of Culture and History.
- Carr, G. (2022) Narratives of Resistance, Moral Compromise and Perpetration: the testimonies of Julia Brichta, survivor of Ravensbrueck', The Journal of Holocaust Research vol. 36(4): 240-260.

=== Books ===
[5 previous volumes on Iron Age and Roman Archaeology, one authored and four co-edited]

- Carr, G. 2009. Occupied Behind Barbed Wire. Jersey Heritage.
- Carr, G. and Mytum, H. (eds) 2012. Cultural Heritage and Prisoners of War: Creativity Behind Barbed Wire. New York: Routledge.
- Mytum, H. and Carr, G. (eds) 2013. Prisoners of War: Archaeology, Memory and Heritage of 19th and 20th Century Mass Internment. Springer.
- Carr, G. 2014. Legacies of Occupation: Archaeology, Heritage and Memory in the Channel Islands. Springer.
- Carr, G., Wilmott, L. and Sanders, P. 2014. Protest, Defiance and Resistance in the German Occupied Channel Islands, 1940-1945. Bloomsbury Academic.
- Carr, G. and Reeves, K. (eds.) 2015. Heritage and Memory of War: Responses from small islands. Routledge: New York.
- Carr, G. 2019. On British Soil. McDonald Institute.
- Carr, G. 2019. Victims of Nazism in the Channel Islands: A legitimate Heritage? Bloomsbury Academic.
- Carr, G. 2020. Nazi Prisons in the British Isles. Pen and Sword.
- Carr, G. and Pistol, R. (eds). 2022. (forthcoming). British Internment and the Internment of Britons: Second World War Camps, History and Heritage. Bloomsbury Academic.
- Carr, G. (forthcoming). A Materiality of Internment. Routledge.

== See also ==
- Alderney camps
