= University of Cambridge Professional and Continuing Education =

Institute within the University of Cambridge

Coordinates: 52.2248°N 0.0374°E

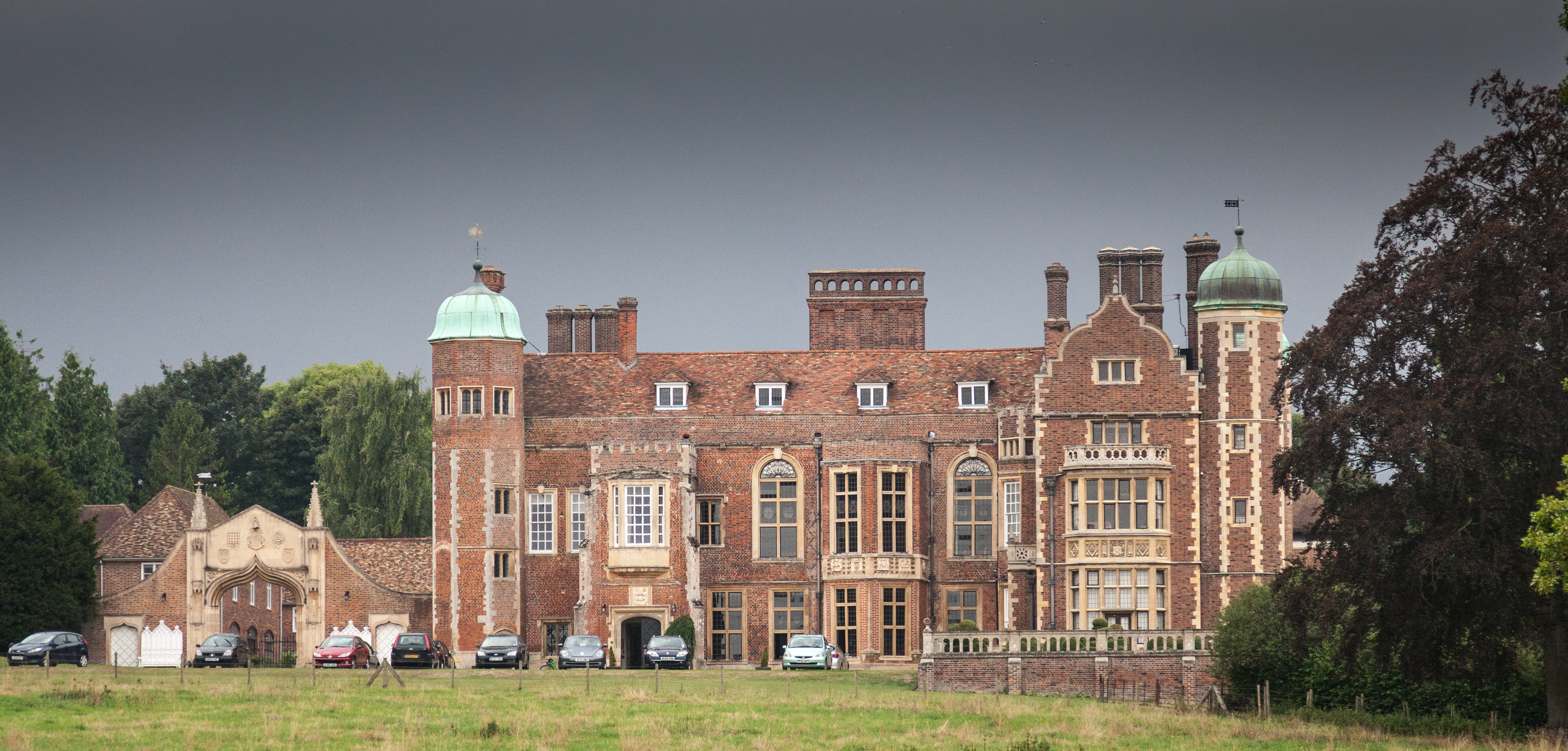
- Madingley Hall
- Established: 1873
- Founder: James Stuart
- Affiliations: University of Cambridge
- Director: James Gazzard
- Students: 6,000
- Location: Madingley, England
- Website: www.pace.cam.ac.uk

The University of Cambridge Professional and Continuing Education (PACE), formerly the Institute of Continuing Education (ICE) is a department of the University of Cambridge that provides continuing education programmes at undergraduate and postgraduate levels, ranging from undergraduate certificates to master's degrees.

PACE is the world's oldest university department specialising in professional and continuing education, established in 1873. It is based at the 16th-century Madingley Hall, four miles west of Cambridge. It was rebranded as the PACE in 2025 and delivers a number of undergraduate and postgraduate awards, alongside the university's annual summer school. Award-bearing graduates are recognised as alumni of the University of Cambridge.

== History ==
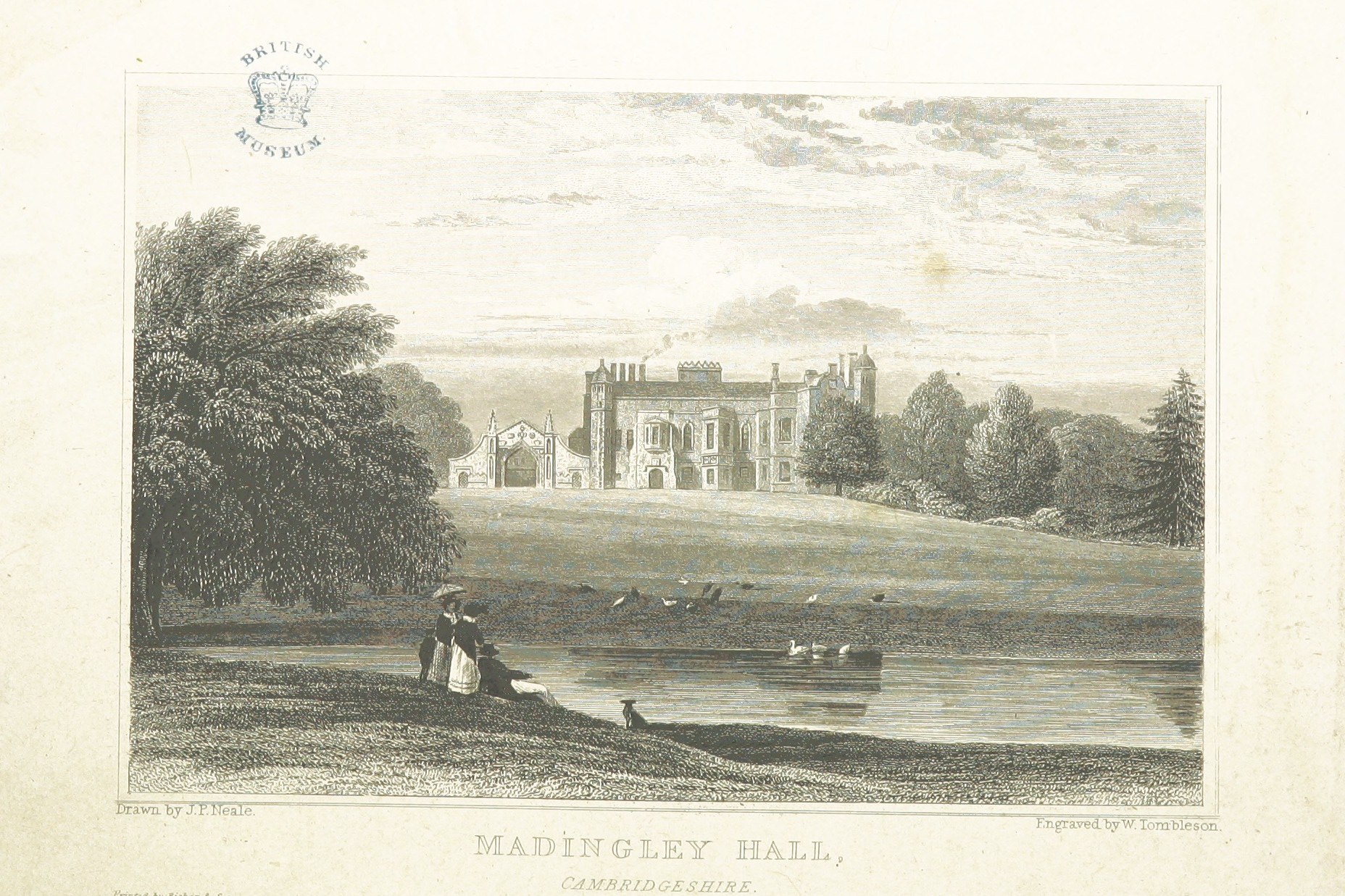
Madingley Hall (1824).

University of Cambridge Professional and Continuing Education (PACE) was founded as the Local Lectures Syndicate in 1873 by the University of Cambridge engineer James Stuart. It has also been previously known as the Institute of Continuing Education (ICE), the Board of Extra-Mural Studies (BEMS) and the Board for Continuing Education.

In 1867, the suffragist Anne Clough and the North of England Council for Promoting the Higher Education of Women commissioned James Stuart to deliver a course of lectures in five English cities in direct response to the growing need for educational opportunity for girls and women. These lecturers marked the beginning of the university extension movement, which aimed to provide tertiary teaching for those unable to go to university. Extension centres, guided by Cambridge academics, in cities such as Exeter and Sheffield were central to the formation of new university colleges and led to the expansion of universities in cities across England in the late 1800s.

The University of Cambridge sanctioned the university extension movement in 1873, when it offered its first course commencing in Derby on 8 October. In the same year, the university appointed the Local Lectures Syndicate, which included James Stuart, as well as Brooke Westcott, Joseph Lightfoot, and Henry Sidgwick. In 1924, the Local Lectures Syndicate became the autonomous Board of Extra-Mural Studies (BEMS) and it found a new permanent home a few years when it moved to the newly built Stuart House in Mill Lane, Cambridge in 1927. The board was based at Stuart House until 1975, when it moved to Madingley Hall in Cambridgeshire.

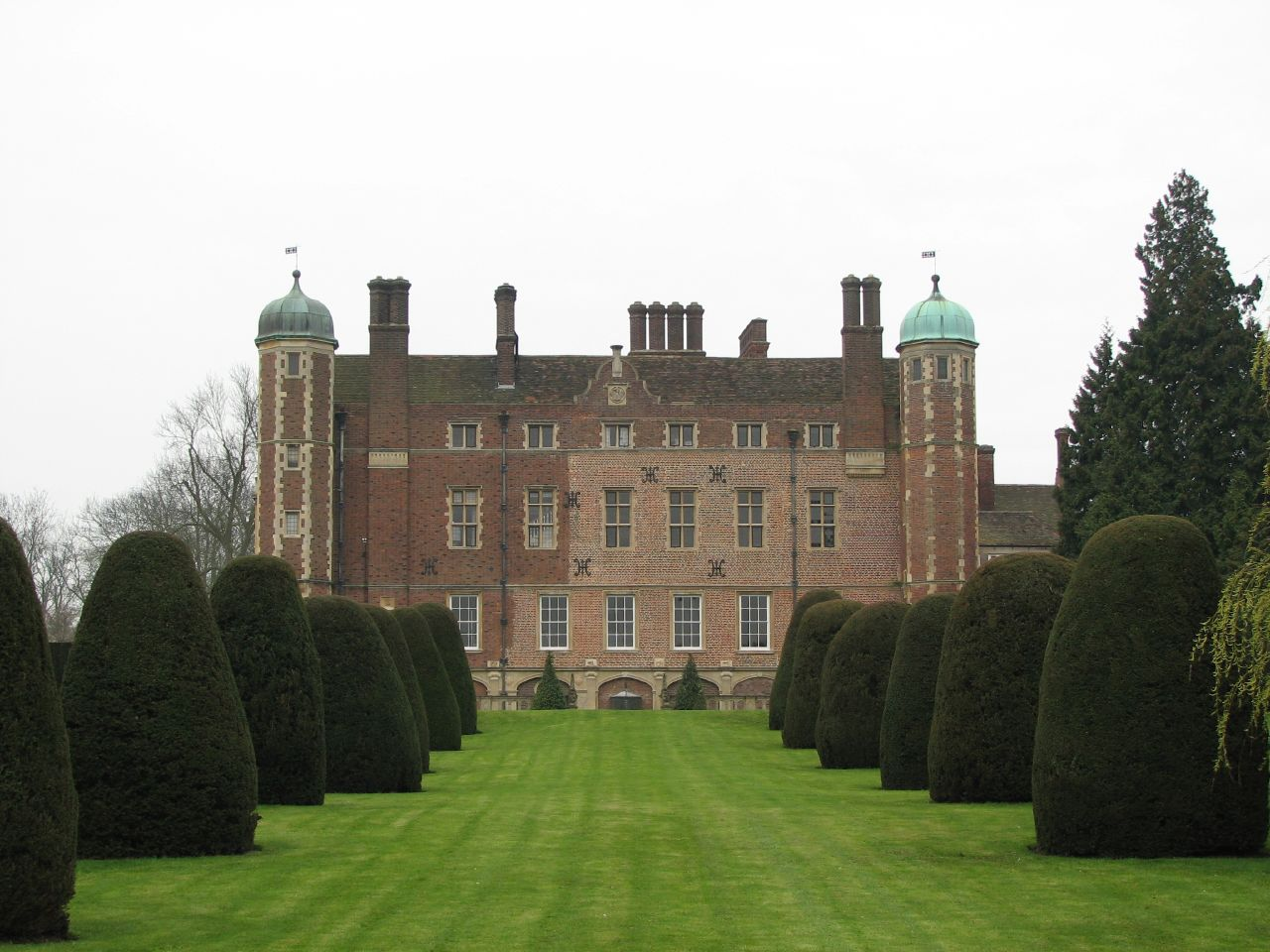
Madingley Hall viewed from the gardens.

In August 1991, the Board of Extra-Mural Studies (BEMS) was renamed as The Board for Continuing Education. The institute received its current name on 1 January 2001.

=== Directors ===
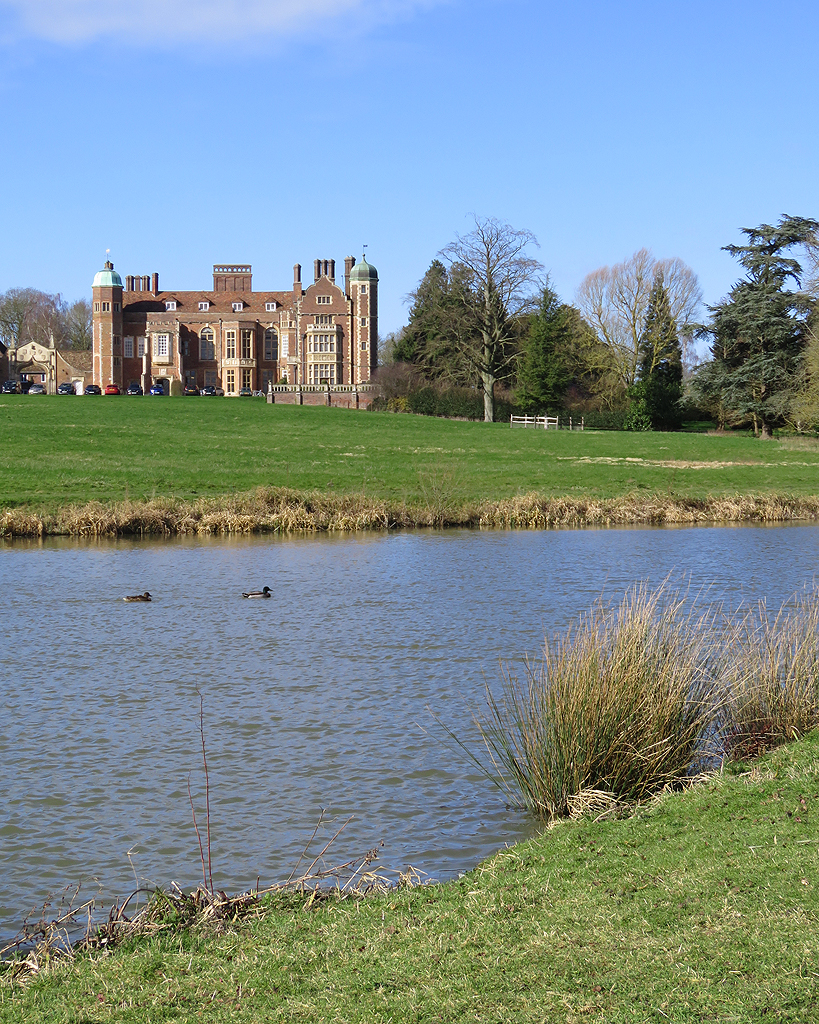
Madingley Hall lake.

Name	Period
James Stuart and Reverend V.H. Stanton (Joint Secretaries)	1873-1876
Reverend G. F. Browne	1876-1891
Arthur Berry	1891-1894
R.D. Roberts	1894-1902
Reverend D.H.S Cranage	1902-1928
Geoffrey Hickson	1928-1967
John Andrew	1967-1977
Leslie Wayper	1977-1980
Michael Allen	1980-1990
Susan Rawlings (interim director)	1990-1990
Michael Richardson	1990-2003
Susan Rawlings (interim director)	2003-2004
Richard Taylor	2004-2009
Rebecca Lingwood	2009-2015
Sir Michael Gregory (interim director)	2015-2016
James Gazzard	2016–2025
Kirsty Allen (interim director)	2025–present

== Location and buildings ==
Professional and Continuing Education headquarters are in the village of Madingley, Cambridgeshire. It is housed in Madingley Hall, about four miles west of the Cambridge city limits. Madingley Hall was built in the 1540s and was later rented by Queen Victoria for the young Prince of Wales (later Edward VII) while he was a student at Cambridge. The Hall incorporates 14 classrooms, 62 study bedrooms and full catering.

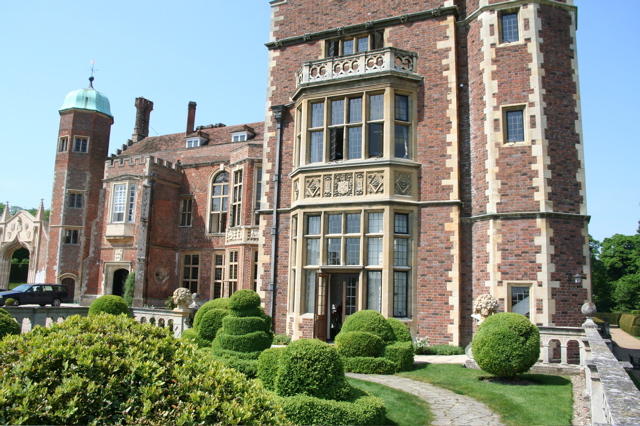
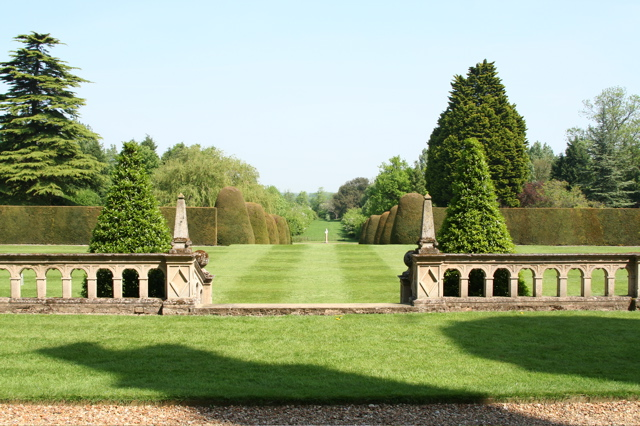
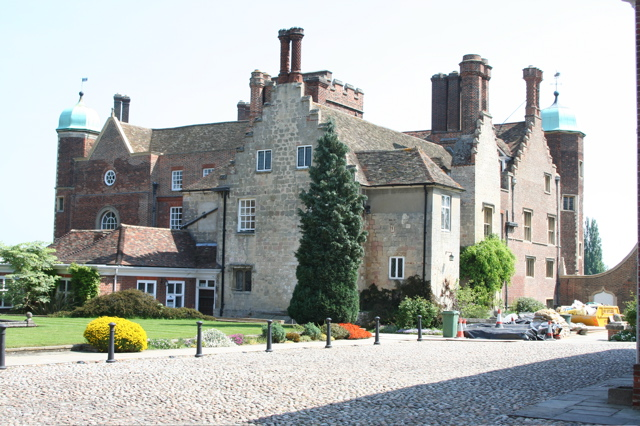
From left to right: Madingley Hall, East front; The grounds of Madingley Hall; Madingley Hall, South front

== Academic overview ==
PACE offers residential, weekend, summer, part-time, and distance learning courses, as well as public lectures. The duration of study varies, from one and two-day courses, through two-year part-time master's degrees, and courses are often taken for personal interest or for professional development.

Students can study towards University of Cambridge qualifications, such as undergraduate sub-degrees and postgraduate qualifications, including a Master of Studies qualification which allows students to matriculate through a Cambridge college.

PACE employs a group of academic directors across its major discipline areas, a number of these academics are also university teaching officers and some hold college affiliations. Their teaching is also accomplished by a panel of about 300 tutors located in the Cambridge area and elsewhere.

=== Undergraduate certificates, diplomas and advanced diplomas ===
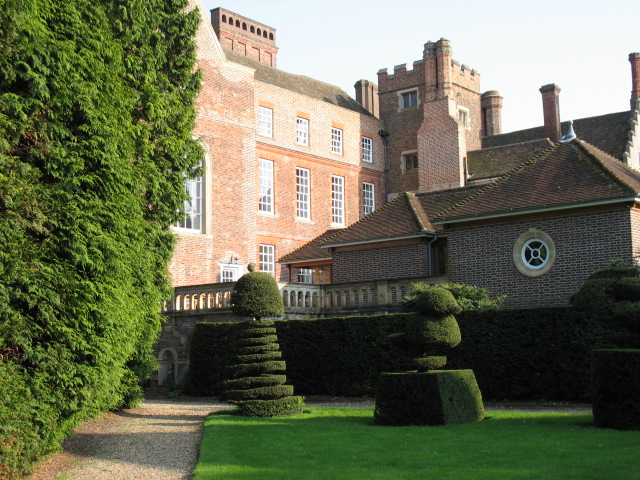
Madingley Hall.

PACE's undergraduate courses cover over 30 subjects and all courses are accredited via the United Kingdom's Credit Accumulation and Transfer Scheme (CATS). The undergraduate award-bearing courses are studied part-time over an academic year. A certificate is a FHEQ level 4 award, a diploma is a FHEQ level 5 award and an advanced diploma is a FHEQ level 6 award. PACE offers undergraduate certificates, diplomas and an undergraduate research-based advanced diploma, which lasts two years and it's equivalent to the completion of the third year of full-time undergraduate study at a BA level. Both the Undergraduate Advanced Diploma in Research in the Arts/Sciences and the Advanced Diploma in Economics (from the Faculty of Economics) are considered as equivalent to a second bachelor’s degree and they enable students to apply for postgraduate studies such as master's degree or Postgraduate Diploma.

=== Postgraduate certificates and diplomas ===
PACE's one-year part-time postgraduate (FHEQ level 7) courses give students the opportunity to gain a recognised qualification in the arts, sciences or professional disciplines.

=== Part-time master's degrees ===
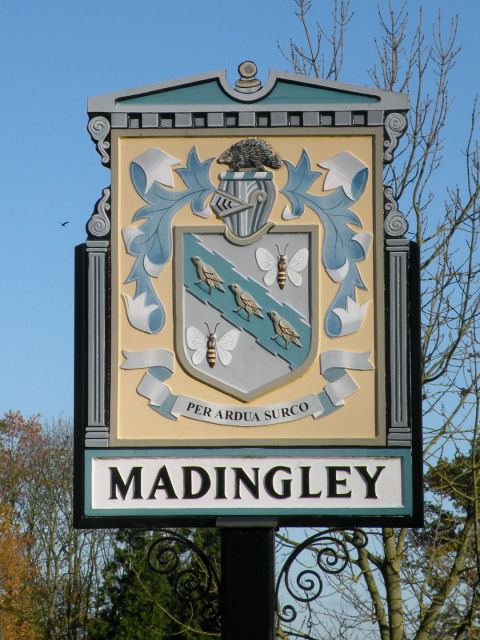
Madingley village sign, Cambridgeshire.

Master of Studies (MSt) degrees at PACE are usually undertaken over two years. The abbreviation MSt is used at the University of Cambridge (and the University of Oxford) to designate a 180-credit FHEQ level 7 Master's degree studied on a part-time basis (MPhil is used for equivalent courses studied on a full-time basis). PACE delivers a range of MSt courses in fields including Clinical Medicine, Medical Education, Artificial Intelligence and Creative Writing. PACE also acts as the Admitting Body for MSts offered by other University departments.

In the 2018–19 academic year, PACE led the introduction of Apprenticeships at Cambridge University to offer skill-based apprentice courses, giving students the opportunity to earn a postgraduate qualification in a select range of professional fields.

In 2020, PACE offered two new vocational master's degree courses: a master's degree in writing for performance, covering theatre, performance poetry, film, TV, radio and stand-up comedy, and the UK's first ever master's degree in the responsible use of artificial intelligence. The latter qualification is designed for technology makers and other professionals who wish to ensure their products cause no harm or augment bias and injustice such as sexism.

=== Short courses ===
Between 2014 and 2019, PACE supported The Queen Elizabeth Diamond Jubilee Trust to deliver the Queen's Young Leaders Programme. QYLP enabled young people from across the Commonwealth to further develop a range of community projects.

In September 2019, PACE launched a new series of short courses called ‘Super Tuesdays,’ which provided a three-hour introduction to a specific topic for adults of all ages, with no previous qualifications necessary.

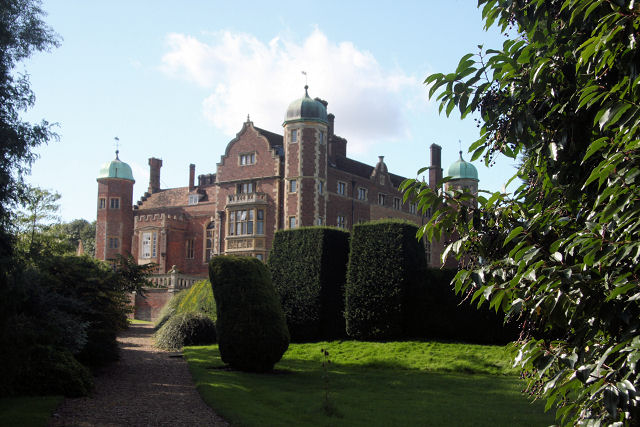
Madingley Hall in summer.

=== International summer programme ===
The University of Cambridge International Summer Programme provides an intensive one-to six-week learning experience with over 200 courses across eleven programmes. The programme attracts over 60 nationalities from ages 18 to over 80.

=== International pre-master's programme ===
The Cambridge International Pre-Master's Programme is a nine-month full-time programme for students who want to prepare for study at master's degree level at an English speaking university. The course aims to develop students’ abilities in research methods and practices and understanding of emerging themes in business management or engineering.

== Students ==
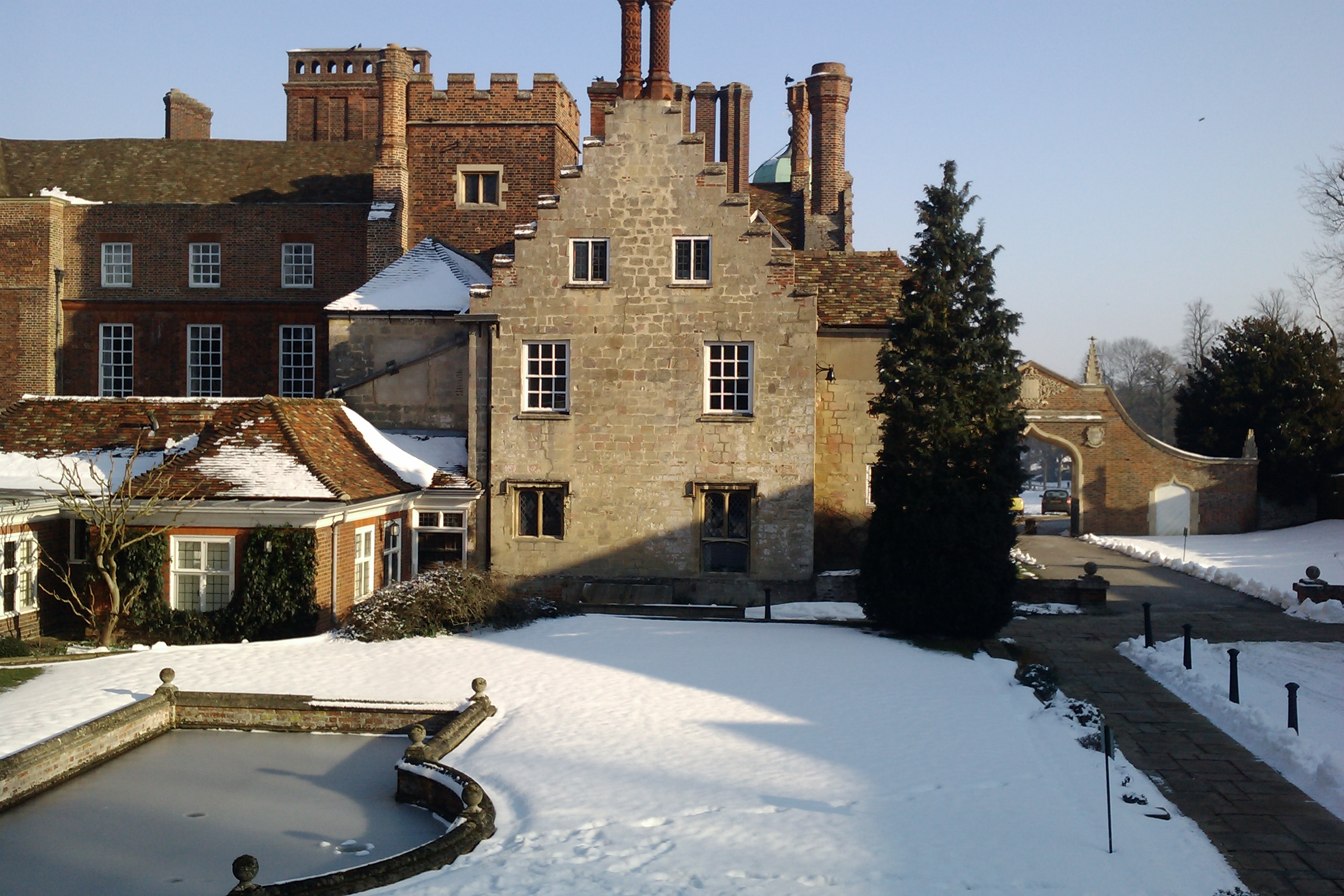
Madingley Hall in winter.

Throughout the 2019–20 academic year, 6,057 adult students enrolled on courses at PACE and a further 2,151 adults attended both virtual and in-person events.

In the summer of 2020, PACE announced it was launching a £1 million bursary programme to help adults hit hardest by the COVID-19 pandemic. As part of the programme, the institute offered 1,000 bursaries, each worth £1,000, to go towards tuition fees for more than 30 part-time courses. To support postgraduate students who studied during the COVID-19 pandemic, PACE launched another bursary scheme in February 2021. The bursary provides 100 University of Cambridge students a contribution of £2,100 towards the cost of a selection of PACE undergraduate certificates, diplomas and advanced diplomas.

=== Student life ===
Students studying for a qualification that is at least one academic year in length (starting with Undergraduate Certificates) receive a student card for full access to the Cambridge University Library and other University of Cambridge facilities.

Students completing award-bearing courses – including undergraduate and postgraduate Certificates, Diplomas, Advanced Diplomas, and master's degrees – at PACE enjoy University of Cambridge alumni status and associated benefits.

All Cambridge University students are entitled to free entry to the University Botanic Gardens on presentation of their University card. PACE students are also entitled to a 20% discount on books published by Cambridge University Press, which can be purchased at The Cambridge University Press Bookshop.

=== Alumni Status ===
Students who successfully complete degree-bearing programs of one academic year or longer at the undergraduate or postgraduate level are granted official alumni status of the University of Cambridge, along with all associated privileges.

== Notable people ==
=== Academics ===
- Gillian Carr, archaeologist specialising in the Holocaust, conflict archaeology, Iron Age and the Romans
- T. S. Eliot delivered series of extramural lectures at University of Cambridge
- E. M. Forster delivered his first series of extramural lectures at University of Cambridge in 1903 between writing A Room with a View.
- Dr. Rosemary Horrox, is an affiliated lecturer of history at PACE.
- George Mallory lectured at PACE in 1923 (then known as the Board of Extra-Mural Studies), before taking leave to climb Mount Everest in 1924.
- Caroline Malone, archaeologist and historian
- Dr. Chris Smith, a British consultant virologist and founder of The Naked Scientists science radio programme and podcast, is employed by PACE as a Public Understanding of Science Fellow.
- Natasha Pulley, a British author.
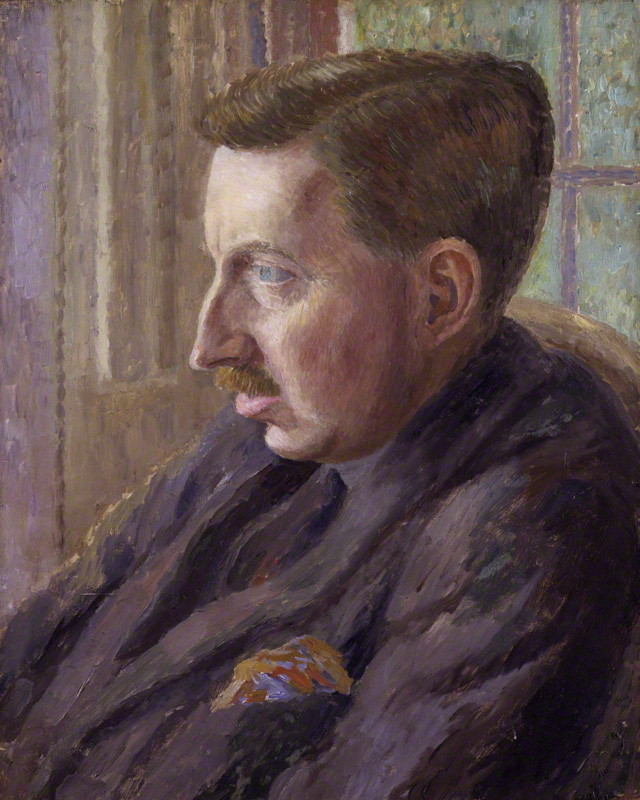
During 1903–1910 E. M. Forster lectured for Cambridge University's Department of Extramural Studies (PACE).

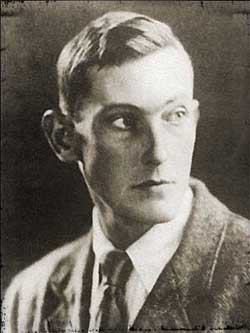
In 1923 George Mallory took a job as lecturer with Professional and Continuing Education.

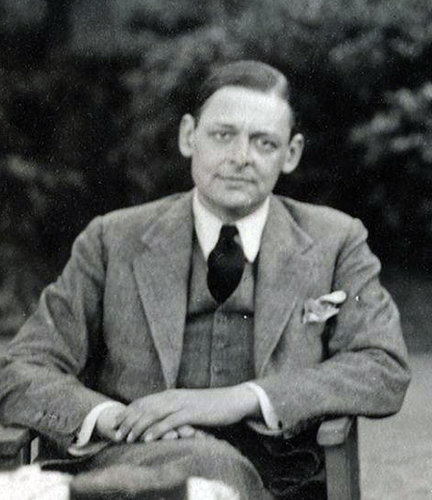
T. S. Eliot delivered series of extramural lectures at University of Cambridge

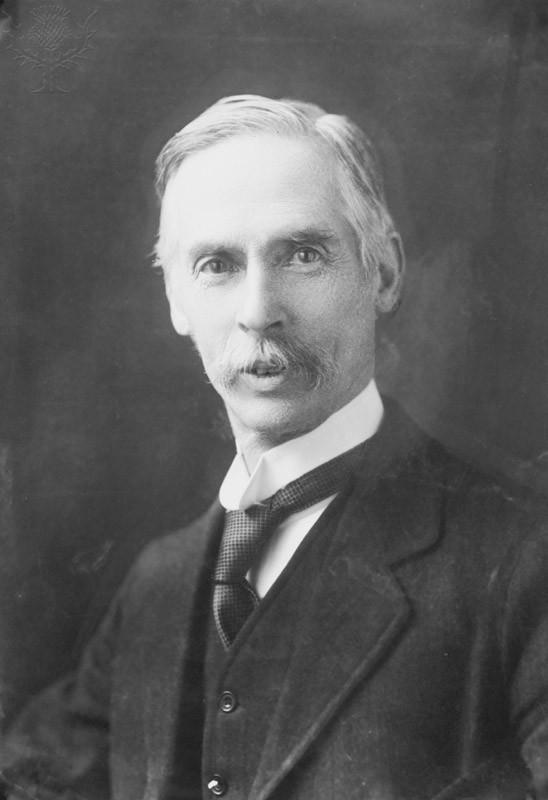
J. A. Hobson attended courses in political economy offered by the Cambridge board of Extra-Mural Studies.

=== Alumni ===
- J. A. Hobson, English economist social scientist.
- Sara Collins, author of The Confessions of Frannie Langton.
- Annabel Steadman, author of the Skandar and the Unicorn Thief book series.
- Sarah Sultoon, author of The Source.
- Souhardya De, an Indian commentator and writer.

== Supervision by university ==
The work of PACE is governed by the general board of the University of Cambridge, through a management committee and the institute's lecturers used to be appointed by the university. All award-bearing courses receive a University of Cambridge qualification, which are part of the UK's Credit Accumulation and Transfer Scheme (CATS). Unlike the equivalent Department for Continuing Education, University of Oxford, award-bearing graduates of the PACE at Cambridge are accorded full alumni status at the University of Cambridge.

== See also ==
- Oxford Lifelong Learning
