= The Cambridge World Prehistory =

The Cambridge World Prehistory, edited by Colin Renfrew and Paul G. Bahn, was published in three volumes by Cambridge University Press in 2014. According to the editors, the work places "equal emphasis on archaeology, language, and genetics" in the study of prehistory. Its 102 contributors come from 22 countries.

== Volumes ==
1. Africa, South and Southeast Asia and the Pacific
2. East Asia and the Americas
3. West and Central Asia and Europe

== Reception ==
Chris Scarre rated the work highly.
