= Disney Professor of Archaeology =

Endowed chair in archaeology

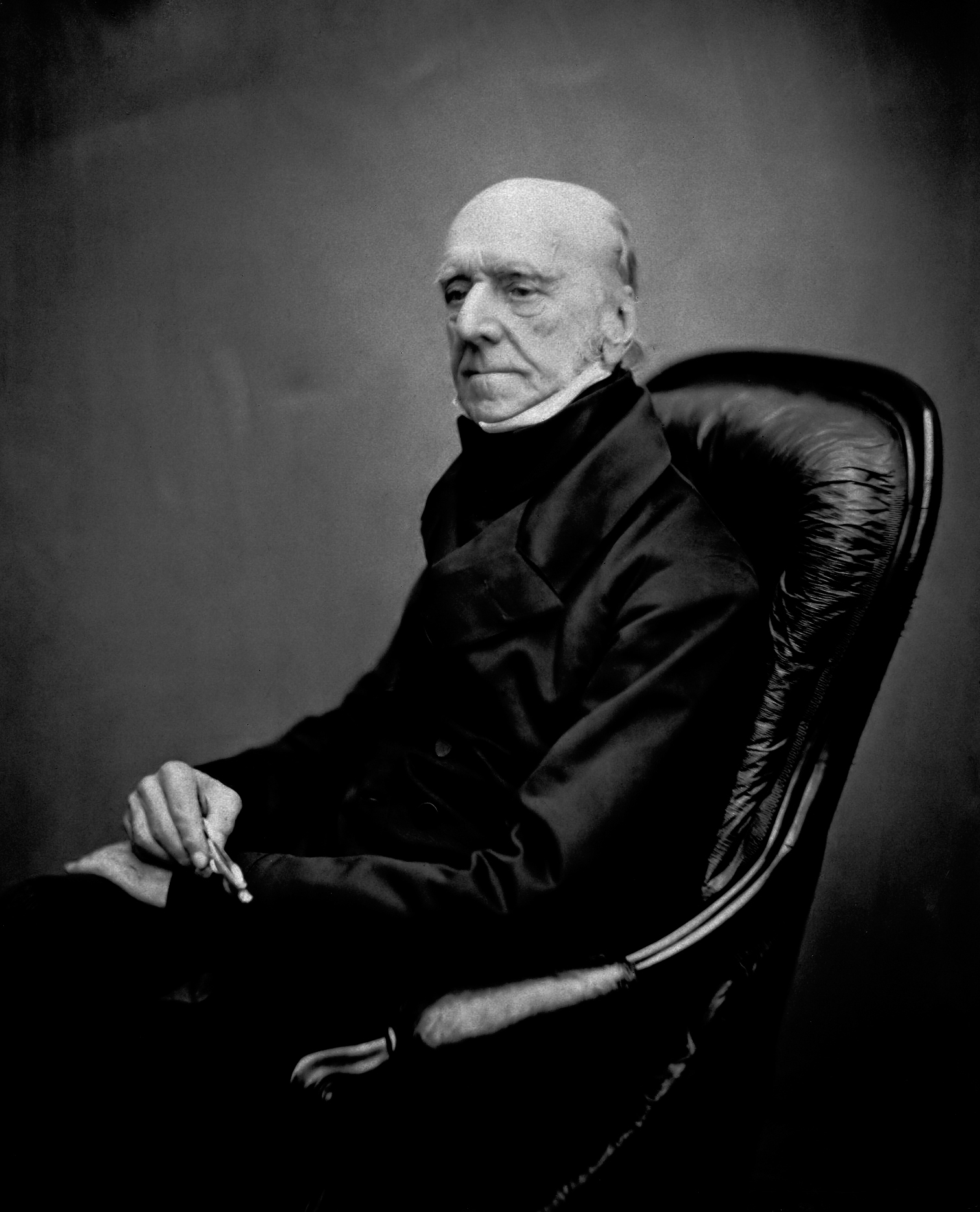
John Disney c. 1854-65

The Disney Professorship of Archaeology is an endowed chair in archaeology at the University of Cambridge. It was endowed by English barrister and antiquarian John Disney in 1851 with a donation of £1,000. He arranged for a further £3,500 bequest upon his death in 1857.

As of 2022 Disney Professors have also served as the Directors of the McDonald Institute for Archaeological Research, which was founded in 1990.

== List of Disney Professors of Archaeology ==
- 1851–1865 John Howard Marsden
- 1865–1879 Churchill Babington
- 1879–1887 Percy Gardner
- 1887–1892 George Forrest Browne
- 1892–1926 William Ridgeway
- 1926–1938 Ellis Minns
- 1939–1952 Dorothy Garrod
- 1952–1974 Grahame Clark
- 1974–1981 Glyn Daniel
- 1981–2004 Colin Renfrew
- 2004–2014 Graeme Barker
- 2014– Cyprian Broodbank

== See also ==
- List of professorships at the University of Cambridge
