= George Nickson =

Anglican bishop

George Nickson (9 May 1864 – 23 February 1949) was an Anglican bishop.

Nickson was born on 9 May 1864 and educated at Trinity College, Dublin and Corpus Christi College, Cambridge. He was ordained in 1889. His first post was as a curate at Holy Trinity, Cambridge, after which he was successively Vicar of St Benedict, Cambridge, St John the Divine Fairfield, Liverpool and St Andrew's Southport before being appointed Rural Dean of West Derby in 1905. In 1906 he became the first Suffragan Bishop of Jarrow. In 1911, he was nominated for translation to the post of Bishop of Southwark but a breakdown led to him withdrawing his acceptance of the offer. After his recovery, he was appointed to the see of Bristol, and was enthroned just before War was declared in August 1914.

He was one of the most fervent and outspoken supporters of British participation in the War. He was appalled at Germany's aggression and its harsh treatment of Belgian and French civilians. He wrote:

'...this war is spiritual in character. It is Christianity against a spirit which surely is akin to what is meant by Anti-Christ'

He urged his clergymen to:

'...do all they can to encourage recruiting...it shames one to read of the vast crowds of able-bodied young men who still flock to the football matches'

He vehemently opposed pacifism. Christianity could never be 'a dormant force in the presence of wrong... We are up against the forces of evil and a spirit leased from hell'

In 1919, he praised God for victory and hoped that the experience of War would result in better housing and wages and a more equitable distribution of wealth. By the time he retired in 1933, such ambitions had not been realised as he had hoped. He died on 23 February 1949, aged 84.

Religious titles
Preceded by Inaugural appointment	Bishop of Jarrow; 1906–1914	Succeeded by John Nathaniel Quirk
Preceded by George Forrest Browne	Bishop of Bristol; 1914–1933	Succeeded by Clifford Woodward
