= Sword of Stalingrad =

King George VI's storic sword of the United Kingdom

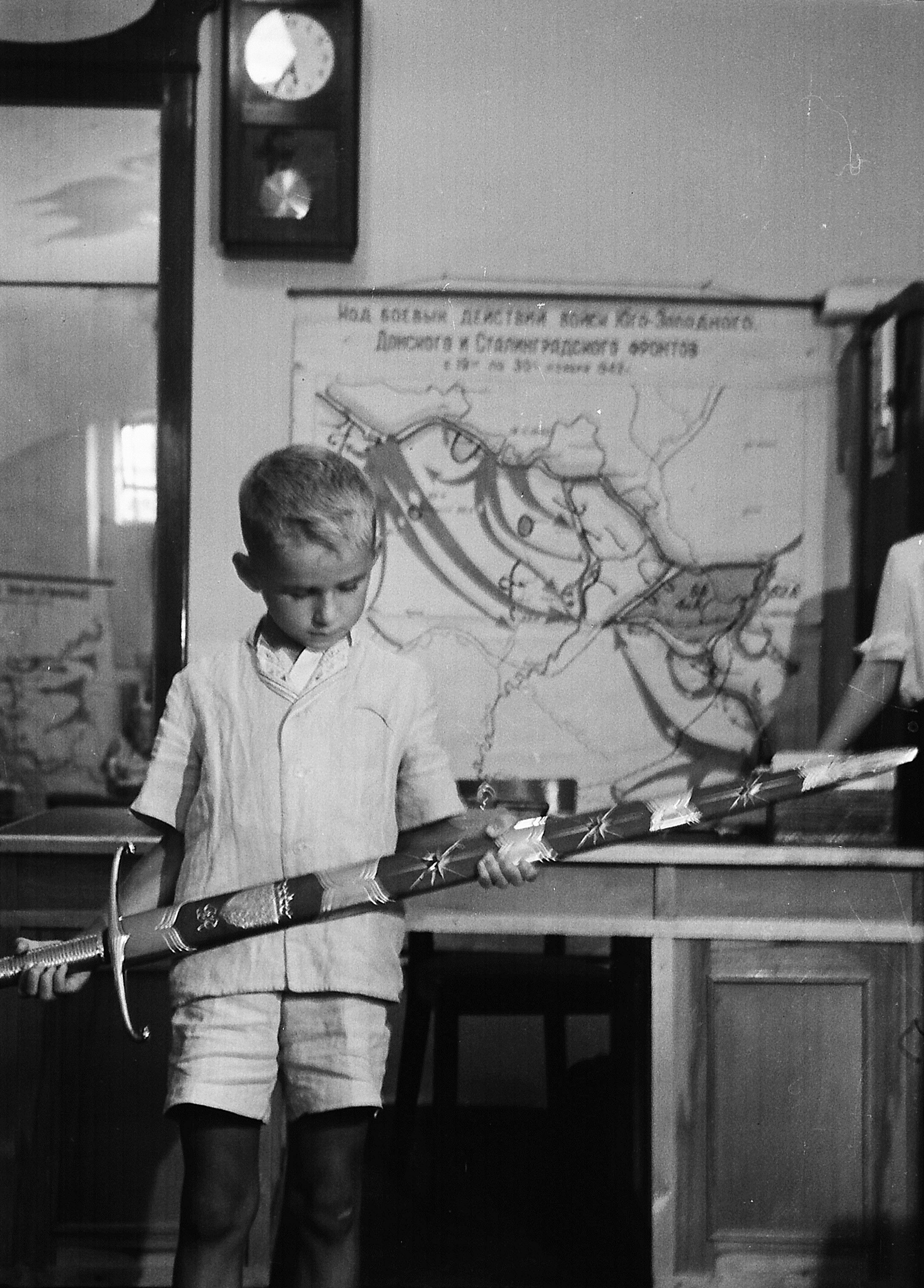
A boy inspects the Sword of Stalingrad in the Battle of Stalingrad Museum, 1953.

The Sword of Stalingrad (Russian: Меч Сталингра́да, romanized: Mech Stalingráda) is a bejewelled ceremonial longsword specially forged and inscribed by command of King George VI of the United Kingdom as a token of homage from the British people to the Soviet defenders of the city during the Battle of Stalingrad. On 29 November 1943, it was presented to Marshal Joseph Stalin by British Prime Minister Winston Churchill at a ceremony during the Tehran Conference, in the presence of President Franklin D. Roosevelt and an honour guard.

== Description ==
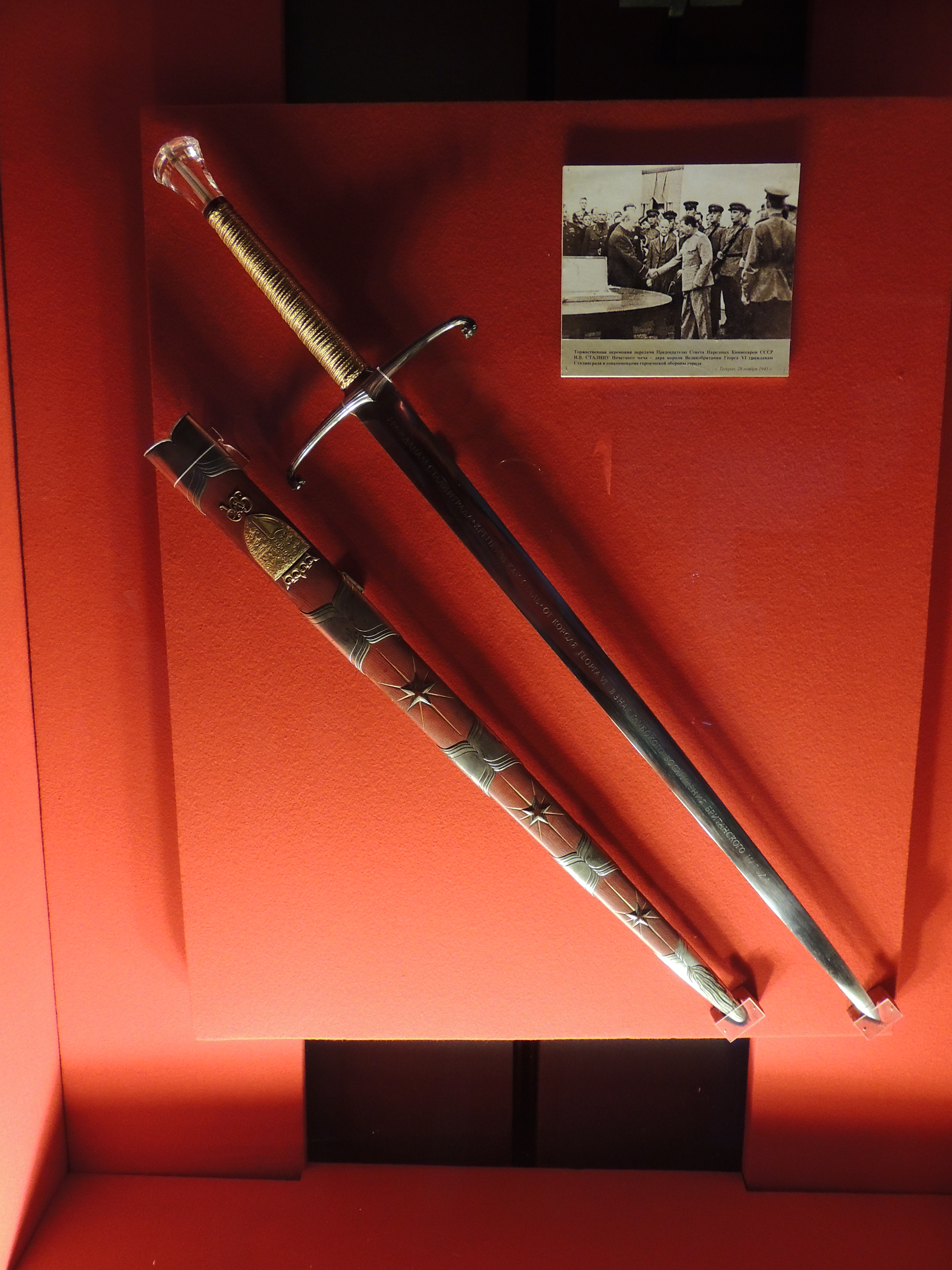
The sword in 2016

The sword is a double-edged, two-handed longsword, approximately 4-foot (1.2 m) long, with a solid-silver crossguard. The acid-etched inscription in Russian and English reads:

ГРАЖДАНАМ СТАЛИНГРАДА • КРЕПКИМ КАК СТАЛЬ • ОТ КОРОЛЯ ГЕОРГА VI • В ЗНАК ГЛУБОКОГО ВОСХИЩЕНИЯ БРИТАНСКОГО НАРОДА (Note: Romanized: Grazhdanam Stalingrada • Krepkim kak stal' • Ot Korolya Georga VI • V znak glubokogo voskhishcheniya Britanskogo naroda, literally "To The Citizens Of Stalingrad • Strong As Steel • From King George VI • As a Sign of the Deep Admiration of the British Nation.")
TO THE STEEL-HEARTED CITIZENS OF STALINGRAD • THE GIFT OF KING GEORGE VI • IN TOKEN OF THE HOMAGE OF THE BRITISH PEOPLE

The hand grip is bound in 18 carat gold wire and has a pommel of rock crystal with a gold rose of England. Each end of the 10-inch (25 cm) crossguard is fashioned in the likeness of the head of a leopard and finished with parcel gilt.

The 36-inch (91 cm) double-edged blade is lenticular in cross section and hand-forged out of the finest Sheffield steel. The scabbard was made from Persian lamb skin dyed crimson, although some sources suggest it was of Morocco leather. It is decorated with the Royal arms, the Crown and Cypher in silver gilt with five silver mounts and three rubies mounted on golden stars.

In its time it was celebrated as one of the last masterpieces in swordmaking craftsmanship from the modern age.

== Manufacture ==
The original design was by R. M. Y. Gleadowe, a University of Oxford fine arts don, and approved by the King. A commission of nine expert craftsmen from Goldsmiths' Hall supervised the execution of the works. The Russian wording was cleared by Sir Ellis Hovell Minns, a Slavonic iconographer and the President of Pembroke College, Cambridge.

The Wilkinson Sword Company was the fabricator, with the principal craftsmen being swordsmiths Tom Beasley and Sid Rouse, the calligrapher M. C. Oliver and silversmith Corp. Leslie G. Durbin from the Royal Air Force. The steel for the blade came from Sanderson Brothers and Newbould of Sheffield. The project took about three months to complete.

== Presentation ==
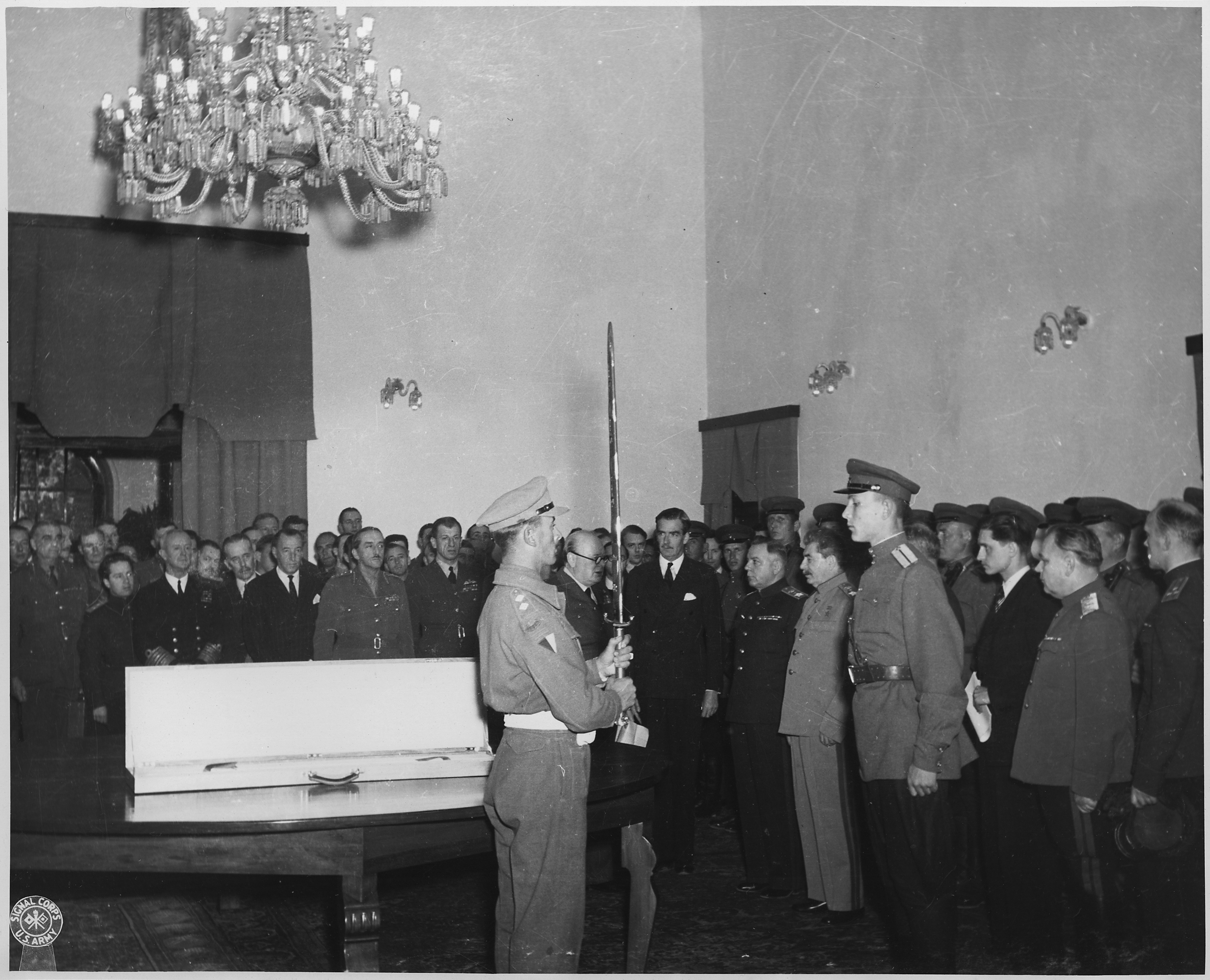
The presentation of the Sword of Stalingrad at the Tehran Conference

The official presentation was made while the Big Three wartime leaders were meeting in the Soviet embassy at the November 1943 Tehran Conference, where the final plans for Operation Overlord were being settled.

After a three-hour delay, the principals and their delegations gathered in the large conference room of the embassy with a British and Soviet honour guard lining either side of the hall. Winston Churchill entered wearing his blue Royal Air Force air commodore's uniform, and a Soviet military band played "God Save the King" and "The Internationale". Churchill took the sword from a British lieutenant and turning to Joseph Stalin declared, "I am commanded to present this sword of honour as a token of homage of the British people". Stalin kissed the scabbard and quietly thanked the British. He then offered the sword for inspection to the seated Franklin Roosevelt, who drew the blade and held it aloft, saying, "Truly they had hearts of steel". (In Russian, Stalin's name approximates to "man of steel").

The sword was replaced in its scabbard by either Churchill or Stalin. At the end of the ceremony, Stalin unexpectedly handed it off to one of his oldest and most loyal comrades, Marshal Kliment Voroshilov. He seemed to have been taken by surprise and took it the wrong way up so that the sword slipped out and fell. Observers differ on whether it struck his foot, clattered onto the floor, or was caught in time to be returned to its scabbard with a deft move.

== In literature ==
The sword figures eponymously in Evelyn Waugh's Sword of Honour trilogy, in which Waugh contrasts the sword, symbol for him of the betrayal of eastern Europe to the atheist Stalin, with the sword of honour of the crusading ancestor of the central character of the trilogy, Guy Crouchback.

== Disposition ==
Before its presentation, the sword was exhibited around the United Kingdom as a religious icon, including at Westminster Abbey, which formed a pivotal scene in Evelyn Waugh's wartime trilogy Sword of Honour.

The original is displayed at the Battle of Stalingrad Museum in Volgograd. During the Cold War it returned to Britain for temporary exhibitions on at least three occasions.
