= Ellis Minns =

British academic and archaeologist (1874–1953)

Sir Ellis Hovell Minns, FBA (16 July 1874 – 13 June 1953) was a British academic and archaeologist whose studies focused on Eastern Europe.

Educated at Charterhouse, he went to Pembroke College, Cambridge studying the Classical tripos including Slavonic and Russian. He lived briefly in Paris before moving to St Petersburg in 1898 to work in the library of the Imperial Archaeological Commission. Returning to Cambridge in 1901 he began lecturing in Classics.

In 1925 he gave the Sandars Lectures on bibliography, choosing as a topic the influence of materials and instruments upon writing.

In 1927, he was appointed Disney Professor of Archaeology, a post he held until 1938. He wrote widely with books including Scythians and Greeks (1913) and The Art of the Northern Nomads (1944). He was an authority on Slavonic icons and in 1943 cleared the Russian translation engraved on the ceremonial "Sword of Stalingrad" presented by the British people in homage to the defenders of the Russian city.

In the 1945 New Year Honours, Minns was appointed a Knight Bachelor, and thereby granted the title sir.

Academic offices
Preceded by Sir William Ridgeway	Disney Professor of Archaeology, Cambridge University; 1926 - 1938	Succeeded by Dorothy Garrod
