= William Ridgeway =

British archaeologist (1853–1926)

Sir William Ridgeway FBA FRAI
- Born: 6 August 1853; Ballydermot, King's County, Ireland
- Died: 12 August 1926 (aged 73)
- Occupation: Classical scholar

Academic background
- Education: Portarlington School; Trinity College, Dublin; Peterhouse, Cambridge; Gonville and Caius College, Cambridge

Sir William Ridgeway (6 August 1853 – 12 August 1926) was an Anglo-Irish classical scholar and the Disney Professor of Archaeology at the University of Cambridge.

== Early life and education ==
Ridgeway was born 6 August 1853, in Ballydermot in King's County, Ireland, the son of Rev. John Henry Ridgeway and Marianne Ridgeway. He was a direct descendant of one of Cromwell's settlers in Ireland. He was educated at Portarlington School and Trinity College, Dublin, then studied at Peterhouse, Cambridge before entering Gonville and Caius College, Cambridge, where he completed the Classical tripos in 1880.

In 1883, Ridgeway was elected Professor of Greek at Queen's College, Cork, then Disney Professor of Archaeology at the University of Cambridge in 1892. He also held tenure as Gifford lecturer in Religion at the University of Aberdeen from 1909 to 1911 from which was published The Evolution of Religions of Ancient Greece and Rome.

He contributed articles to the Encyclopedia Biblica (1903), Encyclopædia Britannica (1911) and wrote The Origin of Metallic Currency and Weight Standards (1892), and The Early Age of Greece (1901) which were significant works in Archaeology and Anthropology.

Ridgeway was President of the Royal Anthropological Institute between 1908 and 1910 and was instrumental in the foundation of the Cambridge school of Anthropology.

Ridgeway received an honorary Doctorate of Letters (D.Litt.) from the University of Dublin in June 1902. He was elected a Fellow of the British Association in 1904. For his research on horses he received in 1909 the Sc.D. of Cambridge. He was knighted in the 1919 Birthday Honours list.

In 1880, Ridgeway married Lucinda Maria Kate Samuels in Rathdown, County Dublin. Their daughter Lucy Marion Ridgeway (1882–1958) married economist John Archibald Venn in 1906.

== Selected publications ==
=== Articles ===
- The Greek trade-routes to Britain. 1899.
- The date of the first shaping of the Cuchulainn saga. Pub. for the British Academy by Henry Frowde. 1905.
- Who were the Romans?. In British academy, London. Proceedings, 1907-1908. British Academy. 1907.
- Minos the destroyer rather than the creator of the so-called 'Minoan' culture of Cnossus. Oxford University Press (H. Frowde). 1910.

=== Books ===
- Origin of metallic currency and weight standards. Origin of currency and weight standards. University Press. 1892.
- The early age of Greece. Vol. 1. The University press. 1901.
- The origin and influence of the thoroughbred horse. Cambridge biological series. University Press. 1905.
- The origin of tragedy, with special reference to the Greek tragedians. University of Cambridge Press. 1910.
- The dramas and dramatic dances of non-European races, in special reference to the origin of Greek drama. The University press. 1915.

== Arms ==
Coat of arms of William Ridgeway

Notes
Confirmed 31 May 1916 by George James Burtchaell, Deputy Ulster King of Arms.
Crest
A dromedary couchant Argent the pack bridle and trappings Sable garnished Or
Torse
Of the colours.
Escutcheon
Sable two wings conjoined Argent in chief a horse's head (Equus caballus Libieus Ridgewayi) cabossed in his Proper colours, Bay with a white star on the forehead.
Motto
Mihi Gravato Deus

Academic offices
Preceded by George Forrest Browne	Disney Professor of Archaeology, Cambridge University; 1892–1926	Succeeded by Sir Ellis Minns
