= Serra e Junceira =

- Civil parish
- Location in Portugal
- Coordinates: 39.60°N 8.30°W
- Country: Portugal
- Region: Oeste e Vale do Tejo
- Intermunic. comm.: Médio Tejo
- District: Santarém
- Municipality: Tomar

Area
  - Total: 46.57 km^{2} (17.98 sq mi)

Population (2011)
  - Total: 2,080
  - Density: 44.7/km^{2} (116/sq mi)
- Time zone: UTC+00:00 (WET)
  - Summer (DST): UTC+01:00 (WEST)

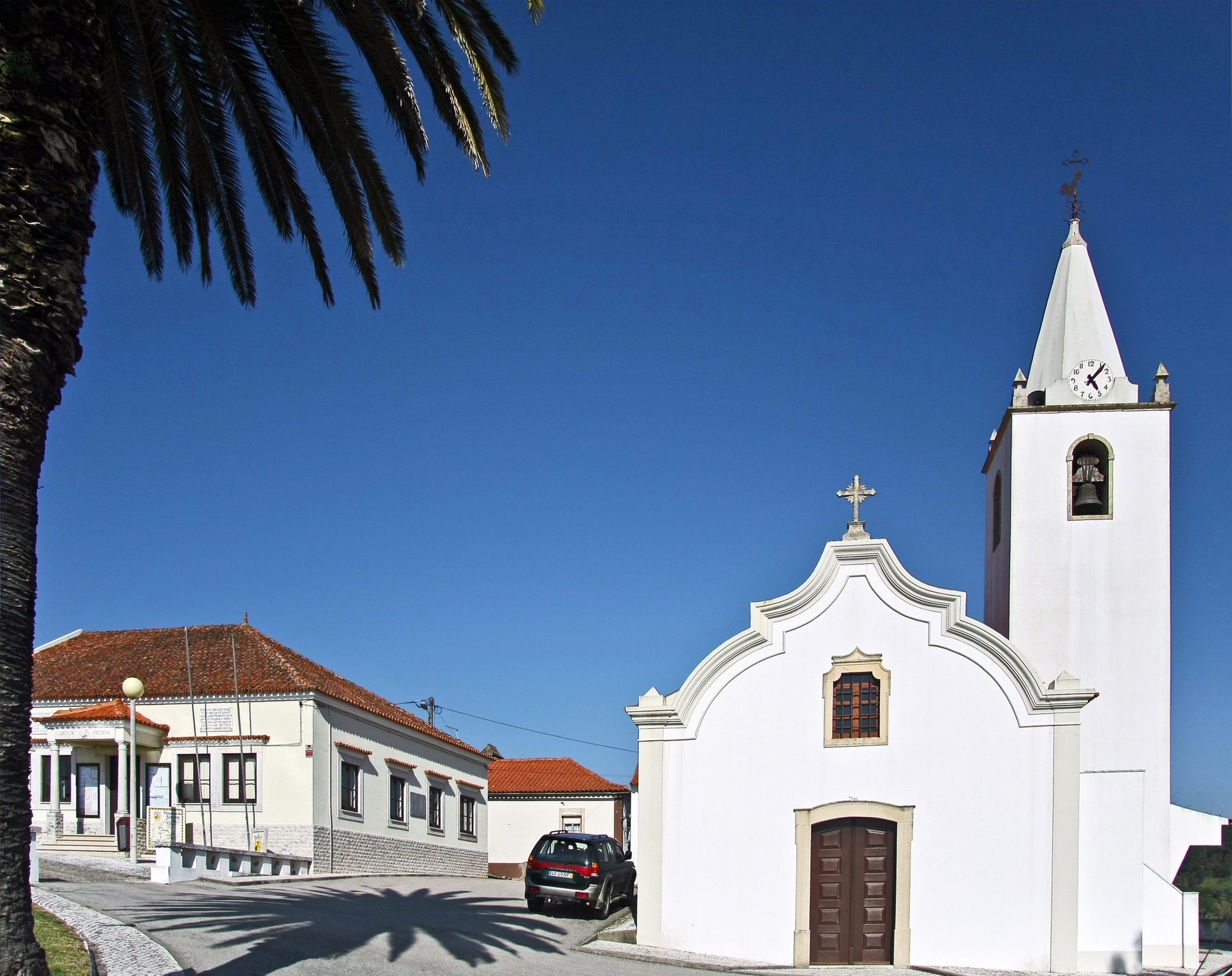
Igreja Matriz de Junceira

Serra e Junceira is a civil parish in the municipality of Tomar, Portugal. It was formed in 2013 by the merger of the former parishes Serra and Junceira. The population in 2011 was 2,080, in an area of 46.57 km².

The parish contains the important prehistorical site of the Anta do Vale da Laje, a megalithic tomb. Items found during excavations provide the first evidence in Portugal of milk and dairy product consumption during the late 4th/early 3rd millennia BCE.
