= Anta do Vale da Laje =

Megalithic tomb in Santarém District, Portugal

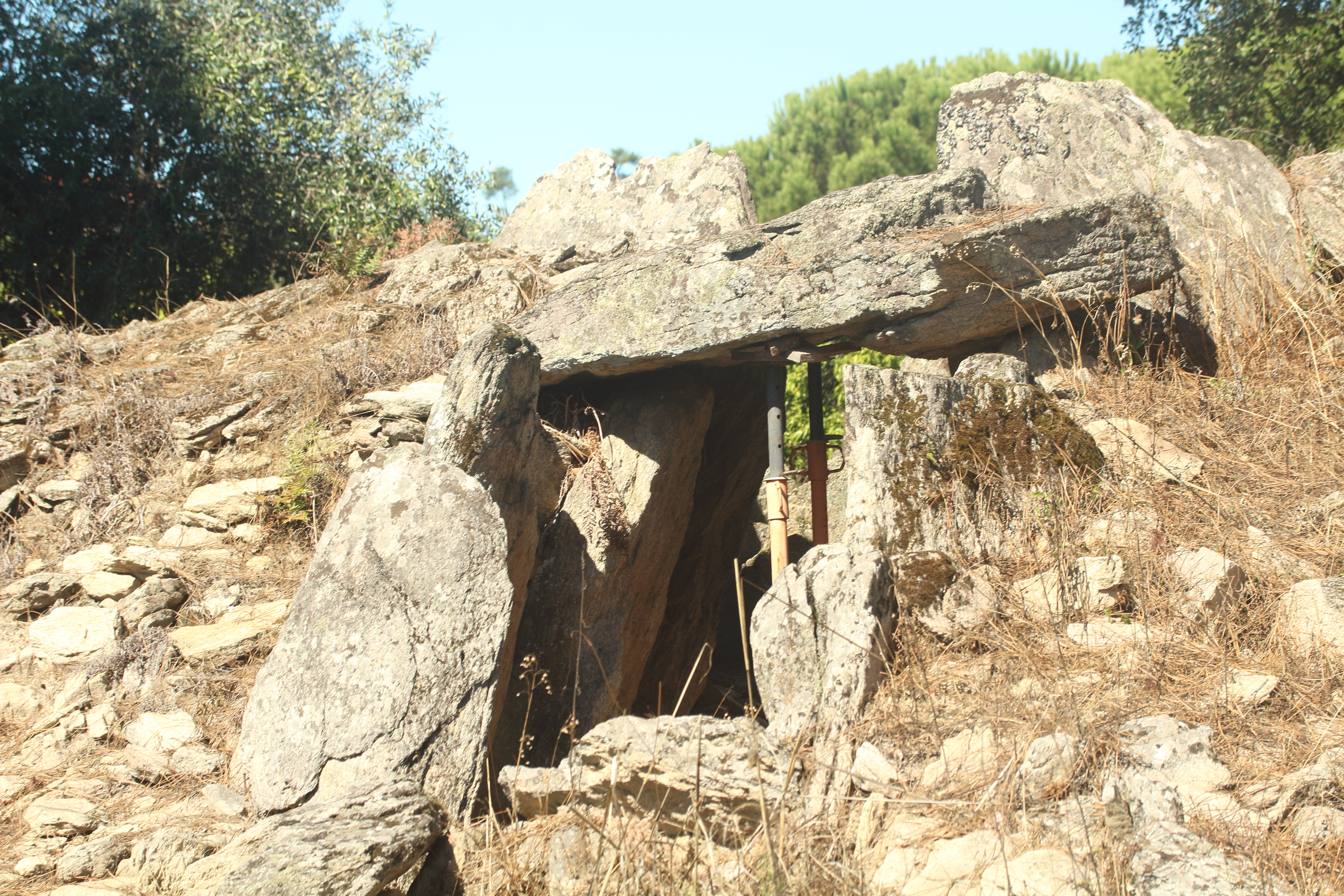
- Interactive map of Anta do Vale da Laje
- 39°33′23″N 8°18′08″W
- Type: Dolmen
- Periods: Neolithic, reused during the Bronze Age
- Location: Tomar, Santarém District, Portugal

History
- Built: c. 5000 BCE

Site notes
- Elevation: 160 m (520 ft)
- Length: 5.8 m (19 ft)
- Excavation dates: 1992–; 2017
- Discovered: 1990
- Condition: Semi-conserved
- Public access: Yes

The Anta do Vale da Laje is a prehistoric dolmen or burial tomb, located in the parish of Serra e Junceira within the municipality of Tomar in the Santarém District of Portugal. It is believed to have been part of a larger complex of five dolmens, the other four having since disappeared, which is why it is sometimes referred to as Anta 1 of the Vale da Laje. Excavations have found the first evidence in Portugal of milk and dairy product consumption during the late 4th/early 3rd millennia BCE.

== Description ==
This megalithic monument is believed to be the oldest known dolmen found north of the Tagus River. It stands on a hill, approximately 160 metres above sea level, on the bank of an artificial dam, about 10 km south-east of Tomar. Its pentagonal burial chamber is formed by five large orthostats, each over 2.5 metres high, and is approached by a short and narrow access corridor flanked by several pillars that were covered by two large roof slabs or capstones, of which only one remains. The corridor faces east and is slightly off-centre from the chamber. The stones used were sourced from a gneiss outcrop about 100 metres away from the monument.

The tomb was originally surrounded by a circle of slabs approximately 5 metres in diameter. From this circle were constructed ramps of smaller stones, with the entire structure then being covered by an oval earthen mound or tumulus, which had a diameter of 9–10 metres. In front of it, a platform of fine stones was built, upon which a small circular altar was erected. The reasons for the construction of this altar remain unknown. Later, a new circle was built around it consisting of small slabs interspersed with large quartz and quartzite pebbles, some from the nearby Zêzere Riverbed. The reflection of the sun on these pebbles would have made the monument stand out from a distance.

== Excavations ==
The anta was discovered in 1990 and several excavations have been carried out since the early 1990s. These included work in 2017 by a Portuguese-British team, involving the Polytechnic Institute of Tomar (IPT), the Instituto Terra e Memória of Mação, and the University of Durham from England. It was co-ordinated by Luiz Oosterbeek (IPT) and Chris Scarre of Durham University. Remains of about 90 bodies were found and these were accompanied by decorated schist plaques, bell-shaped pottery, a pendant, microliths, a polished axe, pottery, arrowheads, and other items. Many of these can now be seen at Centre for Prehistory of the IPT. The excavations and analysis carried out have not only have revealed much about the site's construction and use, but also about the food consumption of the time.

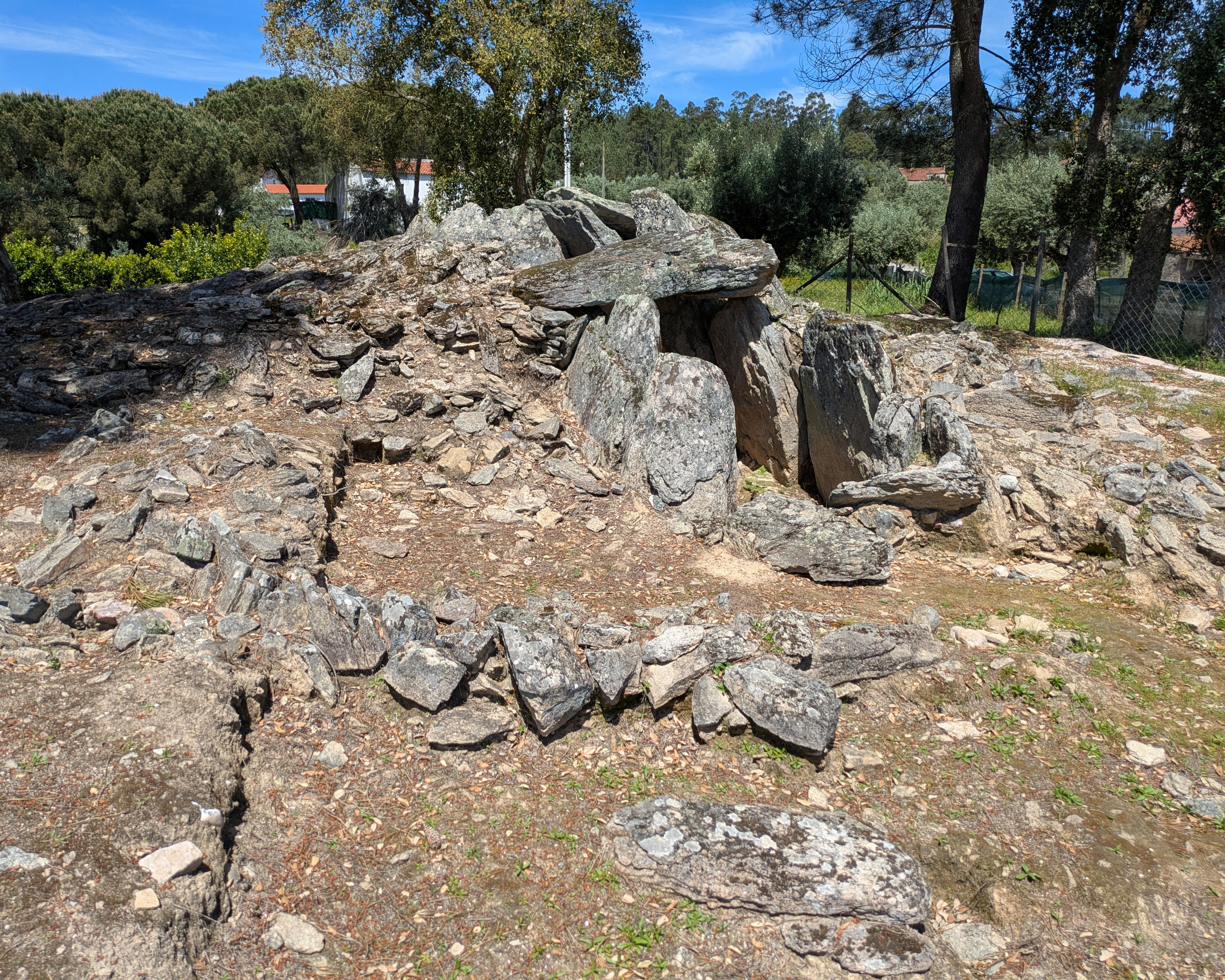
A side view of the dolmen

Four archaeological layers were identified during the excavations. The bottom layer revealed no archaeological finds, while the top layer was a disturbed layer, containing remains dating from the Copper Age until recently. The archaeologists in 2017 focussed on the middle two layers. The lower of these was the phase when the monument was built, while the higher was the period of most intense use. On the basis of the excavated material, the two layers represent a prolonged period of time, spanning over the later Neolithic and possibly the beginning of the Copper Age. Radiocarbon dating was used to provide an exact chronological determination. The site eventually fell into disuse, but appears to have again been used for burials during the Bronze Age, without any significant change to the structure.

Excavations in 1992 produced 2246 highly fragmented pottery units. Four general categories of container made of pottery were identified: dishes, which were conical, carinated, or hemispherical, and shallow plates; bowls of various shapes, some of which were used for cooking; jars, often featuring necks and handles, which were likely to have been used for storage and transportation; and closed globular pots that possibly served as lamps. Study of these fragments confirmed the presence of animal fats from both ruminant and non-ruminant animals, as well as dairy fats. While the presence of domesticated sheep, goats and cattle in Iberia during the late 4th/early 3rd millennia BCE had been well established, the excavations of the Anta do Vale da Laje also provided the first direct evidence of the consumption of milk and dairy products in Portugal at that time.

== Classification ==
Some restoration work was carried out in 2014. However, despite the dolmen's importance, it has yet to be officially classified. As a consequence, construction of houses has continued up to the fence around the site. Following the 2017–2020 excavations, the procedure for classification began on 16 July 2021.
