= Serra (Tomar) =

Coordinates: 39.600°N 8.300°W

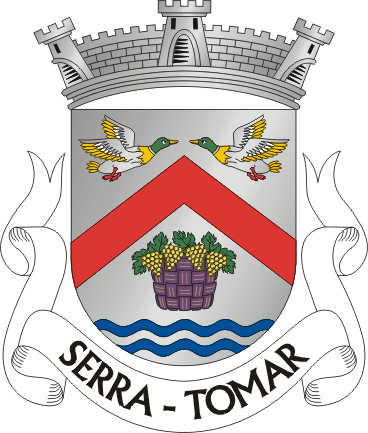
TMR serra logo

Serra is a former civil parish in the municipality of Tomar, Portugal. In 2013, the parish merged into the new parish Serra e Junceira. The population is 1299 (2001), the area 33.52 km^{2}, with a density of 38.8/km^{2}.
