= John Howard Marsden =

English cleric and academic (1803–1891)

John Howard Marsden (7 May 1803 – 24 January 1891) was an English cleric and academic. He was an antiquarian and became in 1851 the first Disney Professor of Archaeology at the University of Cambridge.

== Life ==
The eldest son of William Marsden, curate of St. George's Chapel, Wigan, and later vicar of Eccles, he was born at Wigan. He was admitted on 6 August 1817 to Manchester Grammar School, and was head scholar in 1822.

Marsden gained an exhibition from his school to St John's College, Cambridge, where he was elected a scholar on the Somerset foundation. In 1823 he won the Bell university scholarship. He graduated B.A. in 1826, with a first class in the classics tripos. He became M.A. in 1829, and B.D. in 1836.

Marsden was select preacher to the university in 1834, 1837, and 1847. He was Hulsean lecturer on divinity in 1843 and 1844, and was from 1851 to 1865 the first Disney Professor of archaeology. The Professor's duties were to give one lecture per year.

In 1840 Marsden was presented by his college to the rectory of Great Oakley, Essex, which he held for 49 years, resigning it in 1889 for health reasons. He also held for some years the rural deanery of Harwich. Having been elected canon residentiary of Manchester in 1858, he became rural dean of the deanery of Eccles, and he was one of the chaplains of James Prince Lee, first bishop of Manchester.

Marsden died at his residence, Grey Friars, Colchester, on 24 January 1891.

== Works ==
Marsden's works included:

- The Sacred Tree, a Tale of Hindostan, privately printed, London, 1840.
- Philomorus, a Brief Examination of the Latin Poems of Sir Thomas More, London, 1842.
- An Examination of certain Passages in Our Lord's Conversation with Nicodemus, eight Hulsean lectures, London, 1844.
- The Evils which have resulted at various times from a Misapprehension of Our Lord's Miracles, eight Hulsean discourses, London, 1845.
- College Life in the Reign of James I, based on the autobiography of Sir Symonds D'Ewes, London, 1851.
- Two Introductory Lectures upon Archaeology, delivered in the University of Cambridge, Cambridge, 1852.
- A Descriptive Sketch of the Collection of Works of Ancient Greek and Roman Art at Felix Hall, in "Transactions of the Essex Archaeological Society", 1863.
- Fasciculus, London, 1869, light verse.

Two works were connected to a claimed relationship with William Marsden (1754–1836), who had made John Howard Marsden his heir. The Rev. William Marsden, John Howard Marsden's father, and William Marsden (1754–1836) were both identified with the extended family "Marsden of Manchester and Chelmorton".

- History of the Gentlemen's Society at Spalding, London, 1849. William Marsden (1754–1836) was a member of the Spalding Gentlemen's Society.
- A Brief Memoir of the Life and Writings of Lieutenant-Colonel William Martin Leake, F.R.S., privately printed, London, 1864, on William Martin Leake. Leake had married Elizabeth, daughter of Sir Charles Wilkins. She was the widow of William Marsden (1754–1836).

In 1829 Marsden gained the Seatonian Prize, the subject of the poem being The Finding of Moses, Cambridge, 2nd edit. 1830. He published also sermons preached at Manchester Cathedral, Colchester, and Cambridge, 1835 to 1845.

== Family ==
Marsden married in 1840 Caroline, elder daughter of William Moore, D.D., prebendary of Lincoln. They had three sons:

- William (1841–1925), army officer, married in 1873 Katharine Murray, daughter of B. Rigby Murray, of Parton.
- Maurice Howard (1843–1920), cleric, married in 1873 Frances Maria Simpson, daughter of the Rev. S. Simpson, of Lancaster.
- Reginald Godfrey (1845–1927), barrister, married 1874 Edrica Jane Cowling, daughter of John Cowling.

== Notes ==
Academic offices
Preceded by Inaugural appointment	Disney Professor of Archaeology, Cambridge University; 1851 - 1865	Succeeded by Churchill Babington
