= Rebecca Lingwood =

British fluid dynamics researcher

- Education: University of Cambridge (BS, PhD)
- Awards: FEng (2019)
- Scientific career
- Fields: Fluid dynamics
- Workplaces: Lancaster University; University of Oxford; University of Cambridge; Queen Mary University of London; Brunel University London
- Website: https://www.lancaster.ac.uk/leadership/

Rebecca Julie Lingwood FREng FIMechE FRAeS (born August 1970) is the Deputy Vice-Chancellor of Lancaster University. She was previously Provost and Professor of Fluid Dynamics at Brunel University London. She holds an affiliate position at KTH Royal Institute of Technology. Lingwood was elected a Fellow of the Royal Academy of Engineering in 2019.

== Early life and education ==
Lingwood studied engineering at the University of Cambridge and graduated in 1992. She was a member of Sidney Sussex College. She remained there for a doctoral degree (completed in 1995) in fluid dynamics before starting a Royal Society Dorothy Hodgkin Fellowship. From 2004, Lingwood was a research engineer and aerospace manager at the Begbroke Science Park.

== Research and career ==
Lingwood joined the University of Oxford as Director of Continuing Professional Development. She spent six years at Oxford before moving to the University of Cambridge as Director of the Institute of Continuing Education in 2009. She was made a Fellow at Homerton College, Cambridge. Whilst at Cambridge she worked with the Cambridge University Health Partners to create a University Technical College. In 2015, Lingwood was made a Professor of Fluid Dynamics and Vice Principal for Education at Queen Mary University of London. In this capacity Lingwood was responsible for supporting the achievement of all students as well as developing staff excellence. Her research considers the transition from laminar to turbulent flow in complex fluids.

In 2018 Lingwood joined Brunel University London as Provost and Professor of Fluid Dynamics. She holds an affiliated chair at the KTH Royal Institute of Technology. Here she investigates the boundary layers that are induced by rotating surfaces. These include Kármán’s rotating-disk flow. She delivered the 2019 Royal Aeronautical Society Lanchester Lecture. She was the first woman to deliver this lecture.

In July 2024, Lingwood joined Lancaster University as Deputy Vice-Chancellor.

=== Academic service ===
Lingwood was made a Fellow of the Royal Academy of Engineering in 2019. She holds an honorary fellowship with Kellogg College, Oxford. Lingwood is a trustee of the Daphne Jackson Trust. In 2019 she announced that Brunel University London would join the Cabinet Office Open Innovation Partnership. She is working with the University of Bath to review the effectiveness of the university senate.

=== Selected publications ===
Her publications include;

- Lingwood, Rebecca J. (1995). "Absolute instability of the boundary layer on a rotating disk". Journal of Fluid Mechanics. 299: 17–33. Bibcode:1995JFM...299...17L. doi:10.1017/S0022112095003405. S2CID 123029627.
- Lingwood, Rebecca J. (2008). "The challenge of cancer control in Africa". Nature Reviews Cancer. 8 (5): 398–403. doi:10.1038/nrc2372. PMID 18385682.
- Lingwood, Rebecca J. (2009). "Absolute instability of the Ekman layer and related rotating flows". Journal of Fluid Mechanics. 331: 405–428. doi:10.1017/S0022112096004144. S2CID 122551507.

Lingwood serves on the editorial board of Philosophical Transactions of the Royal Society.
