= Cambridge Archaeological Journal =

Peer-reviewed academic journal

- Discipline: Archaeology
- Language: English
- Edited by: John Robb

Publication details
- History: 1991–present
- Publisher: Cambridge University Press on behalf of the McDonald Institute for Archaeological Research (United Kingdom)
- Frequency: Triannually

Standard abbreviations
- ISO 4: Camb. Archaeol. J.

Indexing
- ISSN: 0959-7743
- LCCN: 91658653

Links
- Journal homepage; Online access; Online archive

The Cambridge Archaeological Journal is a peer-reviewed academic journal for cognitive and symbolic archaeology published by Cambridge University Press on behalf of the McDonald Institute for Archaeological Research. It was established in 1991 and is published triannually. It includes major articles, shorter notes, book reviews, and review articles, especially those related to cognitive archaeology.

From 1990 to 2005 the editor was Chris Scarre (McDonald Institute). John Robb (University of Cambridge) was editor-in-chief as of 2026.

== Scope ==
The journal's focus is on the role and development of human intellectual abilities. It covers theoretical and descriptive archaeological research, ranging from art and iconography, burial and ritual, representations and symbolism, to the evolution of human cognition. The journal covers all eras and all areas, from the Lower Palaeolithic to Colonialism, and from the Pacific to Central Asia. Of note, figurine studies have been widely discussed in several surveys, but in particular in its 1996 feature "Can We Interpret Figurines?". The journal often publishes on Maya archaeology.
