= Robin Coningham =

British archaeologist and academic

Robin Andrew Evelyn Coningham, FSA, FRAS (born 2 December 1965) is a British archaeologist and academic, specialising in South Asian archaeology and archaeological ethics. He has been Professor of Early Medieval Archaeology since 2005 and UNESCO Chair in Archaeological Ethics and Practice in Cultural Heritage since 2014 at the University of Durham. From 1994 to 2005, he taught at the University of Bradford, rising to become Professor of South Asian Archaeology and Head of the Department of Archaeological Sciences.

== Academic career ==
Coningham led the excavation of the Maya Devi Temple in Lumbini, Nepal; an ancient Buddhist temple situated at the site traditionally considered the birthplace of Buddha.

In 1994, Coningham was elected a Fellow of the Royal Asiatic Society (FRAS). On 4 February 2016, he was elected a Fellow of the Society of Antiquaries of London (FSA).

Coningham is a member of the Antiquity Trust, which supports the publication of the archaeology journal Antiquity.

== Selected works ==
- Scarre, Geoffrey; Coningham, Robin, eds. (2013). Appropriating the Past: Philosophical Perspectives on the Practice of Archaeology. Cambridge: Cambridge University Press. ISBN 978-0521196062.
- Coningham, Robin; Young, Ruth (2015). The Archaeology of South Asia: From the Indus to Asoka, c.6500 BCE–200 CE. Cambridge: Cambridge University Press. ISBN 978-0521846974.
