= Reginald Gleadowe =

Reginald Gleadowe CVO (6 May 1888 – 9 October 1944) was a British teacher and designer who was Slade Professor of Fine Art at Oxford University.

== Career ==
Reginald Morier Yorke Gleadowe was born in London to G.E.Y. Gleadowe CMG, Controller-General of HM Treasury. Gleadowe was educated at Winchester College, New College, Oxford, and the Slade School of Art. He entered the Civil Service in 1912 as a clerk at the Admiralty. He became private secretary to the Secretary of the Admiralty. During World War I he served as a King's Messenger in the Eastern Mediterranean, with a commission as honorary captain in the Royal Marines.

After the war Gleadowe was assistant to the Director of the National Gallery 1919–23. He then became a master at Winchester College, responsible for art. He remained on the staff until his death but with many outside activities including Slade Professor of Fine Art at Oxford University 1928–33 (a visiting professorship). He exhibited at the Paris International Exhibition of 1937 and at the 1939 New York World's Fair. During World War II he was Admiralty representative on the War Artists' Advisory Committee. Among many other items he designed the Sword of Stalingrad.

Gleadowe was made a Commander of the Royal Victorian Order (CVO) in 1943.

He died in Cornwall in October 1944.

== Family ==
In 1921 Gleadowe married Cecil Rotton. They had twins born 9 September 1922: Richard Yorke Gleadowe was an officer in the Royal Navy and died in Malta on 12 July 1959; Tess, a musician, married the biologist and BBC chairman Michael Swann.

== Publications ==
- Ambrose McEvoy (Contemporary British Artists series), Ernest Benn, London, 1924
- Albert Rutherston (Contemporary British Artists series), Ernest Benn, London, 1925
- Oxford University and the fine arts : Inaugural lecture delivered before the University on 1 February 1928, Clarendon Press, Oxford, 1928
- British art : six broadcast talks, BBC, London, 1934

== Arms ==
Coat of arms of Reginald Gleadowe

Motto
Nilsine Labore
