= Graeme Barker =

British archaeologist

Graeme William Walter Barker, CBE, FBA (born 23 October 1946) is a British archaeologist, notable for his work on the Italian Bronze Age, the Roman occupation of Libya, and landscape archaeology. Having taught at the University of Sheffield and the University of Leicester, he was Disney Professor of Archaeology at the University of Cambridge from 2004 to 2014.

== Early life and education ==
Barker was born on 23 October 1946. He was educated at Alleyn's School, then a direct grant grammar school in Dulwich. He studied for the classical tripos at St John's College, Cambridge, graduating with a Bachelor of Arts (BA) degree; as per tradition, his BA was promoted to a Master of Arts (MA Cantab) degree. He remained at Cambridge to take his Doctor of Philosophy (PhD) degree, which he completed in 1973 with a doctoral thesis titled "Prehistoric economies and cultures in Central Italy.".

== Academic career ==
In 1972, Barker joined the University of Sheffield as a lecturer in prehistory and archaeology. He was promoted to senior lecturer in 1981, and was additionally Director of the British School at Rome from 1984.

In 1988, Barker was appointed Professor of Archaeology in the Department of Archaeology at the University of Leicester, which became the School of Archaeological Studies in 1990 and the School of Archaeology and Ancient History in 2001. Barker was elected to the Disney Professorship of Archaeology at the University of Cambridge in 2004, and is a fellow of St John's College, Cambridge. He retired from the Disney chair at the end of September 2014.

In April 2015, he and his team announced the discovery of neanderthal skeletons in the Shanidar Cave located north of Erbil.

Barker is a member of the Antiquity Trust, which supports the publication of the archaeology journal Antiquity.

== Honours ==
In 2005, Barker was, with Israel Finkelstein, joint winner of the Dan David Prize. He was elected Fellow of the British Academy (FBA) in 1999.

He was appointed Commander of the Order of the British Empire (CBE) in the 2015 New Year Honours for services to archaeology.

Academic offices
Preceded by Colin Renfrew	Disney Professor of Archaeology, Cambridge University; 2004 - 2014	Succeeded by Cyprian Broodbank
