= Simon Stoddart =

Simon Stoddart FSA
- Born: 8 November 1958 (age 67)
- Title: Professor of Prehistory
- Awards: Fellow of the Society of Antiquaries of London

Academic background
- Education: University of Oxford; University of Cambridge; University of Michigan

Academic work
- Discipline: Archaeology
- Sub-discipline: Iron Age Europe; Landscape archaeology; Mortuary ritual
- Institutions: Magdalene College, Cambridge; University of York; University of Bristol; Department of Archaeology, University of Cambridge; Gonville and Caius College, Cambridge; McDonald Institute for Archaeological Research
- Doctoral students: Gilly Carr

Simon Kenneth Fladgate Stoddart, FSA (born 8 November 1958) is a British archaeologist, prehistorian, and academic. He is Professor in Prehistory at the University of Cambridge, a fellow of Magdalene College, Cambridge, and the acting deputy director of the McDonald Institute for Archaeological Research.

Stoddart was editor of journal Antiquity, 2001–2002. He is a Fellow of the Society of Antiquaries of London, and a member of the Institute of Field Archaeologists.

== Early life and education ==
Stoddart was born in 8 November 1958. He was educated at Winchester College, then an all-boys public school (i.e. an independent boarding school) in Winchester, Hampshire. While at school he took part in the archaeological excavation of a Roman site at Lankhills outside of Winchester which was run buy schoolmaster Jock Macdonald. Amongst his other teachers was Peter Partner. He earned his BA (1980) in archaeology and anthropology and PhD (1987) from the University of Cambridge. In 1983, he earned his MA in anthropology from the University of Michigan. While a student at Cambridge he was a member of the University of Cambridge Archaeological Field Club (AFC). He currently serves as the Senior Treasurer of the AFC.

== Academic career ==
Stoddart began his academic career as a junior research fellow at Magdalene College, Cambridge, between 1986 and 1989. He then left Cambridge, and was a lecturer in archaeology at the University of York from 1988 to 1990 and at the University of Bristol from 1990 to 1994. He took a sabbatical from Bristol to be a charter fellow (i.e. visiting fellow) at Wolfson College, Oxford, for the 1992/93 academic year. He was promoted to senior lecturer in 1994.

In 1996, Stoddart returned to Cambridge University as a university lecturer in archaeology. He was also director of studies in archaeology at St Catharine's College, Cambridge from 1996 to 2000, and also at Gonville and Caius College, Cambridge, for the Michaelmas terms of 1996 to 1998. He was a college lecturer at Magdalene College, Cambridge from 1997 to 1998, and was elected a fellow of the college in 1998, an affiliation he retained through to retirement. Cambridge University promoted him to senior lecturer in 2000. He held the Balsdon Fellowship at the British School at Rome during the 2003/04 academic year, and was also a research associate professor at the University of Buffalo, SUNY in the United States. He served as college librarian at Magdalene College, Cambridge, from 2007 to 2010. The Cambridge University promoted him to reader in prehistory in 2013, and he was deputy director of the McDonald Institute for Archaeological Research from 2014 to 2017. He became Professor of Prehistory in 2021.

In addition to his university positions, he was deputy editor of the academic journal Antiquity from 1998 to 2000. He then served as its editor from 2001 to 2002.

On 5 May 1994, Stoddard was elected a Fellow of the Society of Antiquaries of London (FSA).

== Personal life ==
In 1983, Stoddard married Caroline Malone, a fellow archaeologist. She went on to become Professor of Prehistory at Queen's University, Belfast. Together they had two daughters.

== Selected publications ==
- Malone, Caroline; Stoddart, Simon; Bonanno, Anthony; Gouder, Tancred (1995), "Mortuary Ritual of 4th Millennium bc Malta: the Zebbug Period Chambered Tomb from the Brochtorff Circle at Xaghra (Gozo)", Proceedings of the Prehistoric Society, 61: 303–345, doi:10.1017/S0079497X0000311X, ISSN 0079-497X, S2CID 192949302
- Stoddart, Simon (2005), Power and place in Etruria, Cambridge University Press, ISBN 9780521380751
- Popa, Cătălin Nicolae; Stoddart, Simon (2012), Opening the Frontier: The Gubbio-Perugia Frontier in the Course of History, Oxbow Books, ISBN 9781782976783, OCLC 855738843
- Popa, Cătălin Nicolae; Stoddart, Simon (2014), Fingerprinting the Iron Age : approaches to identity in the European Iron Age : integrating South-Eastern Europe into the debate, Oxbow Books, ISBN 978-1782976783
