= Caroline Malone =

British academic and archaeologist (born 1957)

- Born: 1957 (age 68–69)
- Education: Murray Edwards College, University of Cambridge
- Occupations: Prehistorian, archaeologist
- Employer: Queen's University Belfast

Caroline Ann Tuke Malone (born 1957) is a British academic and archaeologist. She was Professor of Prehistory at Queen's University, Belfast from 2013 and is now emeritus professor.

== Education ==
Malone graduated with a Bachelor of Arts (BA) degree in archaeology and anthropology at the University of Cambridge in 1980 (promoted to MA (Cantab)), and was awarded a Doctor of Philosophy (PhD) degree in archaeology by Cambridge in 1986. Her doctoral thesis was titled "Exchange systems and style in the central Mediterranean".

== Career ==
She began her career as a curator at the Alexander Keiller Museum, Avebury from 1985 to 1987. She then worked as an Inspector of Ancient Monuments for English Heritage from 1987 to 1990. She moved into academia, and was a lecturer then senior lecturer at the University of Bristol from 1990 to 1997. In 1997, she returned to her alma mater, the University of Cambridge, as a Fellow of New Hall, Cambridge, and a tutor in archaeology at the Institute of Continuing Education. She was additionally made an affiliated lecturer of the Department of Archaeology in 1998. She was editor of Antiquity (2000–2002), Keeper of the Department of Prehistory and Early Europe at the British Museum (2000–2003), and senior tutor of Hughes Hall, Cambridge (2003–2007).

== Research ==
Her research interests include fieldwork in peninsular Italy (since 1983), Malta (since 1987), and Troina in Sicily (since 1997), and currently in Britain. Specific topics include archaeological theory and practice; Neolithic and Copper Age societies of Britain, Europe, Mediterranean, and Italy; island societies and island archaeology; landscape and settlement archaeology: cultural resource management: artefacts and technology: fieldwork and survey.

Malone headed a successful European Research Council bid for an Advanced Research Project entitled FRAGSUS which commenced in 2013. This project is a collaboration between the University of Malta, the University of Cambridge, Heritage Malta and Queen’s University Belfast. It investigates the environmental impact of early colonists in Malta, and excavated at the Neolithic temple sites of Ggantija, Santa Verna, Kordin III and Skorba as well as Tac Cawla and the Bronze Age site of In Nuffara in an attempt to explored chronology, economy and landscape.

== Personal life ==
Malone is married to Cambridge archaeologist Simon Stoddart, with whom she has directed fieldwork since 1983, and together they have two children.

== Select publications ==
- Megaliths in Malta. Orme dei Giganti. Stoddart, S. and C. Malone, eds., ed. B.C.a.B.L. Tusa S. 2009, European Commission. p. 23-34.
- Mortuary Customs in prehistoric Malta: excavations at the Brochtorff-Xaghra Circle, Gozo, 1987-1994. Malone, C. Stoddart, S, Trump, D, Bonanno, A., Gouder, T., and Pace, A.McDonald Monographs. 2009, Cambridge: McDonald Institute for Archaeological Research.
- Changing beliefs in the human body in prehistoric Malta 5000-1500 BC. Past Bodies, Stoddart, S.K.F. and C.A.T. Malone, ed. D.a.R. Boric, J. 2008, Berghahn: Oxford. p 19-28. .
- Malone, C., Metaphor and Maltese Art: explorations in the Temple Period. Journal of Mediterranean Archaeology, 2008. 21(1): p. 81-109.
- Extracting the Domestic from Indigenous Sicily. in Building Communities: House, settlement and society in the Aegean and beyond: Proceedings of the Cardiff Conference. Sturt, F., S. Stoddart, and C. Malone, Edited by: N. Fisher, Whitley, J. and Westgate, R, Editor. 2007, British School at Athens Studies. p 47-53.
- Structure, art and ritual in a Maltese Temple. Malone, C.In Barrowclough, D. And Malone, C. (eds) Cult in Context. 2007. Oxbow books, Oxford. 23-34.
- Malone, C., ed. Access and Visibility in prehistoric Malta. Recent Research and Developments in the Management of World Heritage Sites, ed. M. Pomeroy-Kellinger. Vol. 16. 2007, Oxford Archaeology Monographs, Occasional Papers Oxford. p. 15-25.
- Cult in Context: reconsidering Ritual in Archaeology. Barrowclough, D. and *Malone, C. eds. 2007, Oxbow: Oxford.
- Ashley, S., Ashley, S,. Bending, J,. Cook, G,. Corrado, A., *Malone, C., Pettitt, P,.Puglisi, D., Redhouse, D., *Stoddart, S. The resources of an upland community in the fourth millennium BC. Uplands of Sicily and Calabria., ed. M. Fitzjohn. Vol. 13. 2007, Accordia Research Centre, University of London. p. 59-80.
- Dolfini, A., C. Malone, and S. Stoddart, Searching for ritual in the Bronzo Finale: the example of Gubbio, in Studi di Protostoria in onore di Renato Peroni. 2006, All'Insegna del Giglio: Firenze: p. 663-665.
- Towards an island of mind? (2004), by Caroline Malone and Simon Stoddart, pp. 93–102 in: 'Explaining social change: Studies in honour of Colin Renfrew', edited by J. Cherry, C. Scarre, and S. Shennan, 240 pp, McDonald Institute, Cambridge, ISBN 978-1-902937-23-6
- Megaliths from Antiquity (2003), edited by Timothy Darvill and Caroline Malone, 386p, published by Antiquity, Cambridge, ISBN 978-0-9539762-2-5
- Stonehenge (Digging for the Past) (June 2002), by Caroline Malone, Kay Almere Read, and Nancy Stone Bernard, 48 pages, published by Oxford University Press, ISBN 978-0-19-514314-0
- Neolithic Britain And Ireland (October 2001), by Caroline Malone, 288 pages, 183 b/w figs, published by NPI Media Group, ISBN 978-0-7524-1442-3
- The articulation of disarticulation. preliminary thoughts on the Brochtorff Circle at Xaghra (Gozo) (1999), by Simon Stoddart, M. Wysocki, G. Burgess, G. Barber, C. Duhig, Caroline Malone, and G. Mann, pp. 94–105 in: 'The loved body's corruption: Archaeological contributions to the study of human mortality' edited by J. Downes and A. Pollard, published by Cruithne Press, Glasgow, ISBN 1-873448-06-6
- God of Goddess? The Temple Art of Ancient Malta (May 1999) by Caroline Malone, pp 148–163 in: 'Ancient Goddesses: The Myths and Evidence', edited by L. Goodison and C. Morris, jointly published by British Museum Press, London, and the University of Wisconsin Press, 224 pp, ISBN 978-0-299-16320-4
- The Conditions of Creativity for Prehistoric Maltese Art (1998), by Caroline Malone, and Simon Stoddart, pp 241–259 in 'Creativity in Human Evolution and Prehistory' edited by Steven Mithen, published by Routledge, ISBN 978-0-415-16096-4
- Territory, Time and State: The Archaeological Development of the Gubbio Basin (October 1994), edited by Simon Stoddart and Caroline Malone, 244 pp with 62 line diagrams, 9 half-tones, 21 tables and 36 maps, published by Cambridge University Press, ISBN 978-0-521-35568-1

Academic offices
Preceded by Christopher Chippindale	Editor of Antiquity; 1998–2002	Succeeded by Martin Carver
