= Geoffrey Scarre =

British philosopher

Geoffrey F. Scarre

Philosophical work
- Era: Contemporary philosophy
- Region: Western philosophy
- School: Utilitarianism
- Main interests: Ethics

Geoffrey Scarre is a moral philosopher and emeritus professor of philosophy at Durham University, having taught and published extensively in moral philosophy and applied ethics for more than three decades.

His research in recent years has focused on death and ageing, forgiveness, cultural-heritage ethics, and the ethical judgment of the past.

Until his retirement in 2021 he was a director of the Durham University Centre for the Ethics of Cultural Heritage.

== Published works ==
- Witchcraft and Magic in Sixteenth- and Seventeenth-Century Europe (Basingstoke: Macmillan, 1987; 2nd ed. (with John Callow), 2001
- Logic and Reality in the Philosophy of John Stuart Mill (Dordrecht: Kluwer, 1989)
- Utilitarianism (London: Routledge, 1996)
- After Evil: Responding to Wrongdoing (Aldershot: Continuum, 2004)
- Mill's On Liberty: A Reader's Guide (New York: Continuum, 2007)
- Death (Stocksfield: Acumen, 2007)
- On Courage (London: Routledge, 2010)
- Judging the Past: Ethics, History and Memory (Cham: Palgrave Macmillan, 2023)

=== Edited books ===
- Children, Parents and Politics (Cambridge: Cambridge University Press, 1989)
- Moral Philosophy and the Holocaust, with Eve Garrard (Aldershot: Ashgate, 2003)
- The Ethics of Archaeology: Philosophical Perspectives on Archaeological Practice, with Chris Scarre (Cambridge: Cambridge University Press, 2006)
- Appropriating the Past: Philosophical Perspectives on the Practice of Archaeology, with Robin Coningham (New York: Cambridge University Press, 2013)
- The Palgrave Handbook of the Philosophy of Aging (London: Palgrave Macmillan, 2016)
- Cultural Heritage, Ethics and Contemporary Migrations, with Cornelius Holtorf and Andreas Pantazatos (London: Routledge, 2019)

=== Journal papers ===
- 'Should we fear death?', European Journal of Philosophy, 5 (1997)
- 'Understanding the moral phenomenology of the Third Reich', Ethical Theory and Moral Practice, 1 (1998)
- 'On caring about one's posthumous reputation', American Philosophical Quarterly, 38 (2001)
- 'Archaeology and respect for the dead', Journal of Applied Philosophy, 20 (2003)
- 'Excusing the inexcusable? Moral responsibility and ideologically motivated wrongdoing', Journal of Social Philosophy, 36 (2005)
- 'Can there be a good death?' Journal of Evaluation in Clinical Practice, 18 (2012)
- 'The “constitutive thought” of regret,' International Journal of Philosophical Studies, 25 (2017)
- ‘Forgiveness and ageing.’ In Christopher Wareham (ed.), The Ethics of Ageing. (Cambridge: Cambridge University Press 2022)
- 'Killing swiftly: the effects of COVID-19 on the experience of the ageing.’ In Irene Gammell and Jason Wang (eds.), Creative Resilience and COVID-19: Figuring the Everyday in a Pandemic. (London: Routledge, 2022)
- 'Who is entitled to forgive? A Study of “Third-Party” and “Proxy” Forgiveness.' In Paula Satne and Krisanna Scheiter (eds.): Conflict and Resolution: The Ethics of Forgiveness, Revenge and Punishment. (Cham: Springer, 2022)
- Alkaline hydrolysis and respect for the dead: an ethical critique.’ Mortality, 2024
- ‘How to be a “good” collector: some ethical reflections on the private collecting of cultural heritage.’ International Journal of Cultural Property, 2024
