= Cyprian Broodbank =

British archaeologist and academic

Cyprian Broodbank FSA FBA
- Born: 26 December 1964 (age 61)
- Occupations: Archaeologist; Academic
- Title: Disney Professor of Archaeology
- Awards: Fellow of the Society of Antiquaries (2007); Wolfson History Prize (2014); Fellow of the British Academy (2015)

Academic background
- Education: University of Oxford; University of Bristol; University of Cambridge
- Thesis: This small world the great: an island archaeology of the early Cyclades (1995)

Academic work
- Discipline: Archaeology; Prehistory
- Sub-discipline: Archaeology of the Mediterranean; Aegean Bronze Age
- Institutions: University College, Oxford; Institute of Archaeology, University College London; McDonald Institute for Archaeological Research; Gonville and Caius College, Cambridge
- Notable works: The Making of the Middle Sea (2013)

Cyprian Broodbank (born 26 December 1964) is a British archaeologist and academic. Since October 2014, he has been Disney Professor of Archaeology at the University of Cambridge and director of the McDonald Institute for Archaeological Research. From 2010 to 2014, he was Professor of Mediterranean Archaeology at University College London.

== Early life and education ==
Broodbank was born on 26 December 1964. He studied modern history at the University of Oxford, graduating in 1986 with a Bachelor of Arts (BA) degree. He then went on to study for a Master of Arts (MA) degree in Aegean and Anatolian prehistory at the University of Bristol, graduating in 1987. He undertook postgraduate study at the Faculty of Classics, University of Cambridge, and completed his Doctor of Philosophy (PhD) degree in 1996. His supervisor was John F. Cherry, and his doctoral thesis was titled "This small world the great: an island archaeology of the early Cyclades".

== Academic career ==
Broodbank began his academic career as a junior research fellow at University College, Oxford, from 1991 to 1993. In 1993, he joined University College London as a lecturer in Aegean archaeology based in the Institute of Archaeology. He was promoted to senior lecturer in 2001 and to reader in 2009. He was a visiting fellow at All Souls College, Oxford, in 2005. In October 2010, he was appointed Professor of Mediterranean Archaeology.

In November 2013, it was announced that he had been elected to the position of Disney Professor of Archaeology at the University of Cambridge. He took up the appointment in October 2014. In addition, he is the director of the McDonald Institute for Archaeological Research, and a professorial fellow of Gonville and Caius College, Cambridge. Since 2022, he has also been British Academy vice-president for British International Research Institutes and a member of the British Academy’s council.

He was awarded the 2003 James R. Wiseman Book Award by the Archaeological Institute of America for his monograph An Island Archaeology of the Early Cyclades (Cambridge University Press, 2001). He was also awarded the 2001 Runciman Award by the Anglo-Hellenic League for the monograph. His monograph The Making of the Middle Sea: A History of the Mediterranean from the Beginning to the Emergence of the Classical World (Thames and Hudson. 2013) has been described as 'an unprecedented work of scholarship; it is unlikely ever to be matched' and as a 'landmark publication'.

Since 2023, he has been co-director of the Oued Beht Archaeological Project (OBAP) in Morocco. In 2025, the OBAP was awarded the "Field Discovery Award" at the 6th Shanghai World Archaeology Forum, and the initial journal article about the OBAPs finds won the 2025 Antiquity prize.

== Personal life ==
In 2006, Broodbank married Lindsay Close Spencer. Together they have two children; one daughter and one son.

== Honours ==
On 11 October 2007, Broodbank was elected a Fellow of the Society of Antiquaries (FSA). In 2014, he was awarded the Wolfson Prize for History for his book The Making of the Middle Sea. On 16 July 2015, he was elected a Fellow of the British Academy (FBA).

== Selected works ==
- Broodbank, Cyprian (2000). An island archaeology of the early Cyclades. Cambridge: Cambridge University Press. ISBN 9780521528443.
- Broodbank, Cyprian (2013). The making of the Middle Sea: a history of the Mediterranean from the beginning to the emergence of the Classical world. London: Thames & Hudson. ISBN 9780500051764.

Academic offices
Preceded by Graeme Barker	Disney Professor of Archaeology, Cambridge University; 2014–present	Incumbent
