= Margarita Gleba =

Archaeologist

Margarita Gleba is an archaeologist and expert on early textiles and other organic materials.

Gleba holds a BS (1997) in biology and art history from Rutgers University, followed by an MA (1999) and PhD (2004) in archaeology from Bryn Mawr College, the latter supervised by Jean MacIntosh Turfa. Her research uses scientific methods in archaeology and focuses on the pre- and protohistory of the peoples and cultures of the Mediterranean region, in addition to the archaeology of organic materials.

From 2005 to 2009, she was research project manager at Copenhagen University, followed by a Marie Curie Intra-European Fellowship at the Institute of Archaeology University College London. After that, she received a European Research Council Starting Grant (2013-2019), conducted at Cambridge University named 'PROduction and CONsumption: Textile Economy and Urbanisation in Mediterranean Europe 1000-500 BCE'. In 2019, Gleba was a featured guest in a BBC Radio broadcast focused on the Scythians. In 2020, she was a lecturer at LMU Munich, before becoming Assistant Professor at the University of Padua in 2021.

== Publications ==
- Gleba, Margarita. Textile production in pre-Roman Italy, (Ancient textiles series; 4) Oxford [England]: Oxbow Books; Oakville, Connecticut: David Brown Book Company, 2008. ISBN 9781782976059.
- Gleba, Margarita and Hilary Wills Becker, eds. Votives, places and rituals in Etruscan religion, studies in honor of Jean MacIntosh Turfa, Leiden; Boston: Brill, 2009. ISBN 9789004170452.
- Gleba, Margarita, and Ulla Mannering, eds. Textiles and Textile Production in Europe: From Prehistory to AD 400. Oxford; Oakville: Oxbow Books, 2012. Accessed March 22, 2021. http://www.jstor.org/stable/j.ctvh1djwg.
- Gleba, Margarita, Beatriz Marín-Aguilera, Bela Dimova, Making cities: economies of production and urbanization in Mediterranean Europe, 1000-500 BC. Cambridge: McDonald Institute for Archaeological Research, 2022. Pp. xvii, 454. ISBN 9781913344061. Repository DOI https://doi.org/10.17863/CAM.76133
