= George Forrest Browne =

Bishop of Bristol

The Right Reverend George Forrest Browne
- Bishop of Bristol
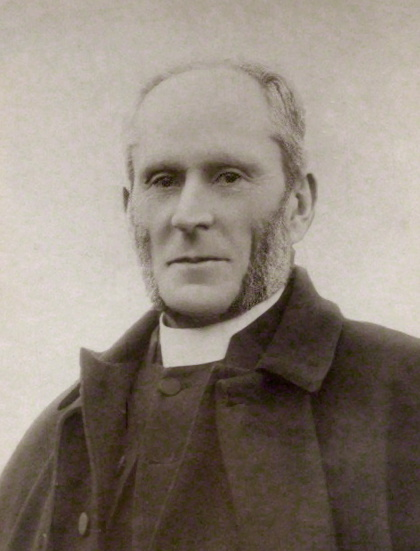
- Gaorge Browne, from a 1907 carte de visite
- Church: Church of England
- See: Bristol
- In office: 1897–1914
- Predecessor: Charles Ellicott
- Successor: George Nickson
- Previous posts: Bishop of Stepney; Bishop

Personal details
- Born: 4 December 1833 York, England
- Died: 1 June 1930 (aged 96) Bexhill-on-Sea, England

George Forrest Browne (4 December 1833 – 1 June 1930) was an English bishop, the first Anglican Bishop of Stepney from 1895 until 1897 when he was appointed Bishop of Bristol.

== Early life ==
Browne was born in York 1833 and educated at St Peter's School, York and St Catharine's College, Cambridge. He became the 30th wrangler in 1856. In 1857 he obtained 2nd class Honours degree in Theology, and was ordained in 1858.

== Career ==
After a spell of school mastering in Scotland, he returned to his college in 1863 as a Fellow. He then held various appointments and spent some time as a parish priest. He became a distinguished archaeologist, and was Disney Professor of Archaeology at Cambridge 1887–92. (Note: The Disney Chair of Archaeology was founded in 1851 by John Disney Esq of Hyde, Ingatestone, Essex, a barrister, collector of antiques and a benefactor of Cambridge University.)

After an Incumbency at Ashley, Cambridgeshire he rose steadily in the Church's hierarchy. From 1891 until 1895 he was Canon Residentiary at St Paul's Cathedral before elevation to the suffragan bishopric of the Diocese of London (from now on named Bishop of Stepney), a post he held until he attained diocesan bishop status with promotion to the See of Bristol.

Taking retirement from his Professorship at the age of 62, Browne went on to become Bishop of Stepney in 1895, and Bishop of Bristol in 1897. He remained at Bristol until 1914. After leaving Bristol, Browne went on to publish no less than six more books in the final years of his retirement. He died at Bexhill-on-Sea in 1930. Browne is commemorated in Bristol Cathedral by a fine bronze bust signed K Scott; it is to be found in the north choir aisle.

== Climbing ==
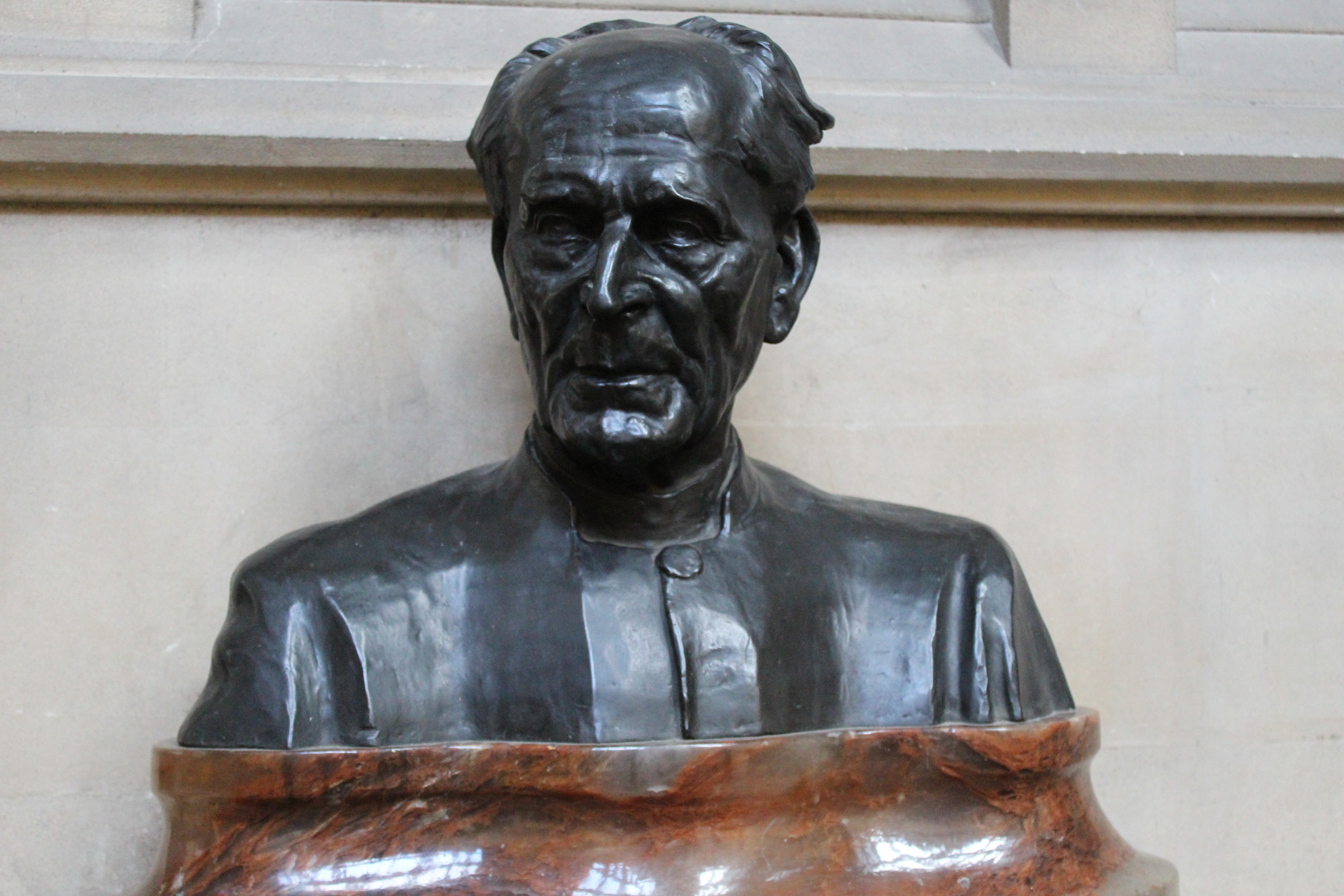
Bust of Browne in Bristol Cathedral by Kathleen Scott

An enthusiast for climbing, Browne was President of the Alpine Club, 1905–1907.

Browne is known amongst speleobibliophiles for his book, Ice-Caves of France and Switzerland, published in 1865. It is one of the most delightful travel books ever written, because of the scientific accuracy and humour of the author.

The Browne family was accustomed to spending their summer holidays abroad, and in the summer of 1861 George was with some of his family at Arzier in the Jura mountains near Geneva. The son of the house spoke of a glacière not far distant. At first Browne supposed this to be a glacier, but on visiting it with the son, he found it was a limestone cave containing permanent ice. Browne was intrigued as to the reason for this phenomenon, and during the next several years spent part of his holidays visiting a number of these ice caves, mainly in the Jura. Altogether he examined 14 or 15 caves personally, heard accounts of several more which he was unable to visit, and studied any accounts he could find in literature.

His book, Ice-Caves of France and Switzerland was the result of his studies. After reviewing previous theories of the origin of subterranean ice, Browne came to the conclusion that the explanation was simple: provided that the chambers of the cave were below the level of the entrance, cold air would sink into the cave in the winter and be unable to escape; water in the cave would freeze, and would remain as ice provided that the interior was not exposed to direct solar radiation. He reported that all the caves which he had examined fulfilled these necessary conditions.

Although Browne did not make detailed surveys, he gave some measurements, or at least estimates, of size, and described the interiors of the caves in careful detail, despite the fact that his lighting was very primitive – sometimes a candle, often just an oil lantern. He would resort to magnesium wire when large chambers had to be illuminated and he regularly provides sketches and plans or sections of some of these.

Browne's descriptions of the caves, with the fantastic ice 'dripstone' formations to be found in some of them, are very vivid. The most entertaining parts of the book, however – and indeed the greater part of it – are devoted to his experiences reaching the caves themselves. Most of them are, or were in those days, far from a town of any size, and the privations endured were considerable. Although the recital of the difficulties of travel and of finding accommodation perhaps becomes a little repetitive, Browne writes with a graphic turn of phrase and gives a spirited idea of the problems of travelling off the beaten track in the 1860s. Food was often a problem, as, for instance, in the small town of Die in the Dauphiné, where the ravenous Browne, after rejecting various other offerings, faced up to the cold mutton, not withstanding the footprints of mice in the cold gravy, only to find that it was so strongly flavoured with garlic that he could not eat it. He was evidently a well-seasoned traveller, and some of the hardships, such as wearing wet clothes for days on end, are mentioned almost as a matter of course.

After his book had gone to press, Browne revisited three ice-caves near Annecy, on this occasion having as a companion Thomas George Bonney, a geologist. Finally, he had determined to visit the caves again in the winter and did so in January 1866 when he managed to revisit two of the caves that he had previously studied. These researches resulted in two more articles.

Browne does not seem to have undertaken any more speleology after 1866, but he was also a keen mountaineer, a founder member of the Alpine Club, and a friend of Charles Hudson, who was killed on the way down from the first ascent of the Matterhorn, and of Edward Whymper, who survived the same expedition. He was President of the Alpine Club in its Jubilee year of 1905.

== Works ==
- The Venerable Bede, 1879
- The Ilam Crosses, 1889
- Lessons from Early English Church History, 1893
- The Christian Church in these Islands before the Coming of Augustine, 1894
- History of St Catharine's College, 1902
- The Continuity of the Holy Catholic Church in England. A Lecture Delivered at St. Columba's Church, Haggerston, in 1896., 1903
- The Conversion of the Heptarchy, 1906
- The Recollections of a Bishop, 1915
- The Importance of Women in Anglo-Saxon Times, the Cultus of St. Peter and St. Paul, and other addresses, 1919

== Notes ==
Academic offices
Preceded by Percy Gardner	Disney Professor of Archaeology, Cambridge University; 1887–1892	Succeeded by William Ridgeway
Church of England titles
Preceded by Inaugural appointment	Bishop of Stepney; 1895–1897	Succeeded by Arthur Winnington-Ingram
Preceded by Charles Ellicott as Bishop of Gloucester and Bristol	Bishop of Bristol; 1897–1914	Succeeded by George Nickson
