= Chris Scarre =

Christopher John Scarre
- Born: November 7, 1954
- Awards: FSA (1986); Felix Neubergh Prize (2006); Hon. Doctorate, Université de Rennes (2018)

Academic background
- Education: University of Cambridge

Academic work
- Discipline: Archaeology
- Institutions: University of Cambridge; Durham University
- Main interests: Prehistory of Atlantic Europe; Megaliths

Christopher John Scarre FSA is an academic and writer in the fields of archaeology, prehistory and ancient history. He is Emeritus Professor at the University of Durham and was head of its archaeology department 2010–2013.

== Education and personal life ==
Scarre graduated with a Bachelor of Arts (BA) degree in 1976. He got a Doctor of Philosophy (PhD) degree in 1982 from the University of Cambridge for his study of archaeological sites and landscape change in Western France.

His brother, Geoffrey Scarre, is Professor Emeritus of Philosophy at the University of Durham. Together they co-edited the book The Ethics of Archaeology: Philosophical Perspectives on Archaeological Practice, published in 2006.

== Academic career ==
Scarre was Deputy Director of the McDonald Institute for Archaeological Research at the University of Cambridge from its foundation in 1990 to 2005. In January 2006, Scarre was appointed Professor of Prehistory at the Department of Archaeology of the University of Durham. He served as Head of the Department of Archaeology at Durham from 2010 to 2013. He retired in 2021 and was made Emeritus Professor of Archaeology at Durham.

He was editor of the Cambridge Archaeological Journal from 1991 to 2005. He was also editor of the international academic journal Antiquity, from January 2013 to December 2017.

He has directed and co-directed excavations at a number of prehistoric sites. These include sites in France, Portugal, and the Channel Islands. He excavated the Tumulus du Péré at Prissé-la-Charrière between 1995 and 2004 together with Luc Laporte and Roger Joussaume. The excavation revealed three early megalithic burial chambers from the fifth millennium BC. From 2008 to 2011 he led excavations exploring the prehistoric monuments of Herm. This AHRC-funded project found artefact spreads probably related to prehistoric manuring and ard-marks.

He conducted excavations at three sites in Portugal in collaboration with Luiz Oosterbeek: the Anta de Lajinha (2006-8), Cabeço dos Pendentes (2007 & 2015), and Anta do Vale da Laje (2017-18). The findings led to several articles and the book Megalithic Tombs in Western Iberia (2020).

Scarre was Principal Investigator of the interdisciplinary "Invisible Dead" project at Durham during 2013 and 2014. The project compared changing mortuary practices and beliefs about death in Britain and the Levant from the Neolithic to the Roman period. The project produced a co-edited volume, Engaging with the Dead (2017).

== Honours ==
Scarre was elected Fellow of the Society of Antiquaries of London (FSA) on 9 January 1986. In 2006 he received the Felix Neubergh Prize from the University of Gothenburg and was Professeur Invité at the Collège de France in Paris. He was a Trustee of the Council for British Archaeology from 2007 to 2013, a panel member on the NERC Radiocarbon Facility Steering Committee (2011-2015), and he sat on the Advisory Board for the National Geographic Society Global Exploration Fund for Northern Europe (2011-2016). He was awarded an honorary doctorate by the Université de Rennes in 2018.

== Selected works ==
- Scarre, Christopher, ed. (1983). Ancient France: Neolithic societies and their landscapes, 6000-2000 BC. Edinburgh: Edinburgh University Press. ISBN 978-0852244418.
- Scarre, Chris (1995). Historical Atlas of Ancient Rome. London: Penguin. ISBN 978-0140513295.
- Scarre, Chris (1995). Chronicle of the Roman Emperors: The Reign-by-Reign Record of the Rulers of Imperial Rome. London: Thames & Hudson. ISBN 0500050775.
- Scarre, Chris (2007). The megalithic monuments of Britain and Ireland. London: Thames & Hudson. ISBN 978-0500286661.
- Scarre, Chris (2011). Landscapes of neolithic Brittany. Oxford: Oxford University Press. ISBN 978-0199281626.
- Scarre, Chris, ed. (2024). The human past: world prehistory & the development of human societies (5th ed.). New York: Thames & Hudson. ISBN 9780500296301.

=== Editorial activity ===
- Renfrew, Colin; Scarre, Chris, eds. (1998). Cognition and Material Culture: The Archaeology of Symbolic Storage. Cambridge: McDonald Institute for Archaeological Research. ISBN 0951942069.
- Scarre, Chris, ed. (1999). The seventy wonders of the ancient world: the great monuments and how they were built. London: Thames & Hudson. ISBN 978-0500050965.
- Scarre, Chris, ed. (2002). Monuments and landscape in Atlantic Europe: perception and society during the Neolithic and early Bronze Age. London: Routledge. ISBN 978-0415273138.
- Scarre, Chris; Lawson, Graeme, eds. (2006). Archaeoacoustics. McDonald Institute Monographs. Cambridge: McDonald Institute for Archaeological Research. ISBN 978-1-902937-35-9.
- Laporte, Luc; Joussaume, Roger; Scarre, Chris, eds. (2006). Origin and Development of the Megalithic Monuments of Western Europe. Bougon: Musée des Tumulus de Bougon. ISBN 2-911743-22-9.
- Scarre, Chris.; Scarre, Geoffrey, eds. (2006). The ethics of archaeology philosophical perspectives on archaeological practice. Cambridge: Cambridge University Press. ISBN 978-0-521-84011-8.
- Bradbury, Jennie; Scarre, Christopher (2017). Engaging with the dead: exploring changing human beliefs about death, mortality and the human body. Oxford: Oxbow. ISBN 9781785707605.
- Scarre, Christopher; Oosterbeek, Luís (2020). Megalithic tombs in Western Iberia: excavations at the Anta da Lajinha. Oxford (GB): Oxbow Books. ISBN 9781785709807.

Academic offices
Preceded by Martin Carver	Editor of Antiquity; 2013–2017	Succeeded by Robert Witcher
