= McDonald Institute for Archaeological Research =

Research institute of the University of Cambridge

- Established: 1990
- Parent institution: Faculty of Human, Social, and Political Science
- Affiliation: University of Cambridge
- Director: Cyprian Broodbank
- Location: Cambridge, England
- Website: www.mcdonald.cam.ac.uk

The McDonald Institute for Archaeological Research is a research institute of the University of Cambridge in England.

== History ==
The institute was established in 1990 through a benefaction from the late Dr Daniel McLean McDonald, a successful industrialist: the endowment totalled approximately £11 million. McDonald (1905–1991) was founder and chairman of the BSR Group, manufacturers of record turntables and record changers. The benefaction enabled the university to construct purpose-built premises for the Institute which include research rooms and laboratories, together with storage space, a seminar room and a modest library.

== Mission and purpose ==
The Institute provides support for Cambridge-based researchers in the various branches of archaeology, with a particular interest in the archaeology of early human cognition. The Institute emphasises the value of archaeological science, and contains laboratories for geoarchaeology, archaeozoology, archaeobotany, and artefact analysis. The extensive faunal remains collection of the Department of Archaeology is now based within the McDonald Institute and a corresponding reference collection of plant remains is being assembled. There are also research rooms for post-excavation work on major field projects.

The institute is primarily a centre for post-doctoral research though it does provide facilities for a number of PhD students whose research fits within existing McDonald Institute themes. In addition to providing space for projects and researchers, the McDonald Institute also has an annual programme of grants for Cambridge-based projects, and an active publications division which produces the McDonald Institute Monograph series and the twice-yearly Cambridge Archaeological Journal.

== Notable people ==
- Roger Bland, Senior Fellow since 2015
- Cyprian Broodbank, Director since October 2014
- Norman Hammond, Senior Fellow
- Mei Jianjun, Fellow
- David Oates, Fellow from 1997 to 2004
- Joan Oates, Senior Research Fellow since 1995
- Colin Renfrew, Director from 1990 to 2004, Senior Fellow since 2004
- Jane Renfrew, Senior Fellow
- Chris Scarre, deputy director from 1990 to 2005
- Anthony Snodgrass, Senior Fellow
- Simon Stoddart, Acting Deputy Director from 2014 to 2017
- Joanne Elizabeth Cutler, Archaeologist specialising in Aegean and Mediterranean prehistory
- Marie Louise Stig Sørensen, Emeritus Professor
