= European Association of Archaeologists =

- Location within Czech Republic Location within Europe
- Abbreviation: EAA
- Formation: 1994
- Type: Nonprofit
- Headquarters: Prague, Czech Republic
- Coordinates: 50°05′15″N 14°25′17″E
- Region served: Europe
- Fields: Archaeology, Cultural heritage management
- Members: 3.973 (2023)
- Official language: En
- President: Eszter Bánffy
- Website: https://www.e-a-a.org

The European Association of Archaeologists (EAA) is a membership-based, not-for-profit association, open to archaeologists and other related or interested individuals or bodies in Europe and beyond. It was founded in 1994 at an inaugural meeting in Ljubljana, Slovenia, where its Statutes were formally approved, and recognized by the Council of Europe in 1999. EAA has had over 15,000 members on its database from 75 countries. EAA holds an annual conference (Annual Meetings) and publishes the flagship journal, the European Journal of Archaeology. The EAA also publishes an in-house newsletter, The European Archaeologist (TEA), and two monograph series (Themes in Contemporary Archaeology and Elements: The Archaeology of Europe). The registered office of the association is in Prague, Czech Republic.

== Mission ==
The EAA offers Statutes, Code of practice and Principles, and code of practice for fieldwork training. The EAA further promotes international cooperation though interactions with Affiliate Organizations. In 1999, the EAA was granted consultative status with the Council of Europe, which in 2003 was upgraded to participatory status.

== Governance ==
The EAA is governed by an Executive Board elected by full Members of the Association. The Executive Board comprises three or four officers (president, incoming president, treasurer, and secretary) and six ordinary members. The current president is Eszter Bánffy and former presidents include:

- Kristian Kristiansen (1994–1998)
- Willem Willems (1998–2003)
- Anthony Harding (2003–2009)
- Friedrich Lüth (2009–2014)
- Marc Lodewijckx – acting president (2014–2015)
- Felipe Criado-Boado (2015–2021)
- Eszter Bánffy (2021–2027)

== Awards ==
The EAA awards prizes and honours relevant to its aims. These include the European Archaeological Heritage Prize, the EAA Student Award, the EAA Book Prize and Honorary membership in the EAA.

=== European Archaeological Heritage Prize ===
The EAA instituted the European Archaeological Heritage Prize in 1999. An independent committee awards the prize annually to an outstanding individual, institution, (local or regional) government or a (European or international) officer or body

- 1999: M.M. Carrilho, Minister of Culture from Portugal
- 2000: Margareta Biörnstad, former state antiquarian, Sweden
- 2001: Otto Braasch, member of the Aerial Archaeological Group (AARG), Germany
- 2002: Henry Cleere, ICOMOS Paris
- 2003: Viktor Trifonov, Institute of Material Culture, Russian Academy of Sciences in Sankt Petersburg
- 2004: Illicit Antiquities Research Centre at the McDonald Institute for Archaeological Research at the University of Cambridge
- 2005: Kristian Kristiansen, Sweden
- 2006: John Coles, UK
- 2007: Siegmar von Schnurbein, Germany
- 2008: Jean-Paul Demoule, France
- 2009: Ulrich Ruoff, Switzerland
- 2010: David John Breeze, Scotland
- 2011: Girolamo Ferdinando, UK and Avvocato Francesco Pinto, Italy
- 2012: Willem J.H. Willems, Dean of the Faculty of Archaeology, University of Leiden, Netherlands
- 2013: M. Daniel Thérond, former Head of Department of the Culture, Heritage and Diversity Department, Council of Europe, and Vincent Gaffney
- 2014: Marie Louise Stig Sørensen and Erzsébet Jerem
- 2015: María Ángeles Querol Fernández and Martin Oswald Hugh Carver
- 2016: Unité d'Archéologie de la Ville de Saint-Denis and Caroline Sturdy Colls
- 2017: Unità di Crisi e di Coordinamento Regionale Marche del Ministero dei beni e delle attività culturali e del turismo
- 2018: Ivan Pavlů and Francisco Javier Sánchez-Palencia Ramos
- 2019: Osman Kavala and Fundación Catedral Santa María, Vitoria-Gasteiz, Basque country, Spain
- 2020: Gilly Carr and REMAINS of Greenland program and network; honorary mention to SARAT (Safeguarding Archaeological Assets of Turkey) Project and SPLASHCOS (Submerged Prehistoric Archaeology and Landscapes of the Continental Shelf)
- 2021: Laurajane Smith, Citizens Committee of Ierapetra and SITAR – Sistema Informativo Territoriale Archeologico di Roma / Geographic Archaeological Information System of Rome; honorary mention to West Dunbartonshire Council
- 2022: Sophia Labadi and AVASA/IIMAS - Engaging youngsters in cultural heritage: Urkesh One-on One program
- 2023: Fedir Androshchuk and Sociedad de Ciencias Aranzadi, honorary mention to Arturo Ruiz Rodríguez and the International Organising Team of the First Kings of Europe exhibition
- 2024: Claus von Carnap-Bornheim and Geoportale Nazionale per l'Archeologia/The National Geoportal for Archaeology
- 2025: Maksym Yevhenovych Levada and Scientific and Research Lab "Archaïc"

=== Student Award ===
A student award was instituted in 2002 and is awarded annually for the best paper presented at the EAA Annual Meeting by a student or an archaeologist working on a dissertation.

- 2002 - Laura M. Popova
- 2003 - Anita Synnestvedt
- 2004 - Jonathan D. Le Huray
- 2005 - Marta Caroscio
- 2006 - NOT AWARDED
- 2007 - Goce Naumov
- 2008 - NOT AWARDED
- 2009 - Pamela Cross
- 2010 - Camilla Norman
- 2011 - Heide Wrobel Norgaard
- 2012 - Maria Leena Lahtinen
- 2013 - Oliver Dietrich
- 2014 - Can Aksoy and Ziyacan Bayar
- 2015 - Patrycja Kupiec, and special commendation to Christine Cave and Alex Davies
- 2016 - Sian Mui and Shumon Hussain
- 2017 - Emma Brownlee and Yftinus van Popta
- 2018 - Hanna Kivikero
- 2019 - Annabell Zander
- 2020 - Samantha Leggett, and honorary mention to Tomas Janek
- 2021 - Karen O'Toole
- 2022 - Paloma Cuello del Pozo
- 2023 - Mathilde Vestergaard Meyer
- 2024 - Giacomo Casucci
- 2025 - Daniel Alonso Naranjo

=== EAA Book Prize ===
The EAA annually awards the EAA Book Prize.

EAA Book Prize winning publications:

- 2023
  - The Routledge Handbook of Archaeothanatology: Bioarchaeology of Mortuary Behaviour, Edited by Christopher Knüsel and Eline Schotsmans, Routledge 2022
  - April Nowell: Growing up in the Ice Age: Fossil and Archaeological Evidence of the Lived Lives of Plio-Pleistocene Children, Oxbow Books 2021
- 2024
  - Death in Irish Prehistory, by Gabriel Cooney, Royal Irish Academy 2023
  - Hunter-Gatherer Ireland: Making Connections in an Island World, by Graeme Warren, Oxbow Books 2022
- 2025
  - Heritage and Healing in Syria and Iraq, by Zena Kamash, Manchester University Press 2024
  - Must Farm Pile-dwelling Settlement. Volume 1. Landscape, Architecture and Occupation, Edited by Mark Knight, Rachel Ballantyne, Matthew Brudenell, Anwen Cooper, David Gibson and Iona Robinson Zeki, McDonald Institute for Archaeological Research 2024
  - Must Farm Pile-dwelling Settlement. Volume 2. Specialist Reports, Edited by Rachel Ballantyne, Anwen Cooper, David Gibson, Mark Knight and Iona Robinson Zeki, McDonald Institute for Archaeological Research 2024
  - Knowth, by Helena King, Royal Irish Academy 2024

== Annual meetings ==
The EAA inaugural meeting took place in Ljubljana, Slovenia in September 1994. The official first Annual Meeting took place in September 1995 in Santiago de Compostela, Spain, and an Annual Meeting has taken place every year since. The table below shows the Meeting locations and dates.

	Ljubljana, Slovenia	September 22–25, 1994
1st	Santiago de Compostela, Spain	September 20–25, 1995
2nd	Riga, Latvia	September 25–29, 1996
3rd	Ravenna, Italy	September 24–28, 1997
4th	Gothenburg, Sweden	September 23–27, 1998
5th	Bournemouth, United Kingdom	September 14–19, 1999
6th	Lisbon, Portugal	September 12–17, 2000
7th	Esslingen am Neckar, Germany	September 19–23, 2001
8th	Thessaloniki, Greece	September 24–28, 2002
9th	Saint Petersburg, Russia	September 10–14, 2003
10th	Lyon, France	September 5–12, 2004
11th	Cork, Ireland	September 5–11, 2005
12th	Kraków, Poland	September 19–24, 2005
13th	Zadar, Croatia	September 18–23, 2007
14th	La Valletta, Malta	September 16–21, 2008
15th	Riva del Garda, Italy	September 15–20, 2009
16th	The Hague, Netherlands	September 1–5, 2010
17th	Oslo, Norway	September 14–18, 2011
18th	Helsinki, Finland	August 30 – September 1, 2012
19th	Plzeň, Czech Republic	September 4–8, 2013
20th	Istanbul, Turkey	September 10–14, 2014
21st	Glasgow, United Kingdom	September 2–5, 2015
22nd	Vilnius, Lithuania	August 31 – September 4, 2016
23rd	Maastricht, Netherlands	August 30 – September 3, 2017
24th	Barcelona, Spain	September 5–8, 2018
25th	Bern, Switzerland	September 4–8, 2019
26th	Virtual, online	August 26–30, 2020
27th	Kiel, Germany	September 8–11, 2021
28th	Budapest, Hungary	August 31 – September 3, 2022
29th	Belfast, United Kingdom	August 30 – September 2, 2023
30th	Rome, Italy	August 26–31, 2024
31st	Belgrade, Serbia	August–September, 2025
32nd	Athens, Greece	August–September, 2026
33rd*	Leiden, Netherlands	August 25 – August 28 2027

* Those marked with an asterisk are upcoming

== Publications ==
The EAA publishes the quarterly European Journal of Archaeology (EJA), originally the Journal of European Archaeology (1993–1997), the monograph series THEMES In Contemporary Archaeology, Elements: The Archaeology of Europe series and an electronic newsletter, The European Archaeologist (TEA). EJA is currently co-edited by Catherine J. Frieman and Zena Kamash.Editorial board

== Oscar Montelius Foundation ==
In 2013, the European Association of Archaeologists (EAA) established the Oscar Montelius Foundation (OMF) to support archaeological research, professional development, and heritage practice in Europe. The foundation is named after the Swedish archaeologist Oscar Montelius, known for his contributions to prehistoric archaeology.

The aims of the Oscar Montelius Foundation include promoting the exchange of archaeological information, encouraging ethical and scientific standards in archaeological practice, supporting the interests of professional archaeologists, and fostering cooperation with other archaeological and heritage organisations with similar objectives. The foundation also supports initiatives connected with the activities of the EAA, including professional development and scholarly exchange among its members.

The Oscar Montelius Foundation is governed by a Board of Trustees appointed by the EAA Executive Board. Trustees are typically former members of the Executive Board and serve fixed terms, with limitations on reappointment. An auditor appointed by the Executive Board oversees the foundation’s financial accounts.

=== Early Career Achievement Prize ===
The Early Career Achievement Prize (ECAP) is an annual award established by the Oscar Montelius Foundation in 2021 to recognise outstanding contributions by early career professionals in archaeology and related heritage fields. The prize is presented during the opening ceremony of the EAA Annual Meeting.

Eligible nominees are early career researchers or practitioners, defined as individuals who have completed a PhD or MA/MS within five years of the nomination submission or who are within five years of their first professional appointment. Self-nominations are not permitted; nominations must be submitted by qualified proposers, including EAA members, academic supervisors, and directors of archaeological or heritage institutions.

Candidates are assessed according to four criteria: societal impact, innovative impact, interdisciplinary impact, and international impact, recognising contributions that demonstrate influence beyond disciplinary or national boundaries.

Recipients of the prize receive a diploma and three years of EAA membership funded by the Oscar Montelius Foundation. The foundation may also contribute to travel and accommodation costs for recipients to attend the Annual Meeting. Honorary mentions may be awarded in some years.

==== Recipients ====
- 2021 – Anita Radini
- 2022 – Constanze Hedwig Schattke
- 2023 – Abel Ruiz-Giralt
- 2024 – Louise Cardoso de Mello
- 2025 – Jorge Rouco Collazo
