= House of Lysias =

Residential building in Dura Europos

House of Lysias (1936)

Excavation photo: altars)

The House of Lysias is the largest residential building in Dura Europos. It was the residence of the local governors, the so-called Strategoi, for several generations. Dura Europos is a well-preserved ancient city in present-day Syria. The place was a Hellenistic foundation, then conquered by the Parthians, and eventually came under Roman rule. In the year 266 AD, Dura Europos was conquered by the Sassanids. Since the city was never resettled after that, it is still relatively well preserved today.

The house occupies an entire insula (modern number D1). The name Lysias was found several times in the house. From other sources, a governor with the full name Septimius Aurelius Lysisa is known, who was likely the resident of the house. His family held high offices in the city from the time of the Arsacids (Parthians) to the time of the Romans. The house was located on the main street of the city and directly opposite the Temple of Zeus Megistos. In and around the temple, there are inscriptions that clearly demonstrate the close connection of the Lysias family with the temple.

The house was uncovered between 1935 and 1936 through excavations by the American Yale University. A French excavation expedition, which worked in the city before 2011, uncovered the building again.

The entire building is arranged around a courtyard in the northern section and features various special rooms that are not found in other houses in the city. Apparently, the insula was originally inhabited by several residential houses, but the owners of the house seem to have gradually acquired the neighboring houses and integrated them into the larger whole. In the courtyard, there were columns that possibly belonged to a loggia on the south side of the courtyard. This could have provided access to rooms on the upper floor. The building had several staircases, but it is uncertain whether there was more than one additional floor. The courtyards of the house were paved with fired bricks, while the majority of the structure was made of unfired bricks. In the courtyards, there were altars. During the excavations, the researchers came across remnants of figurative wall paintings, and some rooms featured decorated stucco cornices as the upper wall finish. Fragments of sculptures were also found in the house, which in turn underscore the wealth of the former inhabitants.

Different rooms had economic functions. In many cases, these are no longer recognizable, but there is clear evidence of food storage and meal preparation. A room seems to have served as a bath, although running water is not attested.

The walls of the building were adorned with numerous graffiti, including some with the name Lysias and dates. Since the years are too far apart to be attributed to a single person, there must have been several men with this name. The Lysias family is known through numerous inscriptions in the city, in which members bear the title strategos – governor. Notably, this title is never mentioned in the inscriptions of the house.

== Literature ==
- Jennifer A. Baird: The inner lives of ancient houses: an archaeology of Dura-Europos (1st ed.). Oxford 2014, ISBN 978-0-19-968765-7. OCLC 873746891
- Jennifer A. Baird: Dura-Europos. Bloomsbury Academic, London 2018, ISBN 978-1-4725-2211-5
