= Marie Louise Stig Sørensen =

Danish archaeologist

Prof Marie Louise Stig Sørensen FBA FSA
- Awards: European Archaeology Heritage Prize 2014

Academic background
- Thesis: The transition from Bronze Age to Iron Age in Scandinavia : a study of the changes reflected by the bronzes from period 5 and 6 in Scandinavia (1984)

Academic work
- Institutions: University of Cambridge; Leiden University
- Doctoral students: Joanna Bruck; John Carman; Rebecca Haboucha; Thomas Torp Hansen; Raphaël Henkes; Kim Eileen Ruf; Joanna Sofaer; Donna Yates (professor)

Marie Louise Stig Sørensen FBA FSA (born 1954) is a Danish archaeologist and academic. She is Emeritus Professor of European Prehistory and Heritage Studies at the University of Cambridge and Professor of Bronze Age Archaeology at the University of Leiden. Her research focuses on Bronze Age Europe, heritage, and archaeological theory.

== Early life ==
Sørensen was born in Denmark in 1954. She graduated from the University of Aarhus in 1981, and later received a PhD from the University of Cambridge in 1985 on the subject of the Bronze Age to Iron Age transition in Scandinavia.

== Career ==
Sørensen was appointed at the Department of Archaeology and Anthropology, University of Cambridge in 1987. In 2011 she was appointed a Reader at the University of Cambridge, and in 2012 she became a Professor in Bronze Age studies at the University of Leiden. She is a Fellow of Jesus College, Cambridge where she is Director of Studies in Archaeology and in Human, Social, and Political Sciences.

She has received research funding from a range of research councils, including the Cultural Heritage and the Re-construction of Identities after Conflict project, and the Leverhulme Trust-funded Changing Beliefs of the Human Body project. Sørensen is undertaking excavations at the Bronze Age tell at Százhalombatta, Hungary, and at an early Luso-African settlement on Santiago Island, Cape Verde.

Her monograph Gender Archaeology is a key publication.

== Honours and awards ==
Sørensen was elected as a Fellow of the Society of Antiquaries of London (FSA) on 10 October 2010. In 2022, she was elected a Fellow of the British Academy (FBA), the United Kingdom's national academy for the humanities and social sciences.

Sørensen was awarded the 16th European Archaeology Heritage Prize in 2014, in recognition of her exceptional contributions to heritage preservation. She gave the Felix Neubergh lecture at the University of Gothenburg, Sweden, and received the Rigmor and Carl Holst-Knudsens Science Prize from Aarhus University in 2014. In 2019 she was elected as a member of the Royal Norwegian Society of Sciences and Letters.

== Selected publications ==
- Sørensen M.L.S. 1997. Reading Dress: the construction of social categories and identities in Bronze Age Europe. Journal of European Archaeology 5(1), 93–114.
- Diaz-Andreu M. and Sørensen M.L.S. 1998. Excavating Women: A History of Women in European Archaeology. London: Routledge.
- Sørensen M.L.S. 2000. Gender Archaeology. Cambridge: Polity Press.
- Sørensen M.L.S. 2009. Gender, Material Culture and Identity in the Viking Age Diaspora. Viking and Medieval Scandinavia 5, 245–261.
- Sorensen M.L.S. and Rebay-Salisbury K. 2009. Landscapes of the body: burials of the Middle Bronze Age in Hungary. European Journal of Archaeology 11(1), 49–74. DOI: 10.1177/1461957108101241
- Rebay-Salisbury, K., Sorensen, M.L.S and Hughes, J. (eds.), 2010. Body Parts and Bodies Whole: Changing Relations and Meanings. Oxford: Oxbow Books.
- Sørensen M.L.S. 2010. Households. In T. Earle (ed.), Organizing Bronze Age Societies. The Mediterranean, Central Europe & Scandinavia Compared. Cambridge: Cambridge University Press. 122–154.
