= Archaeology of childhood =

Field of study

The archaeology of childhood is an emerging field of study within archaeology that applied anthropology, ethnography, history, sociology, osteology and biological anthropology to the study of the development and lives of juvenile human individuals (children) in past societies from a material perspective.

== Theoretical background ==
=== Early theories ===
French sociologist Robert Hertz, in his book Death and the Right Hand (1960), voiced contemporary views on child burials being less elaborate in the past because children were not integrated into society yet and it was thus easier to part with them. Philippe Ariès wrote a highly influential historical study of childhood in Centuries of Childhood (1962), arguing that "childhood", associated with innocence (i.e., "cherubs"), was a modern convention and that pre-17th century (European) children were treated as small adults.

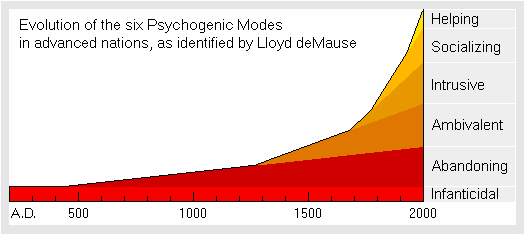
Chart showing the evolution of six child-rearing psychogenic modes in "advanced nations" based on the black and white chart from "The Emotional Life of Nations" by Lloyd DeMause (2002), also appearing in earlier works.

The life course approach was developed within history, biology, economics, psychology and the social sciences in the 1960s in order to analyze the structural, social, cultural and health relationships between generations. Events that happen during early life were highlighted in formal theory as having significant impact on later life status.

In the 1970s and 1980s, social historical debates on adult-child relations through time, especially in early modern Europe, were three-stranded according to Mark Golden:

1. Childhood changed over time, and our modern (Western) concept of children is a modern social invention, different to attitudes among "infanticidal/abandoning" societies in the past.
2. Attitudes towards children were steady in 16th-19th century England and United States.
3. Attitudes towards children are historically contingent and show spatial and temporal variation. Historian Stephen Wilson gives examples of medieval and pre-industrial families in Europe showing great grief at infant death, care for ill children, and the importance of children in religious practice despite (or even due to) high child mortality.

Those who tried to study children archaeologically did so in isolation, until the 1990s. Early researchers included British archaeologists Gawain and Norman Hammond. They called on archaeologists to consider the effects of child play on the distribution of artefacts on sites, by looking at the effects of children playing on trash distribution in a modern vacant grassland in Berkeley, California. Yet, the focus was not on how to recognize children playing but to recognize that this might be a "distorting effect" on artefact distribution.

=== Second-wave feminist archaeology ===
The 1980s saw the rise of feminist archaeology. The same impulse that drove some archaeologists to find and study women in archaeological research to counter androcentrism, triggered much of the research into the archaeology of childhood. Gender where it intersected with class, sexuality, race as well as age began to be interrogated. Studied highlighted the role women played in ancient societies and how sex roles began to be socialized or performed from a young age. In other words, they studied "the production of adulthood". Henrietta Moore demonstrated in her anthropological work Space, Text and Gender (1986) how gendered space among the Marakwet of western Kenya was interpreted differently where it intersected age hierarchies. The close research link between gender and age has persisted.

In the 1980s-1990s, the "child" in archaeology began to be studied in its own right. Grete Lillehammer, in 'A child is born: the child's world in an archaeological perspective' (1989), put forward a methodological manifesto to recognize and study children from archaeological remains, especially human bones, stone artefacts and toys. In Gender and Archaeology: Contesting the Past (1999), Roberta Gilchrist reflected on the identification of different ages, while differentiating between biological, chronological and social life stages. In 2023, April Nowell received the 2023 European Archaeological Association Book Prize for Growing up in the Ice Age: fossil and archaeological evidence of the lived lives of Plio-Pleistocene children (2021), which was described as "a socially inclusive emphasis on dynamic and diverse childhoods, in which children are seen to have been active social and economic agents" with a wider evolutionary perspective.

=== Biological anthropology & evolutionary studies ===
Important works studying biological stages of human young were published from the 1990s onwards. In Evolutionary Hypotheses for Human Childhood (1997), Barry Bogin argued that "childhood" was a unique social as well as physiological stage in human life when compared to other great apes and explored models and mechanisms for why childhood evolved. Humans have long infancy periods when a baby will be mostly if not completely dependent on its mother and community (cooperative breeding, alloparenting) for survival. During the subsequent childhood stage where overall growth slows, the young individual is very active and processing a lot of information.

=== Current trends ===
For the past two decades, research has followed the trajectory set in the 1990s for more context-specific studies of children themselves, including their personhood. There have been comprehensive studies of the variability of childhood in past and present societies. There has also been productive discourse on the main issues of biological and social approaches to childhood in archaeology. Joanna Sofaer's seminal work The Body as Material Culture (2006) reserved a chapter on Age, and in the same year Mary Lewis published The Bioarchaeology of Children. A focus on child bodies corresponds to a focus on their individual stories.

== Archaeological applications ==
=== Child bodies and bioarchaeology ===
Archaeologists have and are developing methods to estimate ages of people more accurately from their skeletons. Some newer ageing methods include AlQahtani et al. (2010) and Shapland & Lewis (2014). Common methods of ageing are, in order of decreasing accuracy: tooth formation, dental eruption, fusion of the long bones, fusion of the skull epiphyses, and bone size.

The health of child bodies related to early-onset diseases or malnutrition have been studied. Anemia is one such disease which supposedly manifested as skull porosities in a high proportion of child remains in the Mediterranean and Americas. The paleopathology of children has been studied by Mary Lewis, particularly evidence of work strain such as joint disease and trauma in young urban medieval males from England (900–1550 BCE) which indicated that they may have been doing domestic service and participating in interpersonal violence.

=== Life stages ===
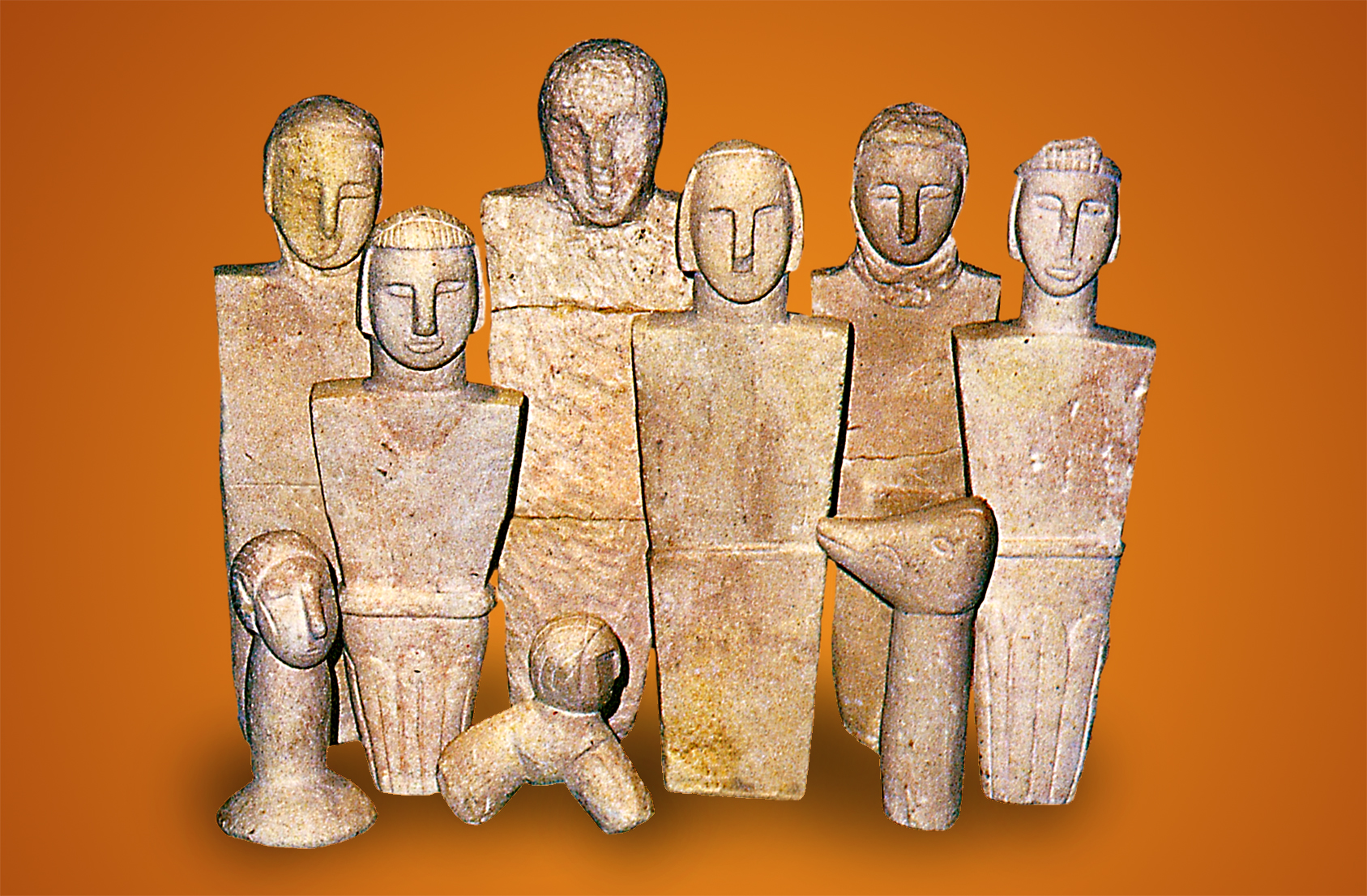
Stone figurines found at the Xagħra Stone Circle, now displayed at the Ġgantija museum

It is not common for specific life stages in the past to be physically preserved. Distinguishing child depictions on figurative objects can be problematic, as smaller individuals in group compositions for example may not necessarily be children. But the Xagħra Stone Circle is one rare example of various life stages discovered together. These depictions are inanimate so we cannot associate each stage with its responsibilities and expectations. Full archaeological study can shed some light on life courses. Roberta Gilchrist took such an approach in her book Medieval Life: Archaeology and the Life Course (2012).

=== Funerary treatment ===
Generally, due to delayed personhood for young children, infants tend to be buried separate from adult burials or else differently to adults, and in some periods tended to be buried within buildings as opposed to cemeteries. This is context-specific and variable through time. Sometimes children would be buried with items that would compensate for their early death or act as amults for their protections such as quartz pebbles in Bronze Age child burials in Ireland. In some cases, children have relatively less decorated burials; but there are exceptions. Those with elaborate and furnished burials have been interpreted as inheriting prestige and rank, but this assumption should not be taken for granted. Children may be buried with tools that suggest what activities they were involved with in life, such as weaving or grinding grain.

=== Infanticide and child sacrifice ===
Infanticidal practices in the past have been the subject of much archaeological debate. Specifically, how common a practice this was and what this means for our interpretation of overall attitudes towards children in past societies. The theory that high child mortality leads to parental indifference to children has been criticized. It is also clear that in societies where infanticide was practised, wanted children could be cared for greatly. For example, wanted children in Classical Greece were cared for and their deaths mourned, though infant exposure (especially of female infants) was practised.

Children were sometimes sacrificed because they had qualities different to adults that gave them ritual importance. For example, children from all over the Inca Empire were selected for the capacocha (sacrificial rite marking important events). Sacrificed children, according to isotopic analyses of their hair and contents of their organs (well preserved due to the cold mountain climate) were fed typically elite diets, given coca and alcohol for many months until their sacrifice at important shrines. The reasons for sacrifice, based on ethnography, seems to have been the purity of children and their mediator role between their people and the Inca deities. They may have thus been married to persons in the landscape (e.g., the mountain). The sacrifices also had political weight. The Llullaillaco children were sacrificed after the Llullaillaco region had been conquered by the Incas. Another famous example of capacocha is Mummy Juanita found on Mount Ampato, Peru.

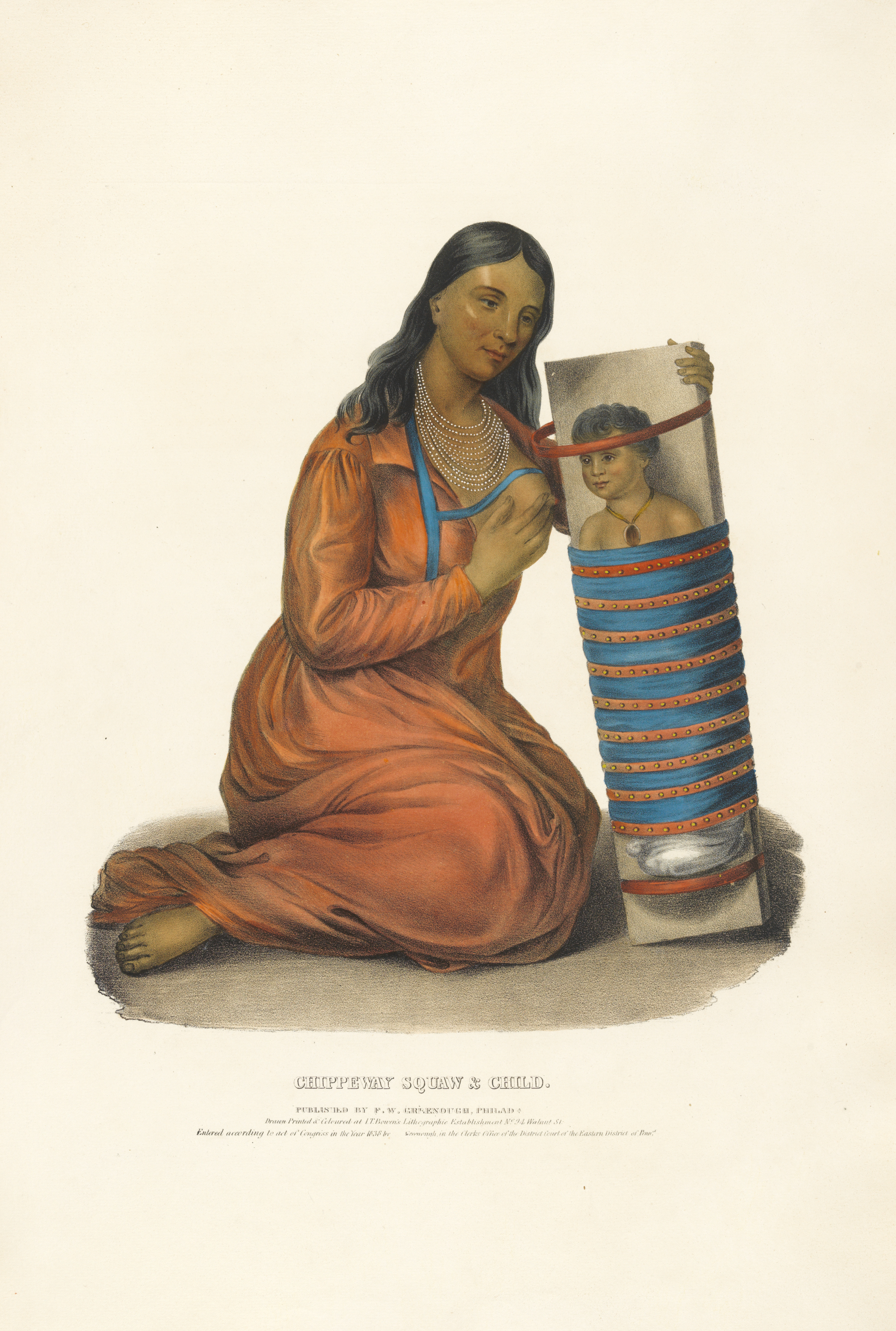
An example of a cradleboard in use

=== Childcare ===
As children are dependent on their parents and alloparents, childcare is an important aspect of their lives. Examples of childcare have been cradleboarding and intentional cranial modification. The latter is practiced by societies around the world for aesthetic or medical purposes. An infant's head is very pliable and can be shaped by tightly wrapping it in certain ways.

The rare fossilized White Sands footprints show adults, teenagers and children moving across a landscape tens of thousands of years ago. Footprints of a female adult and occasional ones of a toddler together track how the single adult was moving in the landscape with the child without a sling, alternately carrying them, shifting them from side to side, and letting them walk alongside her.

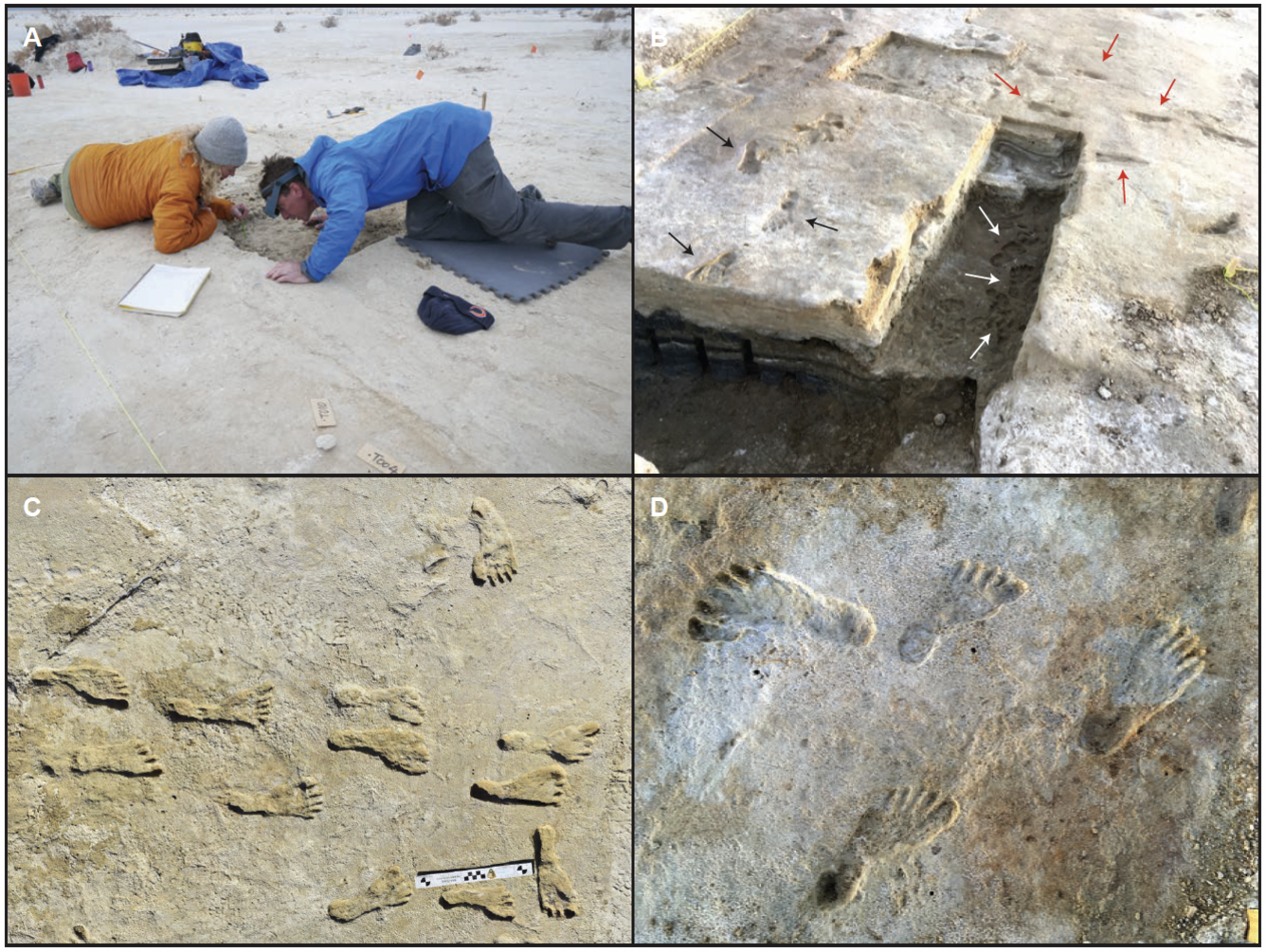
Details of excavations at the White Sands National Park, and the footprints uncovered

There are some child-related assemblages that can be studied archaeologically. Objects like ceramic feeding bottles and rattles are usually associated with children but their recovery depends on preservation.

=== Learning ===
Children, whether formally taught or not, tend to imitate or practice the skills of those older than them. These include pottery-making, hunting or basket-weaving. It is possible to distinguish pottery vessels and figurines made by children from those made by adults, both using technical analysis (more crudely made, smaller vessels are attributed to amateurs, who may include children) and measurements of ridge densities preserved on the surface of ceramics. For example, fingerprints of a 13-year-old child and two adults were found on fragments of pottery from Orkney, indicating that older potters may have been teaching novices how to make vessels. In Ancient Mesopotamia, high status children learned to write using student practice tablets, and subsequently participated in social and political life differently.

=== Play and social lives ===
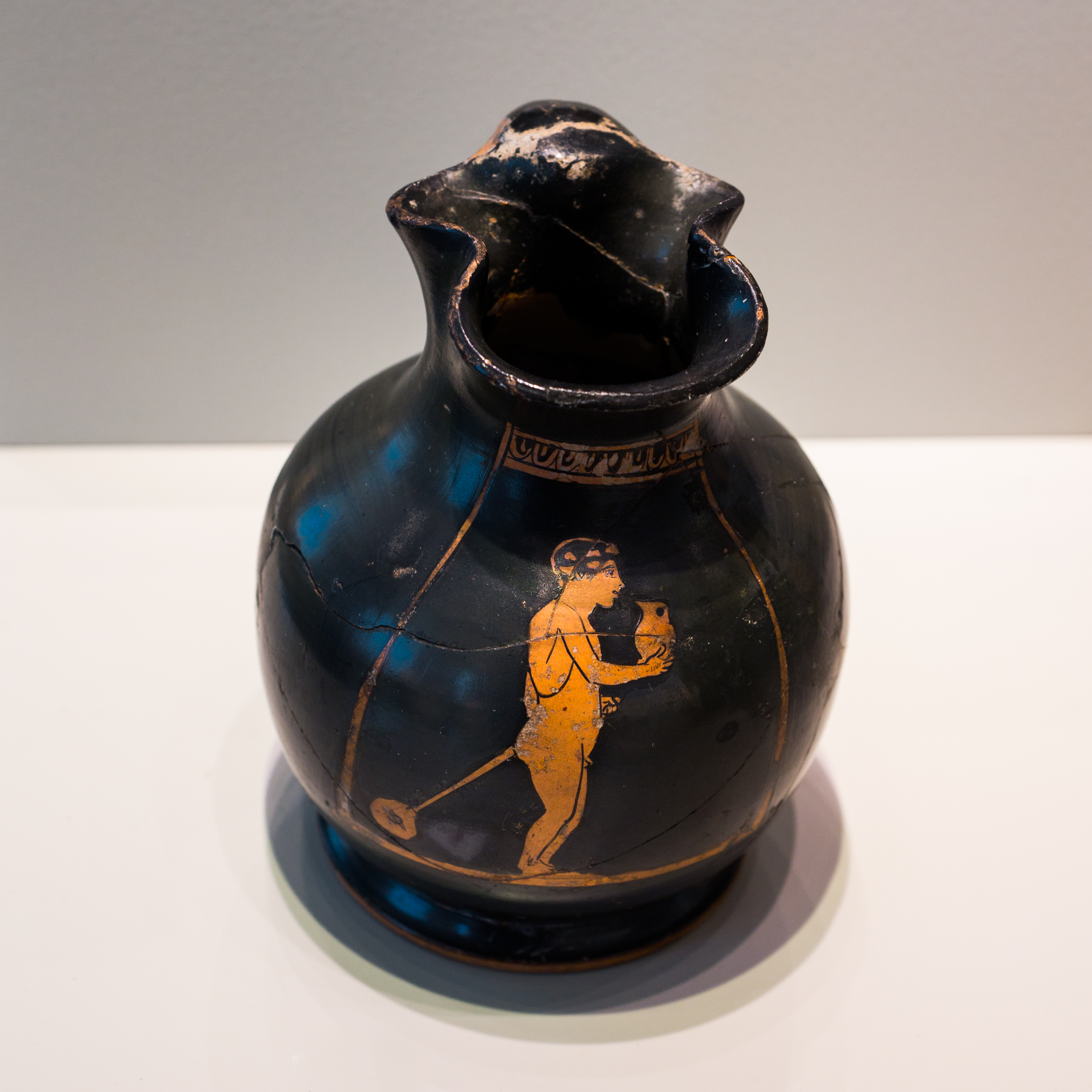
Miniature chous depicting a young boy pulling a wheeled toy and smelling a chous

In many ancient societies as in many modern societies, children spend most of their time post-infancy with individuals other than their parents, including their siblings, peers and other relatives. Play and socialization beyond the parent-child relationship are therefore important. Ancient Greek choes (small wine jugs) produced for sale at the Anthesteria festival (in which children participated) in Classical Athens depict scenes from childhood that are informative of play. It is suspected that these were produced as gifts to children. Some scenes include children playing with wheeled toys and older children looking after younger children on swings. Though many children play with what they find, and such makeshift playthings rarely preserve in archaeological contexts, there are extant examples of what could be toys from the past. Although, some toys are found within burials, and burials tend to be separate cultural performance and ritual grounds than daily life, thus obscuring their meaning.

== Modern debates and future directions ==
There is increasing attention paid to the relationships between the youngest and oldest of society. Like childhood in the past, the experience of the elderly, beyond possibly being important members of society, was understudied until recently. For example, grandparents can play a great role as alloparents, and this close relationship can be studied archaeologically.

The archaeology of childhood has been studied in the margins by a few interested researchers – predominantly those identifying as women; however it is yet to be incorporated into mainstream discourse and standard archaeological interpretation. This may be due to the relatively poor preservation of subadult remains and therefore their under-representation in archaeological assemblages, or to the marginalization of subadults by adult academics (i.e. adultcentrism).

== See also ==
- Outline of childhood
- Childhood in medieval England
