= Querol (surname) =

Querol is a surname. Notable people with the surname include:

- Agustí Querol Subirats (1860–1909), Spanish sculptor
- David Querol (born 1989), Spanish footballer
- Ferran Velazco Querol (born 1976), Spanish rugby union player
- Juan Querol (born 1958), Cuban handball player
- Leopoldo Querol (1899–1985), Spanish classical pianist
- María Ángeles Querol (born 1948), Spanish historian, professor, and writer
- Néstor Querol (born 1987), Spanish footballer
- Sergio Querol (born 1965), Cuban sprinter
