= Heather Grabbe =

Political scientist

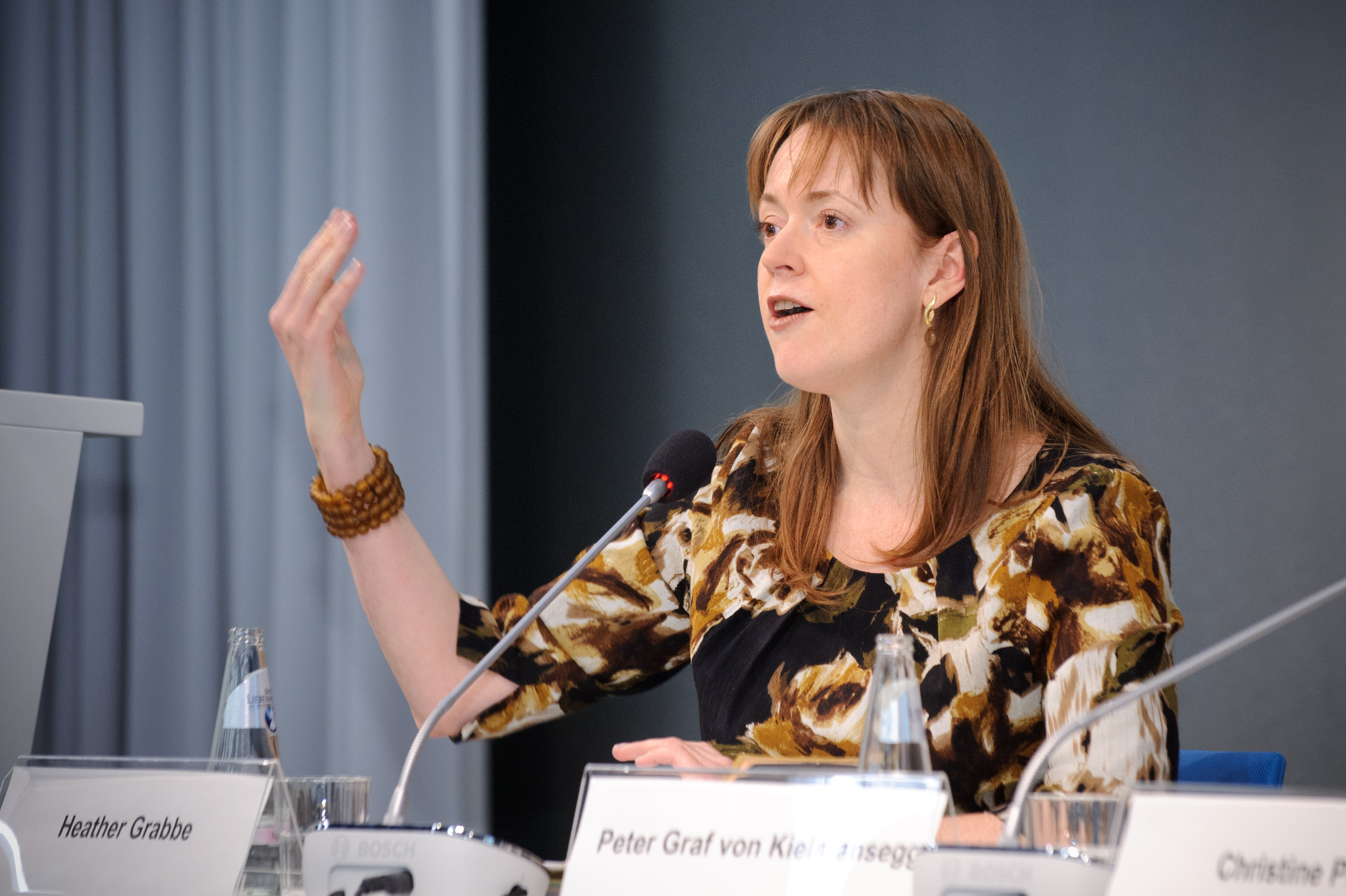
Heather Grabbe, 2011

Heather Mary Claire Grabbe (born 30 August 1970) is Senior Fellow at the think-tank Bruegel in Brussels, Belgium. Since 2021, she is Visiting Professor at University College London and at Katholieke Universiteit Leuven. She was previously the director of the Open Society European Policy Institute.

== Education and early career in the United Kingdom ==
Grabbe was born on 30 August 1970 in Pasadena, California, United States. She studied philosophy, politics and economics at Somerville College, Oxford University, graduating with a Bachelor of Arts (BA) degree in 1991. From 1993 to 1995, she worked as an editor for Oxford Analytica.

Between 1996 and 1998 she was a Research Fellow at Chatham House, the Royal Institute of International Affairs, where she co-authored the first major book on enlargement of the European Union to post-communist Europe, Enlarging the EU Eastwards, with Kirsty Hughes.

Grabbe went on to conduct academic research at the European University Institute in Florence, the European Union Institute for Security Studies in Paris, the Centre for International Relations in Warsaw, and Wolfson College, Oxford University. In 2002 she completed her PhD thesis - a study of EU influence in the post-communist countries seeking membership - at the University of Birmingham, UK.

Between 2000 and 2004, Grabbe was deputy director of the Centre for European Reform, where she published extensively on EU enlargement and its implications, as well as work on transition in Central and South-Eastern Europe; the development of the EU’s new policies on justice, liberty and security; the EU’s institutions and budget; and EU foreign and security policies. In 2005, European Voice (forerunner of POLITICO Europe) described her as the most quotable analyst for EU affairs, adding that "she consistently offers accessible, but not over-simplistic, insights on a range of EU political questions."

She lectured on the political economy of EU enlargement at the London School of Economics until 2005.

Grabbe has authored several seminal studies of the EU enlargement process, including the 2006 book, The EU's transformative power: Europeanization through conditionality in Central and Eastern Europe.

== Career in Brussels ==
Between 2004 and 2009, Grabbe worked as senior advisor to then European Commissioner for Enlargement Olli Rehn. In an interview with POLITICO Europe, Grabbe reported that Rehn offered her the job in 2004 saying "You’ve done all this work on how the EU transformed Hungary, how about trying to do the same for Bosnia and Turkey?". Grabbe was responsible in his cabinet for policy on Balkans countries and later Turkey.

In 2009, the Hungarian-born American philanthropist George Soros invited Grabbe to work for his Open Society Foundations. Grabbe explained that she was attracted by the idea of working on a broad spectrum of issues and by Soros’ "willingness to champion unpopular causes." She was the director of the Open Society European Policy Institute, the EU policy and advocacy branch of the Open Society Foundations network based in Brussels from 2009-22. The Open Society European Policy Institute analyzed EU policies and decisions on a wide range of issues related to democracy, justice, human rights and accountability, and made recommendations on what EU decision-makers and legislators should do to maintain and promote open societies in Europe and elsewhere in the world.

In her time at Open Society, Grabbe analyzed and commented widely on trends and challenges affecting Europe, particularly the impact of populist radical right parties, the digital transformation, and the transition to a carbon-neutral economy.

In 2014, when populist parties obtained unprecedented support in the European Parliament elections, Grabbe analyzed the negative influence that these parties’ agendas and rhetoric would have on Europe’s open society. Together with senior diplomat Stefan Lehne, she warned that radical right populism fundamentally undermines European integration. They recommended that EU leaders and institutions engage citizens directly to address real-world challenges, instead of giving disproportionate attention to issues that the populist rhetoric magnified, such as migration. She argued that populism thrived because of the political instrumentalization of socio-economic inequalities, and because of insecurity due to globalization and digital transformations. According to Grabbe, the key to address both the root causes of populism and citizens’ grievances is for the EU focus on the "Big 3 challenges" around planet, lifetime and technology.

In 2018, she spoke at TEDx Brussels and in the Belgian Senate's Superdemocracy series on the importance of critical thinking and mindful engagement with post-truth politics, and how technology is affecting the openness of societies and quality of democracy.

In 2019-2021, as the EU committed itself to the "European Green Deal" to make the transition to a carbon-neutral economy, Grabbe highlighted the importance of making it a "fair transition". She spoke about the importance of fairness towards the most vulnerable in society, towards the global South, and between the present and future generations. She also highlighted the urgency of deepening democratic engagement to demonstrate to citizens "that climate inaction will only deepen social and economic injustices, while pursuing a low-carbon transition will offer new jobs and opportunities."

Grabbe’s work has been published in, among others, the Financial Times, The New York Times, The Wall Street Journal, and The Guardian.

In 2017, POLITICO Europe ranked her highly among "the women who shape Brussels".

== Personal life ==
In 1994, she married Andrew Wilson, and academic and classical archaeologist. Together they had two daughters. They divorced in 2009.

== Bibliography ==
- Grabbe, Heather (2021). "Normative, Protective, Transformative Europe: Digital and Climate Meta-Policies". In Chad Damro, Elke Heins, Drew Scott (Eds.), European Futures - Challenges and Crossroads for the European Union of 2050. Routledge. ISBN 978-0-367-44438-9.
- Grabbe, Heather (2020). "Lessons from 1989 for the Forthcoming Climate Transition". In Joanna Fomina, Józef Niżnik (Eds.), Europe on test: the onus of the past (pp. 109-115). Polska Akademia Nauk. ISBN 978-83-63305-87-1.
- Grabbe, Heather; Lehne, Stefan (2019-12-18). Climate Politics in a Fragmented Europe. Carnegie Europe.
- Grabbe, Heather; Valášek, Tomáš (Eds.) (2019). Refocus the European Union: Planer, Lifetime, Technology. Carnegie Europe.
- Fieschi, Catherine; Grabbe, Heather (Eds.) (2019). The European Way of Digital: How to make tech work for open societies in Europe. Counterpoint. ISBN 978-1-9999611-2-1.
- Grabbe, Heather; Lehne, Stefan (2018-12-11). 2019 European Parliament Elections Will Change the EU’s Political Dynamics. Carnegie Europe.
- Grabbe, Heather; Lehne, Stefan (2018-10-11). Could an Illiberal Europe Work?. Carnegie Europe.
- Fieschi, Catherine; Grabbe, Heather (Eds.) (2018). Tentacles of Circumstance: The political consequences of inequality. Counterpoint, Open Society European Policy Institute.
- Grabbe, Heather; Lehne, Stefan (2017-09-04). Defending EU Values in Poland and Hungary. Carnegie Europe.
- Grabbe, Heather; Lehne, Stefan (2017-03-17).The Closing of the European Mind. Carnegie Europe.
- Grabbe, Heather (2017). "Enlargement Policy Towards Central and Eastern Europe: What EU Policy-Makers Learned". In Haakon A. Ikonomou, Aurélie Andry, Rebekka Byberg (Eds.), European Enlargement across Rounds and Beyond Borders. Routledge. ISBN 9781138208209.
- Grabbe, Heather; Lehne, Stefan (2016-06-14). Can the EU Survive Populism?. Carnegie Europe.
- Grabbe, Heather; Lehne, Stefan (2015-01-26). Emotional Intelligence for EU Democracy. Carnegie Europe.
- Bartlett, Jamie; Grabbe, Heather (2015). E-democracy in the EU: the opportunities for digital politics to re-engage voters and the risks of disappointment. Demos. ISBN 9781909037984.
- Grabbe, Heather; Groot, Nadja (2014). "Populism in the European Parliament: What implications for the open society?". The International Spectator, 49 (4): 33–46. doi:10.1080/03932729.2014.961768. ISSN 0393-2729.
- Fieschi, Catherine; Grabbe, Heather (Eds.) (2014). The Bridges Project: New expertise for policy in a world of uncertainty. Counterpoint. ISBN 978-1-909499-08-9.
- Grabbe, Heather (2006). The EU’s Transformative Power: Europeanization through Conditionality in Central and Eastern Europe. Palgrave Macmillan UK. doi:10.1057/9780230510302. ISBN 978-1-4039-4903-5.
- Grabbe, Heather (2001). "How does Europeanization affect CEE governance? Conditionality, diffusion and diversity". Journal of European Public Policy, 8 (6): 1013-1031. doi:10.1080/13501760110098323.
