= Joanna Bruck =

Archaeologist

Joanna Bruck MRIA FBA

Academic background
- Education: University of Cambridge
- Thesis: The early-middle bronze age transition in Wessex, Sussex and the Thames Valley (1997)

Academic work
- Discipline: Archaeologist
- Sub-discipline: Prehistory; landscape archaeology; Bronze Age Europe
- Institutions: Clare Hall, Cambridge; University College Dublin; University of Bristol

Joanna Bruck MRIA FBA is an archaeologist and academic whose specialty is Bronze Age Britain and Ireland. Since 2020, she has been Professor of Archaeology and Head of the School of Archaeology at University College Dublin. She was previously Professor of Archaeology at the University of Bristol between 2013 and 2020.

== Education ==
Bruck studied archaeology and anthropology at the University of Cambridge, graduating with a Bachelor of Arts (BA) degree. She remained at Cambridge to undertake postgraduate studies in archaeology and completed a Doctor of Philosophy (PhD) degree in 1997. Her doctoral thesis was titled "The early-middle bronze age transition in Wessex, Sussex and the Thames Valley", and was supervised by Marie Louise Stig Sorensen.

== Career ==
Bruck was a junior research fellow at Clare Hall, Cambridge from 1997 to 1999. She then moved to University College Dublin, where she had been appointed a lecturer in archaeology in 1999. By 2006, she had been promoted to senior lecturer. In 2013, she moved to the University of Bristol where she had been appointed Reader in Archaeology. She was promoted to Professor of Archaeology at Bristol, before returning University College Dublin as Professor of Archaeology and Head of the School of Archaeology in 2020.

Her research themes have included the body and personhood, landscape, domestic architecture, material culture and deposition. More recent work has included nineteenth and twentieth century Ireland, including the 1916 Rising and the archaeology of internment.

She has edited several volumes, including Making Places in the Prehistoric World: Themes in Settlement Archaeology (1999) and Bronze Age Landscapes: Tradition and Transformation (2002).

She has received research funding from the British Academy. In 1999 she co-established the Bronze Age Forum with Stuart Needham. She was previously editor of PAST, the newsletter of the Prehistoric Society. Bruck is on the editorial board of Archaeological Dialogues and vice president of the Prehistoric Society.

== Honours ==
On 22 February 2007, Bruck was elected a Fellow of the Society of Antiquaries of London (FSA). In 2023 she was elected a Member of the Royal Irish Academy (MRIA). In 2025, she was elected an International Fellow of the British Academy (FBA).

== Selected publications ==
- Bruck, J. 2019. Personifying Prehistory. Relational Ontologies in Bronze Age Britain and Ireland. Oxford: OUP.
- Bruck, J. (ed.) 2002. Bronze Age Landscapes: Tradition and Transformation. Oxford: Oxbow.

=== Articles ===
- Brück, J. 1995. A place for the dead: the role of human remains in Late Bronze Age Britain. Proceedings of the Prehistoric Society 61
- Brück, J. 1999. Ritual and rationality: some problems of interpretation in European archaeology. European Journal of Archaeology 2.3: 313-344.
- Brück, J. 2001. Monuments, power and personhood in the British Neolithic. Journal of the Royal Anthropological Institute 7.4: 649-667.
- Brück, J. 2004. Material metaphors: the relational construction of identity in Early Bronze Age burials in Ireland and Britain. Journal of Social Archaeology 4.3: 307-333.
- Brück, J. 2005. Experiencing the past? The development of a phenomenological archaeology in British prehistory. Archaeological Dialogues 12(1), 45-72.
