= Fedir Androshchuk =

Ukrainian archaeologist (born 1970)

- Федір Олександрович Андрощук
- Born: February 20, 1970; Kyiv
- Education: Taras Shevchenko National University of Kyiv
- Scientific career
- Institutions: National Museum of the History of Ukraine

Fedir Androshchuk (Ukrainian: Федір Олександрович Андрощук; born February 20, 1970, in Kyiv) is a Ukrainian archaeologist specialist in the field of Scandinavian studies, director of the National Museum of the History of Ukraine since 2020, member of the executive board of the European Association of Archaeologists since 2022.

== Biography ==
Fedir Androshchuk was born on February 20, 1970, in the city of Kyiv.

In 1988, he entered the Faculty of History of Taras Shevchenko National University of Kyiv, which he graduated in 1995. During 1987–1988, 1990–1996, he worked at the NASU Institute of Archaeology of Ukraine. He led the Shestovitsky and Kaniv expeditions of Taras Shevchenko National University (1993, 1996–1997). From 1996 to 2000, he worked as a teacher at the Department of Archeology and Museum Studies of the same university.

In 1998 Androshchuk defended his candidate's thesis on the topic of historical and cultural relations between Middle Dnieper and Scandinavia, which was published as a book in 1999 under the title "Normans and Slavs in Podesenna". In the same year, he was invited by Stockholm University for a scientific internship in Sweden and the excavation of the Viking city of Birka.

During his stay abroad, he became interested in the history of Scandinavian weapons as a historical source for the study of contacts between the populations of Eastern and Northern Europe during the Viking Age. During 2000–2007, he processed the funds of almost all major museum collections in Denmark, Iceland, Norway and Sweden. The results of these studies were published in separate books in 2013 and 2014.

Since 2000, Fedir Androshchuk's activities have been associated with several institutions in Sweden: Stockholm University (2000-2007), Swedish History Museum (2000-2006; 2014-2019), City Museum Sigtuna (2006, 2010, 2011), Uppsala University (2009—2014) and the private consulting enterprise Arkeologikonsult (2007–2009).

In 2013 and 2016 The books "Vikings in the East" and "Byzantium and the Viking World" were published in English by the publishing house of Uppsala University. In 2012, he was elected a valid member of the research panel of the Swedish Institute in Istanbul, and in 2017, a delegate from Sweden at the 18th Viking Congress.

In 2004, on the initiative of Fedir Androshchuk, an exhibition of copies of rune stones "Vikings on the Eastern Way" was held on the basis of the National Museum of the History of Ukraine. Most of the museum's exhibits were included in the catalog "Scandinavian Antiquities of Southern Russia", which was published in Paris in 2012. Cooperation with the employees of the museum and the NASU Institute of Archaeology were the main prerequisites for the release of both this catalog and the books "Vikings in the East" and "Viking Swords". The monograph "Swords of the Vikings" became the basis of the doctoral dissertation, which Fedir Androshchuk defended at the NASU Institute of Archaeology in 2014. (the opponent was Anatoly Kirpichnikov).

In addition to history and archeology, Fedir Androshchuk's scientific interests include issues of early medieval numismatics. During 2014-2017, on the basis of the State Historical Museum of Sweden, he managed scientific projects aimed at studying silver Byzantine coins and their Scandinavian and Russian imitations. The results of this work were published in the book "Images of Power", which was presented in October 2016 at the National Kyiv-Pechersk Historical and Cultural Reserve.

In 2017, the Kyiv publishing house Laurus published the book "Oseberg: Mysteries of the Royal Mound" by Fedir Androshchuk.

Androshchuk was published in the leading Ukrainian mass media on topics related to current issues of cultural heritage preservation, monument protection, and development of museums.

In 2020 elected as general director of the National Museum of the History of Ukraine. In his program and public speeches, he emphasizes the study of the Scandinavian experience in Ukrainian museology.

In 2020, the Laurus publishing house published the book "Harald Hardrada — the last Viking", in which Fedir Androschuk describes the life of the Norwegian king XI century.

After the beginning of the Russian invasion of Ukraine Androschuk was involved in saving the collections of both the museums he headed and other museums in the country. EAA evaluated his activities during this period as follows: "The efforts joint during the first weeks to protect and evacuate artefacts allowed for the safeguard of dozens of thousands of archaeological materials in danger, only in the National Museum of the History of Ukraine, almost 120.000. Its team not only rushed to protect archaeological heritage in the first moments of the attack, helping other regional museums to do so, but as soon as it was safer, it has continued to conduct research, to open new exhibitions and to organise outreach activities, while monitoring looting cases".

September 1, 2022 was elected a member of the executive board of European Association of Archaeologists, the most powerful organization of professional archaeologists in Europe.

In 2024 Fedir left Ukraine on a business trip and did not return. He later stated that he was "on a business trip not in Sweden, but in Ukraine" and that he resigned from the National Museum because they were unable to extend his business trip, which was necessary to carry out the research project "Sweden and Ukraine in the History of Museum Collections and Exhibition Narratives" supported by Sweden.

== Personal life ==
Androschuk has citizenship of Ukraine and Sweden. He speaks Ukrainian, Russian, English and Swedish.

== Awards ==
- 2016 – Certificate of thanks from the Minister of Culture of Ukraine for facilitating the return of the "Viking Sword" to Ukraine.
- 2023 – Individual Archaeological Heritage Prize of the European Association of Archaeologists for leadership in the protection of Ukrainian archaeological heritage during the war, for commitment to raise awareness about the importance of archaeological heritage in these difficult moments and for overall professional and scientific profile.

== Bibliography ==
=== Monographs ===
1. Музей і національний проєкт. — Київ, 2024. ISBN 978-966-136-957-2
2. Від вікінгів до Русі. — Київ: Laurus, 2022.
3. Десятинна церква — відома та невідома. — Київ: Laurus, 2021.
4. Гаральд Суворий — останній вікінг. — Київ: Laurus, 2020.
5. Осеберг: загадки королевского кургана. — Київ: Laurus, 2017.
6. Images of Power: Byzantium and Nordic Coinage, Paris-Kyiv 2016, c. 995–1035.
7. Byzantium and the Viking World (Studia Byzantina Upsaliensia 18). Co-edited with Jonathan Shepard and Monica White, Uppsala 2016.
8. Swords and Social Aspects of Weaponry in Viking Age societies, Stockholm 2014.
9. Vikings in the East: Essays on the Contacts along the Road to Byzantium, Uppsala 2013.
10. Мечи викингов. — Київ, 2013.
11. Скандинавские древности Южной Руси. Каталог. — Paris, 2012.
12. Нормани і слов'яни у Подесенні. Моделі культурної взаємодії доби раннього середньовіччя. — Київ, 1999.

== Interviews, publications and comments in mass media ==
- ‘Cultural catastrophe’: Ukrainians fear for art and monuments amid onslaught // The Guardian, 1.03.2022
- ‘You can't get back specimens’: Ukrainian scientists rush to save irreplaceable collections // Science (American Association for the Advancement of Science), 9.03.2022
- Statement by Dr Fedir Androshchuk, Director, National Museum of the History of Ukraine, Kyiv // Irish Museum Association, 11.04.2022
- Kyiv museum curators bravely criticise war by telling stories of its collection's historic objects // The Art Newspaper, 9.05.2022
- ”There was a street gunfight, and several bullets hit the museum.” Director of The National Museum of the History of Ukraine Fedir Androshchuk tells how he hid the collection and waited for looters // babel.ua, 30.05.2022
- War in Europe PDF // British Archaeology, May June 2022
- Про хунвейбінів від національної історії // Prostir.museum, 14.07.2022
- Федір Андрощук, археолог, гендиректор Національного музею історії України. «Найцінніші експонати ми демонтували за добу» // Ukrinform, 07.09.2022
- The Profound Defiance of Daily Life in Kyiv // The New Yorker, 05.01.2023
- La cultura al tempo della guerra: National Museum of the History of Ukraine di Kiev // Artribune, 03.04.2023
- Curating the war: Kyiv museum exhibits objects left by Russian soldiers // The Guardian, 22.04.2023
- 破壊続くウクライナ文化財 ロシア色に染める文化的虐殺 // The Nikkei, 22.05.2023
- War has shown Ukrainians — and the rest of us — why museums are so important for telling our stories // The Guardian, 27.05.2023
- Commentary for a documentary project «Як утворилась держава Русь? | Київ тисячолітній. Місто, де починалась історія Русі. Ч.2.», 22.09.2023
- «Якщо музей потрібен, тільки щоб привести гостей, — створіть краще склад»: директор Національного музею історії Федір Андрощук // Ukrainska Pravda, 30.10.2023
