= Maksym Yevhenovych Levada =

Ukrainian archaeologist specializing in heritage protection

Maksym Yevhenovych Levada (Ukrainian: Максим Євгенович Левада) is a Ukrainian archaeologist noted for leading a wartime initiative to monitor and combat the illicit trade in antiquities and for public outreach on the protection of cultural heritage. In 2025, he received the European Archaeological Heritage Prize (individual category) from the European Association of Archaeologists.

== Career and heritage work ==
Since 2022, Levada has headed a heritage-monitoring unit at the National Museum of the History of Ukraine that tracks the trafficking of antiquities on domestic and international platforms and works with law-enforcement bodies. According to a 2025 profile in the Kyiv Post, the team has helped recover more than 15,500 artifacts and filed over 130 criminal complaints in coordination with the Prosecutor General’s Office.

Levada has also worked with Ukrainian authorities on recovering artifacts trafficked abroad. In 2019, he was cited in The Day discussing the reappearance of a Bronze Age helmet in the United Kingdom and broader challenges in protecting Ukrainian heritage from smuggling. In 2020, he helped present seized artifacts dating from the 4th–5th centuries AD to the National Museum of the History of Ukraine, in cooperation with law enforcement.

== Parliamentary and legislative context ==
In December 2021, Levada presented evidence to the Verkhovna Rada’s Committee on Humanitarian and Information Policy during hearings titled Preservation of archaeological heritage and other cultural values: analysis, problems and proposals for their regulation. In his remarks, he addressed gaps in the legal framework for preventing illicit excavations and trafficking and suggested measures to strengthen enforcement and interagency cooperation.

Earlier in his career, Levada also contributed to discussions on draft laws aimed at countering illegal excavations and restricting circulation of archaeological objects, drawing responses from other scholars in Ukrainian archaeological forums.

== Publications and public outreach ==
Levada has published on Ukrainian archaeology, including work on the Serakhovychi hoard in Materials and Research on Archaeology of Prykarpattia and Volhynia. He has also curated exhibitions of recovered artifacts aimed at raising public awareness of heritage protection.

In 2022, his wartime diary from Kyiv was translated into German and published by the Federal Agency for Civic Education as part of its Deutschland Archiv series.
