= Eszter Bánffy =

Hungarian historian and archaeologist (born 1957)

- Born: 1957 (age 68–69)
- Occupations: Historian, archaeologist, academic
- Awards: "Révay" Prize (1986); Kuzsinszky Bálint Memorial Medal (2007); Field Discovery Award (2017); Félix Neubergh Prize (2018); Flóris Rómer Plaque (2020); Europa Prize (2022)

Eszter Bánffy, FSA, FBA (born 1957) is a Hungarian archaeologist and prehistorian whose research focuses on the Neolithic and Chalcolithic periods of Central and Southeastern Europe. Her work includes prehistoric archaeology, geoarchaeology, bioarchaeology, landscape archaeology, the emergence of food production, and prehistoric ritual practices.

Bánffy has held research positions at the Institute of Archaeology of the Hungarian Academy of Sciences and has been associated with the University of Szeged. From 2013 to 2023, she served as director of the Romano-Germanic Commission of the German Archaeological Institute in Frankfurt. She was elected president of the European Association of Archaeologists in 2020 and has been a fellow of the British Academy, the Society of Antiquaries of London and the European Academy of Sciences and Arts

== Education and academic career ==
Bánffy was born on 27 March 1957. She studied at Eötvös Loránd University in Budapest, where she received a degree in prehistoric and medieval archaeology in 1980 and a degree in Indology and comparative Indo-European linguistics in 1982. She also studied English philology, completing a bachelor's degree in 1977. In 1983, she continued her studies at Heidelberg University.

In 1988, Bánffy received the Candidate of Sciences (PhD) degree in archaeology from the Hungarian Academy of Sciences. She received the Doctor of Sciences degree from the academy in 2005 and completed her habilitation at the University of Szeged in 2009, and a second habilitation followed at the Eötvös Loránd University, School of History and Archaeology in 2021.

== Academic and research career ==
Bánffy began her research career at the Institute of Archaeology of the Hungarian Academy of Sciences. She worked there as a research assistant from 1986 to 1988 and subsequently as a senior research associate. From 2001 to 2008 she headed the scientific department, and from 2008 to 2011 she served as deputy (scientific) director. She became a scientific advisor at the institute in 2005.

Bánffy has been an honorary professor at the University of Szeged since 2009 and has supervised graduate research in archaeology and geoarchaeology. She was a visiting researcher at Heidelberg University in 2001 and at Harvard University in 2008.

Her research has concentrated on the transition to food-producing societies; on the Neolithic and Copper Age in Europe, particularly the Carpathian Basin. Her work has incorporated archaeological, geoarchaeological and bioarchaeological approaches and has examined settlement, landscape, subsistence, ritual and population mobility.

=== Fieldwork and research projects ===
Bánffy has led and participated in archaeological investigations in western and southern Hungary, including research in the Kerka Valley, western Transdanubia, the Danube–Tisza interfluve and the Neolithic settlement and cemetery complex at Alsónyék-Bátaszék. She was PI of Hungarian Research Fund (OTKA) Projects focusing on the Neolithic transition and the following social changes between 1995-2001; 2008–11, 2011-14. She was the Hungarian PI of the German Research Fund Project “Bevölkerungsgeschichte des Karpatenbeckens in der Jungsteinzeit” between 2010-2015. Her research has examined the development of aDNA ancestry of early farming communities and settlement landscapes in the region. From 2012 to 2017, she served as the Hungarian project leader in the European Research Council project The Times of Their Lives, which sought to develop more precise chronological narratives for changes in the European Neolithic. From 2013 to 2016, she led the Hungarian component of the interdisciplinary project Food Cultures, which examined early farming food technology and palaeodiet in Southeastern Europe.

Her research on the mega-site of Alsónyék was recognised by the Shanghai Archaeology Forum, which selected the work for its 2017 Field Discovery Award.

=== German Archaeological Institute ===
In 2013, Bánffy became the director of the Romano-Germanic Commission (Römisch-Germanische Kommission) of the German Archaeological Institute in Frankfurt am Main. She held the position until 2023.

During her tenure, she directed and participated in international archaeological research projects concerning prehistoric Europe. Her work at the commission included research and collaboration involving archaeological sites and landscapes from Central and Southeastern Europe to the British Isles.

=== Current positions ===
Beginning with 2023, she returned to the Institute of Archaeology, RCH Budapest (from October 2026: rejoined part of the Hungarian Academy of Sciences). Since 2024, she has worked as Head of the Archaeological Sciences of the Austrian Archaeological Institute, Austrian Academy of Sciences.

=== European Association of Archaeologists ===
Bánffy has been active in the European Association of Archaeologists (EAA) since the 1990s. She served as a member of its executive board and as secretary between 2005 and 2011. Between 2020 and 2026, she served as president of the association, becoming the first East European and the first woman to hold the position. She has also served on the ERC Advanced Grant Panel (2015-2018), on editorial boards and scientific committees in European and global archaeology, including the Journal of World Prehistory, Nature & Anthropology, Journal of Archaeological Research, Proceedings of the Prehistoric Society and other archaeological publications.

=== Research and publications ===
Bánffy's publications address the archaeology of the European Neolithic and Copper Age, including the emergence of agriculture, settlement patterns, ritual practices and the interaction of prehistoric communities. Her research has also incorporated scientific approaches including isotope analysis, bioarchaeology and archaeogenetics.

Her books include Cult Objects of the Neolithic Lengyel Culture: Connections and Interpretation (1997), A Peculiar Female Figurine from the Near East: Case Study (2001), The 6th Millennium BC Boundary in Western Transdanubia and Its Role in the Central European Transition (2004), and The Early Neolithic in the Danube–Tisza Interfluve (2013), First Farmers of the Carpathian Basin (2019); The environmental history of the prehistoric Sárköz region in Southern Hungary (2020); The Neolithic of the Sárköz and adjacent regions in Hungary: bioarchaeological studies (2024). In 2014, she established a Monograph Series within the German archaeological Institute titled Confinia et Horizontes, of which she has worked as book editor and series editor. Her later publications have included research on Neolithic settlement, subsistence and population history. She was a co-author in several papers published e.g. in Nature (2015, 2017, 2018, 2021, 2022), Nature Scientific Reports (2017, 2018, 2025); PLOS One (2020).

== Awards ==
Bánffy was awarded the "Révay" prize of the Society for Ancient History in 1986, the Soros "Open Society" Scholarship from 1998 to 1999 as well as the Fulbright Scholarship in 2006. She won the Kuzsinszky Bálint Memorial Medal in 2007 and the Field Discovery Award from Shanghai Archaeology Forum in 2017. On 9 April 2015, Bánffy was elected a Fellow of the Society of Antiquaries of London.

In 2017, she was elected a Corresponding Fellow of the British Academy (FBA), the United Kingdom's national academy for the humanities and social sciences. She is also an elected Member of the European Academy of Sciences and Arts.

In 2018, she was awarded the Félix Neubergh Prize by the University of Gothenburg. She also won the Flóris Rómer Plaque of the Hungarian Archaeological Society in 2020 and the Europa Prize of the Prehistoric Society in 2022.

== Selected works ==
- Bánffy, Eszter (1997). Cult Objects of the Neolithic Lengyel Culture: Connections and Interpretation. David Brown Book Company. ISBN 978-9638046161.
- Bánffy, Eszter (2001). A Unique Prehistoric Figurine of the Near East. Budapest: Archaeolingua Alapítvány. ISBN 978-9638046369.
- Bánffy, Eszter; Bognár-Kutzián, Ida (2007). The late Neolithic tell settlement at Polgár-Csőszhalom, Hungary: the 1957 excavation. BAR International Series (1730). Oxford: Archaeopress. ISBN 978-1407301747.
- Bánffy, Eszter (2013). The Early Neolithic in the Danube-Tisza Interfluve. BAR International Series (2584). Oxford: Archaeopress. ISBN 978-1407312125.
- Bánffy, Eszter (2019). First Farmers of the Carpathian Basin. Changing patterns in subsistence, ritual and monumental figurines. Oxbow, Oxford; Bánffy, E.
- Bánffy, Eszter (2020). The environmental history of the prehistoric Sárköz region in Southern Hungary. Confinia et horizontes 1. Beier und Beran, Langenweißbach;
- E. Bánffy, A. Gramsch (2024): The Neolithic of the Sárköz and adjacent regions in Hungary: bioarchaeological studies. Confinia et Horizontes 2. Beier und Beran, Langenweißbach
