= Anthony Harding (archaeologist) =

British archaeologist (born 1946)

Anthony Harding FBA FSA
- Born: 20 November 1946 (age 79)

Academic background
- Education: University of Cambridge; Charles University in Prague
- Doctoral advisor: John Coles

Academic work
- Discipline: Archaeologist
- Sub-discipline: European prehistory; European Bronze Age; Mycenaean Greece; prehistoric warfare
- Institutions: Durham University; University of Exeter

Anthony Harding FBA FSA (born 20 November 1946) is a British archaeologist specialising in European prehistory. He was a professor at Durham University and the University of Exeter and president of the European Association of Archaeologists between 2003 and 2009. Following his doctoral research on Mycenaean Greece, Harding's work has mainly concerned the European Bronze Age, including major studies of prehistoric warfare and the prehistory of salt.

== Education and career ==
Harding was born in Bromley, Kent in 1946 and studied Classics and prehistoric archaeology at the University of Cambridge and Charles University in Prague. He received his doctorate from Cambridge in 1973, with a dissertation on the northern connections of Mycenaean Greece supervised by John Coles. He taught at Durham University from 1973 to 2004 and was appointed Professor in 1990. In 2004, he moved to the University of Exeter, where he was the Anniversary Professor of Archaeology until his retirement in 2015. He is an Affiliate of the Philosophical Faculty of Charles University, Prague, attached to the Institute for Classical Archaeology.

Harding was elected a Fellow of the Society of Antiquaries in 1981, a Fellow of the British Academy in 2001, and is a corresponding member of the German Archaeological Institute and the Istituto Italiano di Preistoria e Protostoria. He was the president of the European Association of Archaeologists from 2003 to 2009. Following his retirement, he spent a year as guest professor at LMU Munich.

Harding is a member of the Antiquity Trust, which supports the publication of the archaeology journal Antiquity.

== Research ==
Harding's research focuses on prehistoric archaeology, particularly the Bronze Age of central and Eastern Europe. His work includes several volumes on warfare and violence in prehistory (Velim: Violence and Death in Bronze Age Bohemia, 2007; Warriors and Weapons in Bronze Age Europe, 2007) and on the prehistory of salt (Salt in Prehistoric Europe, 2013; Explorations in Salt Archaeology in the Carpathian Zone, 2013, with Valerii Kavruk; and Salt: White Gold in Early Europe, 2021). He has also written two major syntheses about Bronze Age Europe, The Bronze Age of Europe (1979, with John Coles), and European Societies in the Bronze Age (2000). During his stay in Munich, he wrote Bronze Age Lives (2021). He has directed excavations at sites Velim-Skalka in the Czech Republic, Sobiejuchy in Poland, and Baile Figa in Romania, as well as at several prehistoric sites in England.
