= Andrew Wilson (classical archaeologist) =

British classical archaeologist (born 1968)

- Born: 29 February 1968 (age 58); Hertford, United Kingdom
- Education: University of Oxford
- Scientific career
- Fields: Classical archaeology History of technology
- Workplaces: University of Oxford
- Doctoral students: Zena Kamash

Andrew Ian Wilson (born 29 February 1968) is a British classical archaeologist and Head of School of Archaeology at the University of Oxford. He was director of the Oxford Institute of Archaeology from 2009 to 2011. Wilson's main research interests are the economy of the Roman world, Greek and Roman water supply, and ancient technology.

== Early life and education ==
Wilson was educated at the Perse School, Cambridge, and at Corpus Christi College, Oxford, where he studied Literae Humaniores (Classics) from 1987 to 1991. From 1991 to 1993 he worked as a computer consultant for the electronics firm Eurotherm, before returning to Oxford to study for his doctorate (1993 to 1997), a social and technological study on water management and usage in Roman North Africa, supervised by John Lloyd.

== Academic career ==
From 1996 to 2000 he was a Fellow by Examination in Classical Archaeology at Magdalen College, Oxford, and spent nine months at the British School at Rome as a Rome Scholar in 1999 and 2000. In 2000 he became University Lecturer in Roman Archaeology at the University of Oxford, and a Fellow of Wolfson College; and in 2004 was appointed Professor of the Archaeology of the Roman Empire, and Fellow of All Souls College.

Wilson was Director of the Oxford Institute of Archaeology from 2009 to 2011, and was Head of the School of Archaeology from 2013. He is Chairman of the Society for Libyan Studies, and is on the editorial and advisory boards of several periodicals: Ancient West and East; Facta: A journal of Roman Material Culture Studies; and Oxford Journal of Archaeology. With Alan Bowman, he directs the Oxford Roman Economy Project (OxREP).

Wilson's research marshals archaeological data to address historical questions about ancient society, technology and economy. He has co-directed excavations in Rome, Euesperides (modern Benghazi, Libya), and Utica, Tunisia with Josephine Crawley Quinn and Elizabeth Fentress, and has participated in excavation and fieldwork projects in Thamusida, Morocco, on the Tunisian isle of Jerba, in the Libyan desert region Fazzan, Yeronisos on Cyprus and Al-Andarin in Syria. As of 2010, he has published over ninety articles and reviews and is co-editor of the monograph series Oxford Studies in the Roman Economy for Oxford University Press.

== Personal life ==
In 1994, Wilson married Heather Grabbe, a political scientist specialising in the economics of the European Union. Together they had two daughters. They divorced in 2009.

== Recent works ==
Books

- Quantifying the Roman Economy: Methods and Problems, Oxford Studies in the Roman Economy, Vol. 1, Oxford: Oxford University Press, 2009 (co-editor), ISBN 978-0-19-956259-6

Selected articles and book chapters

- Urban Production in the Roman World: The View from North Africa, Papers of the British School at Rome, Vol. 70, 2002, pp. 231–273
- Machines, Power and the Ancient Economy, Journal of Roman Studies, Vol. 92, 2002, pp. 1–32
- The Spread of Foggara-based Irrigation in the Ancient Sahara, in Mattingly, David John; McLaren, Sue; Savage, Elizabeth; al-Fasatwi, Y.; Gadgood, Khaled (eds.), The Libyan Desert: Natural Resources and Cultural Heritage, London: The Society for Libyan Studies, 2006, pp. 205–216, ISBN 978-1-900971-04-1
- The Economic Impact of Technological Advances in the Roman Construction Industry, in Lo Cascio, Elio (ed.), Innovazione tecnica e progresso economico nel mondo romano, Bari: Edipuglia, 2006, pp. 225–236, ISBN 978-88-7228-405-6
- The Metal Supply of the Roman Empire, in Papi, Emanuele (ed.), Supplying Rome and the Roman Empire, Journal of Roman Archaeology, supplement 69, 2007, pp. 109–125, ISBN 978-1-887829-69-4
- Hydraulic Engineering, in Oleson, John Peter (ed.), Handbook of Engineering and Technology in the Classical World, Oxford: Oxford University Press, 2008, pp. 285–318, ISBN 978-0-19-518731-1
- Machines, in Oleson, John Peter (ed.), Handbook of Engineering and Technology in the Classical World, Oxford: Oxford University Press, 2008, pp. 337–366, ISBN 978-0-19-518731-1
- Large-scale Manufacturing, Standardization, and Trade, in Oleson, John Peter (ed.), Handbook of Engineering and Technology in the Classical World, Oxford: Oxford University Press, 2008, pp. 393–417, ISBN 978-0-19-518731-1
- Economy and Trade, in Bispham, Edward (ed.), The Short Oxford History of Europe, Vol. 2: Roman Europe, Oxford: Oxford University Press, 2008, pp. 170–202, ISBN 978-0-19-926601-2
- Villas, Horticulture and Irrigation Infrastructure in the Tiber Valley, in Coarelli, Filippo; Patterson, Helen (eds.), Mercator Placidissimus: The Tiber Valley in Antiquity. New Research in the Upper and Middle River Valley, Proceedings of the Conference Held at the British School at Rome, 27–28 February 2004, Rome: Edizioni Quasar, 2009, pp. 731–768, ISBN 978-88-7140-368-7

== See also ==
- Roman technology
- Roman aqueducts
- List of Roman watermills
