= April Nowell =

Canadian archaeologist (born 1969)

- Born: 1969
- Alma mater: McGill University; University of Pennsylvania
- Occupation: University teacher, anthropologist, archaeologist, scientist
- Employer: University of Victoria

April Nowell (born 1969) is a Paleolithic archaeologist, Professor of Anthropology and Distinguished Lansdowne Fellow at the University of Victoria, Canada. Her research team works on international projects in areas including Jordan, Australia, France, and South Africa.

Nowell's areas of study include Neanderthal lifeways; the archaeology of childhood; the origins of art, symbol use, and language; the development of human cognition and behavior; and the historical development of archaeological theories. Her book Growing Up in the Ice Age (2021) won the 2023 European Association of Archaeologists Book Prize.

== Early life and education ==
Nowell grew up in Montreal, Quebec, Canada. She received a BA from McGill University and did her first field work in Old Montreal. She later worked on sites in Belize, the Canadian Arctic, Ontario, France and Spain.

Nowell earned her PhD from the University of Pennsylvania. Her dissertation examined The archaeology of mind: Standardization and symmetry in lithics and their implications for the study of the evolution of the human mind. (2000).

== Career ==
Nowell is a Professor of Anthropology and Distinguished Lansdowne Fellow at the University of Victoria, Canada. Nowell leads an international research team and collaborates on multiple projects worldwide. Her areas of study include Lower and Middle Paleolithic sites in Jordan, cave art in Australia and France, and ostrich eggshell beads in South Africa.

Nowell has challenged accepted beliefs about hominin artworks, suggesting that not only Homo sapiens but also Neanderthals and Denisovans may have created cave art much earlier than previously believed. In a 2011 study, Nowell and Genevieve von Petzinger unraveled the chain of attributions through which experts on cave art had dated artworks to specific ages. They found that very few artworks had been independently dated based on physical evidence using techniques like radiocarbon dating. More often, estimates of dates of one artwork were based on others, resulting in circular chains of attribution.

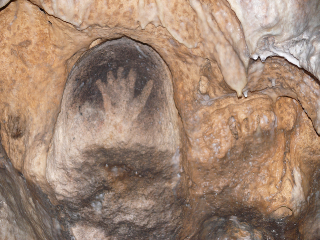
Negative hand, Caves of Gargas, France

Nowell and von Petzinger have also created a database of symbols from more than 200 cave walls in France and Spain, such as Rouffignac, Chauvet and Lascaux. The symbols tended to be ignored next to the caves' vibrant paintings of animals. Documenting their location, time, and relationship to other markings led to the identification of twenty-six specific repeated signs. These included basic shapes like triangles, squares, full circles, semicircles, open angles, crosses and grouped dots, and more complex drawings of negative hands, finger flutings, branch-like penniforms, and hut-like tectiforms. Dating suggests that some signs originally appeared as truncated images of animals, and eventually became symbolic representations of concepts. Surprisingly, symbols often appeared in specific clusters, which were repeated in different caves, such as the combination of a negative hand with finger fluting. Nowell has cautioned: "This is not writing as we know it or language as we understand it. However, in these caves we are looking at the patterning of symbols" substantially predating the first occurrence of writing by 25,000 years.

In Jordan, Nowell's team has worked at the Azraq Basin, an area 100 kilometres (62 mi) east of Amman that was once a wetland oasis, but is now a desert. They have recovered 10,000 well-preserved Middle Pleistocene stone tools, some of which they have examined for traces of protein residue using crossed immunoelectrophoresis (CIEP). In 2016, they identified 17 of the stone tools as having identifiable traces of blood: the earliest that have been found. They showed that at least 250,000 years ago, early humans caught and ate animals ranging from duck to rhinoceros. Time Magazine listed the blood residue work among its top 100 discoveries.

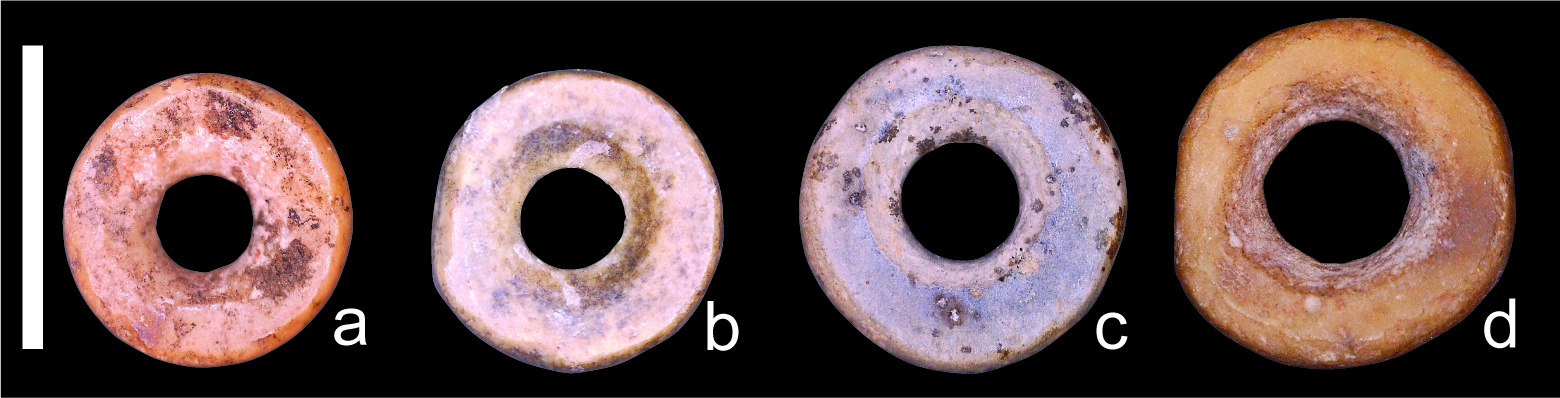
Examples of ostrich eggshell beads found in archaeological contexts in Africa.

In South Africa, Nowell has worked with Benjamin Collins and others on the study of both finished ostrich eggshell beads and OES fragments. Studying fragments has enabled researchers to examine patterns of manufacture and trading of beads among social groups through time. At Grassridge Rockshelter in the Eastern Cape, they have identified both ostrich eggshell beads at all stages of manufacture, and marine shell beads. Since Grassridge is at least 200 kilometres (120 mi) from the coast, this supports the idea that extensive social networks existed during the southern Africa Holocene.

In her examinations of archaeological evidence and visual material culture, Nowell emphasizes the importance of social interaction within communities. She has documented the lives of children, who were present alongside adults during many activities, as shown by evidence from Palaeolithic caves in Europe. Examinations of the archaeological record have typically studied adults rather than children. Nowell's work has challenged the invisibility of children in the Paleolithic archaeological record and filled a significant gap in physical and behavioral anthropology.

Nowell's book Growing Up in the Ice Age has been described as both "illuminating and engaging" and "carefully written and impeccably researched". Nowell's examination of Plio-Pleistocene childhood was awarded the 2023 European Association of Archaeologists Book Prize. The Association stated: "A socially inclusive emphasis on dynamic and diverse childhoods, in which children are seen to have been active social and economic agents, is successfully combined with a wider evolutionary perspective, showing how childcare and socialisation affected the longer trajectory of the human species."

Nowell appears in the NOVA series Ancient Earth (episode 5) and the CBC documentary Little Sapiens.

== Awards and honors ==
- 2023, Distinguished Lansdowne Fellow, University of Victoria, "given to an established researcher in recognition of outstanding, internationally recognized contributions to scholarship in their area of expertise".
- 2023, European Archaeological Association Book Prize, for Growing Up in the Ice Age (2021)

== Selected publications ==
=== Books ===
- Nowell, April, ed. (2022). In the Mind's Eye: Multidisciplinary Approaches to the Evolution of Human Cognition. New York, Oxford: Berghahn Books. doi:10.1515/9781789201697. ISBN 978-1-78920-169-7.
- Nowell, April; Davidson, Iain, eds. (2011). Stone tools and the evolution of the human cognition (First pbk ed.). Boulder, Colo: University Press of Colorado. ISBN 978-1-60732-135-4.
- Gonlin, Nancy; Nowell, April, eds. (2017). Archaeology of the night: life after dark in the ancient world. Boulder (Colo.): University Press of Colorado. ISBN 978-1-60732-677-9.
- Davidson, Iain; Nowell, April, eds. (2021). Making scenes: global perspectives on scenes in rock art. New York: Berghahn Books. ISBN 978-1-78920-920-4.
- Nowell, April (2021). Growing up in the Ice Age: fossil and archaeological evidence of the lived lives of Plio-Pleistocene children. Oxford (GB): Oxbow Books. ISBN 978-1-78925-294-1.
- Collins, Benjamin; Nowell, April, eds. (March 2024). Culturing the Body: Past Perspectives on Identity and Sociality. Berghahn Books. ISBN 978-1-80539-460-0.

=== Papers ===
- d'Errico, Francesco; Nowell, April (April 2000). "A New Look at the Berekhat Ram Figurine: Implications for the Origins of Symbolism". Cambridge Archaeological Journal. 10 (1): 123–167. doi:10.1017/S0959774300000056. ISSN 1474-0540. S2CID 163138037.
- d'Errico, Francesco; Henshilwood, Christopher; Lawson, Graeme; Vanhaeren, Marian; Tillier, Anne-Marie; Soressi, Marie; Bresson, Frédérique; Maureille, Bruno; Nowell, April; Lakarra, Joseba; Backwell, Lucinda; Julien, Michèle (2003). "Archaeological Evidence for the Emergence of Language, Symbolism, and Music—An Alternative Multidisciplinary Perspective". Journal of World Prehistory. 17 (1): 1–70. doi:10.1023/A:1023980201043. ISSN 0892-7537. JSTOR 25801199. S2CID 14442075.
- Henry, Donald O.; Cordova, Carlos; White, J. Joel; Dean, Rebecca M.; Beaver, Joseph E.; Ekstrom, Heidi; Kadowaki, Seiji; McCorriston, Joy; Nowell, April; Scott-Cummings, Linda (May 2003). "The Early Neolithic Site of Ayn Abū Nukhayla, Southern Jordan". Bulletin of the American Schools of Oriental Research. 330 (330): 1–30. doi:10.2307/1357837. JSTOR 1357837. S2CID 163499696.
- Nowell, April (21 October 2010). "Defining Behavioral Modernity in the Context of Neandertal and Anatomically Modern Human Populations". Annual Review of Anthropology. 39 (1): 437–452. doi:10.1146/annurev.anthro.012809.105113. ISSN 0084-6570.
- Petzinger, Genevieve von; Nowell, April (December 2011). "A question of style: reconsidering the stylistic approach to dating Palaeolithic parietal art in France". Antiquity. 85 (330): 1165–1183. doi:10.1017/S0003598X00061986. ISSN 0003-598X. S2CID 163119693.
- Abadía, Oscar Moro; Nowell, April (September 2015). "Palaeolithic Personal Ornaments: Historical Development and Epistemological Challenges". Journal of Archaeological Method and Theory. 22 (3): 952–979. doi:10.1007/s10816-014-9213-z. S2CID 254610058.
- Nowell, April (15 October 2015). "Learning to See and Seeing to Learn: Children, Communities of Practice and Pleistocene Visual Cultures". Cambridge Archaeological Journal. 25 (4): 889–899. doi:10.1017/S0959774315000360. S2CID 164590203.
- Haidle, MN; Bolus, M; Collard, M; Conard, N; Garofoli, D; Lombard, M; Nowell, A; Tennie, C; Whiten, A (20 July 2015). "The Nature of Culture: an eight-grade model for the evolution and expansion of cultural capacities in hominins and other animals". Journal of Anthropological Sciences. 93 (93): 43–70. doi:10.4436/JASS.93011. PMID 26196109.
- Riede, F; Johannsen, NN; Högberg, A; Nowell, A; Lombard, M (January 2018). "The role of play objects and object play in human cognitive evolution and innovation". Evolutionary Anthropology. 27 (1): 46–59. doi:10.1002/evan.21555. PMC 5838546. PMID 29446561.
- Collins, Benjamin; Wojcieszak, Marine; Nowell, April; Hodgskiss, Tammy; Ames, Christopher J. H. (August 2020). "Beads and bead residues as windows to past behaviours and taphonomy: a case study from Grassridge Rockshelter, Eastern Cape, South Africa". Archaeological and Anthropological Sciences. 12 (8): 192. Bibcode:2020ArAnS..12..192C. doi:10.1007/s12520-020-01164-5. S2CID 220837809.
- Nowell, April; Van Gelder, Leslie (1 September 2020). "Entanglements: the Role of Finger Flutings in the Study of the Lived Lives of Upper Paleolithic Peoples". Journal of Archaeological Method and Theory. 27 (3): 585–606. doi:10.1007/s10816-020-09468-5. ISSN 1573-7764. S2CID 225636046.
- Craig, Caitlin; Collins, Benjamin; Nowell, April; Ames, Christopher J. H. (January 2023). "Abrasive wear in heat-treated ostrich eggshell beads: implications for the archaeological record". Archaeological and Anthropological Sciences. 15 (1): 4. Bibcode:2023ArAnS..15....4C. doi:10.1007/s12520-022-01703-2. S2CID 254558129.
- Nowell, April (23 October 2023). "Rethinking Neandertals". Annual Review of Anthropology. 52 (1): 151–170. doi:10.1146/annurev-anthro-052621-024752. ISSN 0084-6570.
