= Growing Up in the Ice Age =

2023 book by April Nowell about life as a child in the ice age

Growing Up in the Ice Age: Fossil and Archaeological Evidence of the Lived Lives of Plio-Pleistocene Children
- Book cover
- Author: April Nowell
- Language: English
- Subject: Archaeology
- Publisher: Oxbow Books
- Publication date: June 14, 2021
- Media type: Print
- Pages: 384
- ISBN: 978-1789252941
- Preceded by: Making Scenes: Global Perspectives on Scenes in Rock Art
- Followed by: In the Mind's Eye: Multidisciplinary Approaches to the Evolution of Human Cognition

Growing up in the Ice Age: Fossil and Archaeological Evidence of the Lived Lives of Plio-Pleistocene Children is a 2021 book by Paleolithic archaeologist, April Nowell who is the Department of Anthropology chair and professor at the University of Victoria. This book examines the role children and adolescents played in the most recent ice age. Nowell argues that they were an important part of the society and more study should be devoted to that role. The book received the 2023 European Association of Archaeologists book award, calling it "a novel contribution to this still underexplored aspect of Palaeolithic societies". The book was published by Oxbow Books.

== Synopsis ==
Nowell's research on Plio-Pleistocene children spans two decades, most from the end of the ice age 40,000 to 10,000 years ago. She writes "that kids are important drivers of human cultural evolution"; they learn from who they want and pass on the knowledge to future generations. Many of the artifacts we have could easily be from children learning to make tools which are necessary to group survival. Over the last two decades the study of children in this period has expanded, finding them to be independent community members.

In 2022, Gregory Tague, reviewing the book, states that in chapter one, Nowell asks and answers the question "when is a child a person?" The answer being that it just depends, as there is "no real social definition of a child or childhood." The examples Nowell has found show that children in the Plio-Pleistocene engaged in "weaving or painstaking metal work" and were involved in rituals. Gender roles were not clearly defined, and oftentimes the items they created as children were smaller versions of items they would use as adults, crafted in ways that could reflect their "personalities and intelligence." In addition, there seems to be evidence that these children had access to and used musical instruments. Because early humans were mostly hairless compared to apes, they would not cling to a mother's back, but be carried in front where they could see faces and learn to "read expressions and emotions". According to Nowell, this would help with social and brain development.

Chapters of the book focus on "the value of investigating child evolution", while another chapter discusses the "growth and life of teenagers in the Ice Age." Nowell feels that understanding children and adolescents from the ice age could help us understand children today. "For example, her findings show that identity crises are not universal for teenagers but that risk taking and innovation are."

According to reviewers Felix Riede and Mathilde Vestergaard Meyer, the book chapters cover the importance of "Pleistocene children as evolutionary agents," play and the objects associated with playing, burials and "the use of space". Storytelling "as a means of learning" can be inferred through examination of cave art. Nowell makes the argument that children also participated in creating this art as well as benefiting from it. The book includes an appendix, "an extensive bibliography and a useful index."

== Background ==
The author's research on children and teenagers began as she became interested in "play behavior", her own children being in their early twenties at the time of the book's publication. Passing on skills to the next generation was as important to the survival of a community then as it is to today. She states that she is also interested in burial patterns for people of the Plio-Pleistocene period and expects to write a book on "anthropology ethics".

In Nowell's Children of the Ice Age 2023 work she writes that there is evidence of children playing tag, "throwing clay balls at each other and at stalagmites" as well as fingerprints from a child as young as six on clay objects that were learning to make clay bowls and toy animals.

== Reception ==
Riede and Meyer describe this book as going beyond Newall's own published work -- she has created a book that is "well illustrated and written in accessible language."

The European Association of Archaeologists presented Newall with their 2023 book award, writing that this book is "fascinating" and "everyone should be able to relate to and learn" from it. They describe that the book is a novel contribution to an area of Palaeolithic society that should have further study.

Tague in his review writes it is a "carefully written and impeccably researched book."
