= European Journal of Archaeology =

- Discipline: Archaeology
- Language: English
- Edited by: Barry Molloy

Publication details
- Former name: Journal of European Archaeology
- History: 1998 — present
- Publisher: Cambridge University Press
- Frequency: Quarterly

Standard abbreviations
- ISO 4: Eur. J. Archaeol.

Indexing
- European Journal of Archaeology
- ISSN: 1461-9571 (print); 1741-2722 (web)
- Journal of European Archaeology
- ISSN: 0965-7665 (print); 2057-7869 (web)

Links
- Journal homepage

European Journal of Archaeology is an international, peer-reviewed academic journal of the European Association of Archaeologists. Since 2017, it has been published by Cambridge University Press. The journal was entitled the Journal of European Archaeology (1993–1997). The journal publishes archaeological research in and around Europe. The journal was published previously by SAGE, Maney and Taylor & Francis. The Journal contains open access articles.

== Editors ==
The following persons are or have been editors:

- John Chapman (1998–2001)
- Mark Pearce (2002–2004)
- Alan Saville (2004–2010)
- Robin Skeates (2011–2019)
- Catherine Frieman (2015-2025)
- Zena Kamash (2026)
- Barry Molloy (2026 onwards)
