= Kirsty Hughes =

Scottish political scientist

Kirsty Hughes Ph.D, FRSE
- Employer: Scottish Centre on European Relations
- Known for: academic, specialist in the policy and relationship between UK, Scotland and Europe

Kirsty Hughes, Ph.D, FRSE is a political scientist, founder and Director of Scottish Centre on European Relations, and a Fellow of the Royal Society of Edinburgh (RSE).

== Research interests and funding issue ==
Hughes is a Scottish academic and writer, specialising in the relationship between the UK and Scotland, in particular, with Europe. She is regularly consulted as an authority in think tanks, by international governments, non-governmental organisations and media, and was made a Fellow of RSE in 2021.

Hughes was formerly a Senior Fellow in Friends of Europe, Brussels and at the Centre for European Policy Studies and the UK Policy Studies Institute, as well as a Research Fellow at WZB Berlin Social Science Centre and was the Director of the European Programme at the UK's Chatham House.

She has researched and written upon the relationships between the UK, Scotland and the EU. She wrote with others from the Centre on Constitutional Change and was consulted in the press and media on Brexit. and has published research on other issues relating to democracy in Europe. Hughes also studied the impact of the Eurozone crisis and the enlargement of the EU to Eastern and Central European members, and commented regarding Turkey's application to the Union.

During the run up to the 2021 Scottish Parliament Election, Hughes has been invited to comment on Scottish policy in relation to future application to the European Economic Area or the EU, should it gain independence from the UK.

She commented that a misunderstanding of the Ireland-UK common travel area was shown in a statement regarding a future 'hard' border between a potential independent Scotland within the EU and an England outside it, characterised as a 'great wall of Gretna' by Home Office Minister Kevin Foster, MP and called this 'simply scaremongering' and 'hypocrisy'.

On 14 July 2021, Hughes announced that research funding was inadequate to continue operating the independent research centre; a decision considered regrettable and untimely by a spokesperson for the European Movement in Scotland, and by Professor Fergal Cochrane of the Conflict Analysis Research Centre at the University of Kent and others. The former head of the European Commission in Scotland, Graham Blythe, be also remarked that the timing was a concern as 'Scottish/European relations are perhaps even more in focus than before.'

Hughes gave evidence with Professor Murray Pittock, and others, to the Scottish Parliament (Holyrood) European Committee investigation into the Scottish Government's international strategy, saying that 'post-Brexit, Scotland had to work harder to gain influence as it no longer had MEPs in Brussels.' and likened it to looking into a room from outside, but also said that this makes 'the case for more focus on Europe (EEA or EU) which remains Scotland's biggest trade partner. EFTA or EU accounts for 'just over 50% of Scotland's trade.' 50% of Scotlands international trade may be with the EU but 65% of all trade is with the rest of the U.K.

== Selected publications ==
- Hughes, K. S. (Ed.). (1993). European competitiveness. Cambridge University Press.
- Estrin, S., Hughes, K., & Todd, S. (1997). Foreign direct investment in Central and Eastern Europe: Multinationals in transition. Royal Institute of International Affairs.
- Grabbe, H., & Hughes, K. (1998). Enlarging the EU Eastward. A&C Black.
- Grabbe, H., & Hughes, K. (1999). Central and east European views on EU enlargement: political debates and public opinion. Back to Europe: Central and Eastern Europe and the European Union, 185–202.
- Hughes, K. (2003). A Dynamic and Democratic EU or Muddling through Again? Assessing the EU's Draft Constitution. EPIN Working Paper No. 8, July 2003.
- Hughes, K. (2004). Turkey and the European Union: Just another enlargement. Exploring the Implications of Turkish Accession http://www. cdu. de/en/doc/Friends_of_Europe_Turkey. pdf.
- Hughes, K. (2020). European Union Views of the UK post-Brexit and of the Future EU-UK Relationship. Scottish Centre on European Relations.
- Heinikoski, S. (2020). Lessons from the EFTA Enlargement: How Would the EU Accession Process Look Today?. In An Independent Scotland in the EU: Issues for Accession (pp. 50–53). Scottish Centre on European Relations.
- Keating, M. (Ed.). (2020) The Oxford Handbook of Scottish Politics. Oxford University Press, Chapter 33 p. 618
