= Jennifer Baird =

British archaeologist and academic

Jennifer Baird FSA
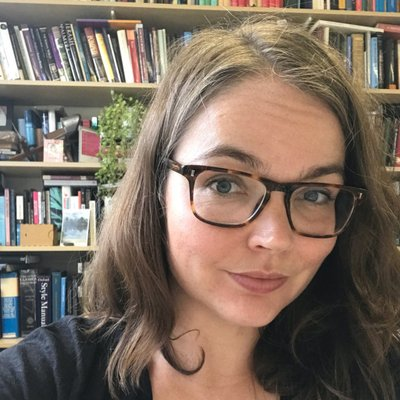
- Professor Jennifer A. Baird

Academic background
- Education: University of Leicester

Academic work
- Discipline: Archaeology
- Sub-discipline: Roman archaeology; Roman provinces; Dura-Europos
- Institutions: Birkbeck, University of London

Jennifer Baird, FSA is a British archaeologist and academic. She is Professor in Archaeology at Birkbeck, University of London. Her research focuses on the archaeology of Rome's eastern provinces, particularly the site of Dura-Europos.

== Career ==
Baird completed a PhD at the University of Leicester, graduating in 2006, with a thesis entitled: 'Housing and households at Dura-Europos: a study in identity on Rome's Eastern Frontier', supervised by Simon James. Baird was a Leverhulme Early Career Fellow at the University of Leicester. She joined Birkbeck in 2008. She is a Fellow of the Higher Education Academy. Baird co-directs the Roman Knossos Project, undertaking archaeological research in Crete. Baird has edited several volumes including Ancient Graffiti in Context (2011).

Baird has excavated at the site of Dura-Europos, work which lead to her 2014 and 2018 publications on the site.

Baird delivered the AIA Lecture on "From Aphlad to Zeus: The Archaeology of Diversity at Dura-Europos" at the University of British Columbia on 12 March 2019.

== Honours and awards ==
Baird was elected a Fellow of the Society of Antiquaries of London (FSA) in 2013.

== Selected publications ==
=== Books ===
- Baird, J. A. and C. Taylor, eds. 2010, Ancient Graffiti in Context. New York: Routledge.
- Baird, J. A. 2014, The Inner Lives of Ancient Houses: An Archaeology of Dura-Europos. Oxford: Oxford University Press.
- Baird, J. A. 2018, Dura-Europos. Bloomsbury Archaeological Histories Series. London: Bloomsbury.

=== Journal articles ===
- Baird, J. A. 2007, "Shopping, Eating and Drinking in Dura Europos: Reconstructing Context." in Luke Lavan, Ellen Swift, Toon Putzeys (ed.), Objects in Context, Objects in Use: Material Spatiality in Late Antiquity. Late Antique Archaeology, v. 5. Leiden/Boston: Brill, 2007. ISBN 9789004165502 p. 411-37.
- Baird, J. A. 2012, "Re-excavating the Houses of Dura-Europos" Journal of Roman Archaeology 25: 146–169.
- Baird, J. A. 2015, "On Reading the Material Culture of Ancient Sexual Labour" Helios 42.1: 163–175.
- Baird, J. A. 2016, "Everyday Life in Roman Dura-Europos: The Evidence of Dress Practices" in Ted Kaizer (ed.), Religion, Society and Culture at Dura-Europos. Yale Classical Studies, 38. (Cambridge; New York) ISBN 978-1-107-12379-3 p. 30-56.
- Baird, J.A. 2016, "Private Graffiti? Scratching the Walls of Houses at Dura-Europos" in Rebecca Benefiel, Peter Keegan (ed.), Inscriptions in the Private Sphere in the Greco-Roman World. Brill studies in Greek and Roman epigraphy, 7. Leiden; Boston: Brill, 2016. ISBN 9789004307117 p. 13-31.
- Baird, J and Z Kamash, 2019, 'Remembering Roman Syria: Valuing Tadmor‐Palmyra, from ‘Discovery’ to Destruction' Bulletin of the Institute of Classical Studies 62.1, p. 1-29.
