= Temple of Zeus Megistos =

Temple located in block C4 at Dura-Europos

Coordinates: 34°44′50″N 40°43′58″E

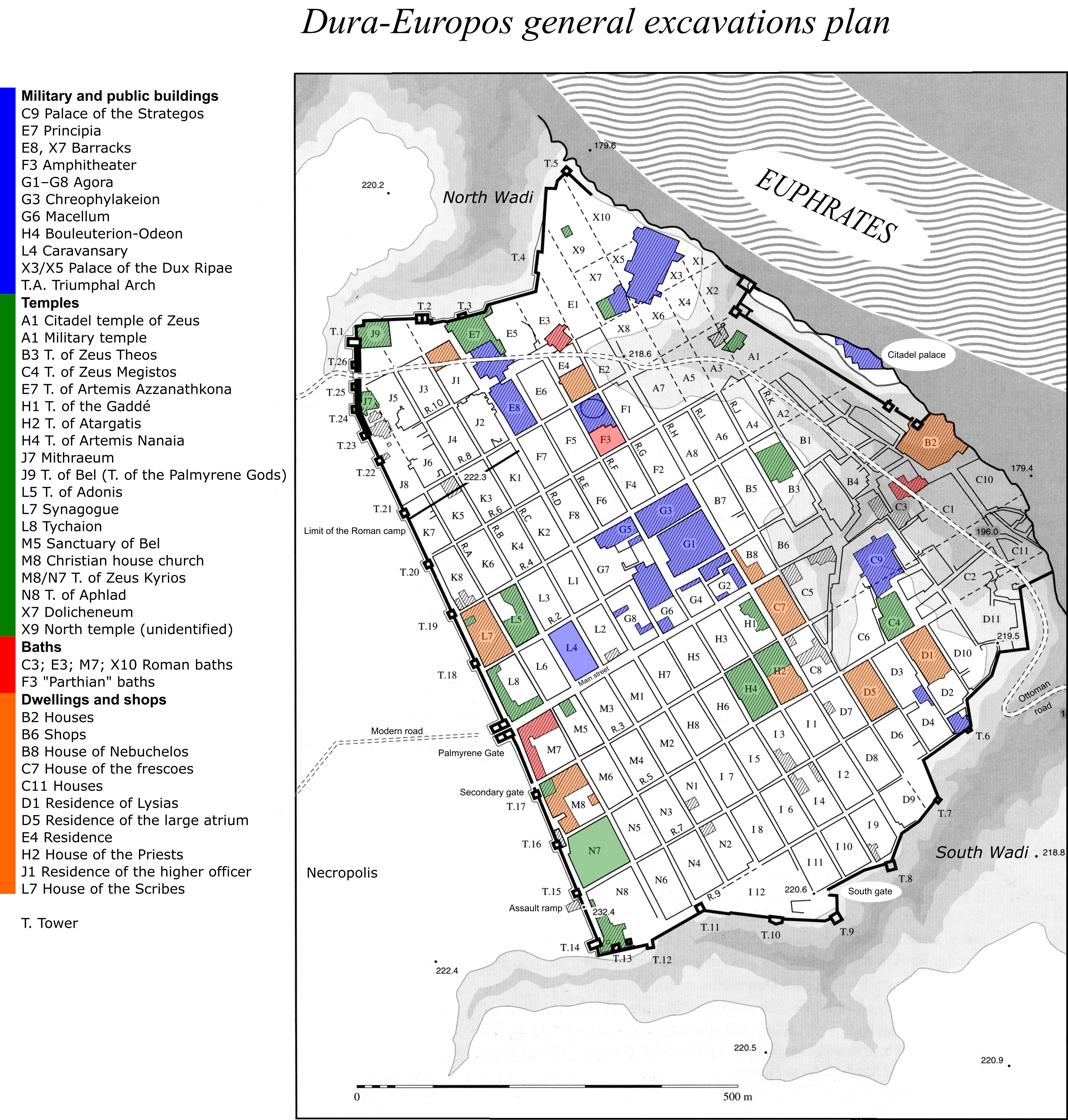
Dura-Europos general excavations plan, Temple of Zeus Megistos is marked as C4

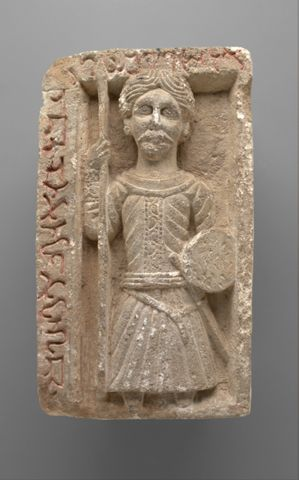
Stele with the image of Arsu

The Temple of Zeus Megistos is in Dura-Europos in the east of the city in a part of the city that is modernly referred to as the Acropolis. It was one of the main temples of the city, the oldest construction phases of which perhaps go back to the time when the city was under Greek rule (from about 300 to 114 BC). The temple is not well preserved and the results of its excavations are not fully published. Several times the temple has been the target of excavations. The first excavations took place in 1928–37. The ceramics have hardly been recorded, which makes dating the older layers more difficult. The excavators presented some reconstructions of the oldest Greek temple. In particular, the more recent excavations from 1992 and 2002 raise doubts about older reconstructions and interpretations.

In its final phase, which dates from AD 169/170, the temple takes up most of a street block (C4). The main entrance is in the south. The majority of the complex consists of various smaller chapels; in the west part there is a cella and in the north-east there is a large courtyard with a portico in the north.

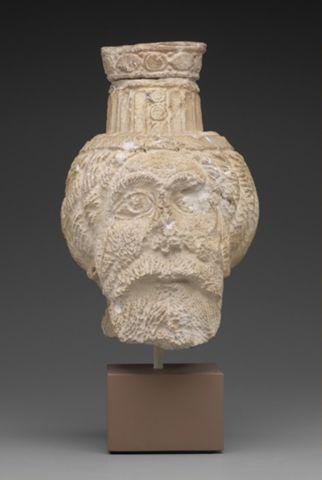
Head, perhaps of Zeus Megistos

According to older reconstructions, there was initially a sanctuary with a courtyard, an altar and three cellae. The reconstruction shows a temple that combines Hellenistic and Iranian elements. This reconstruction is problematic and it is not even certain whether a temple stood here in Greek times. The assignment of the temple to Zeus Megistos is based only on a dedicatory inscription, according to which parts of the building were made by Seleucus, Strategos (strategos kai epistates) of the city, rebuilt and consecrated to God. The inscription dates to AD 169/170 and tells of numerous construction works on the temple, perhaps after it was destroyed by an earthquake. Probably then the building received its final form. The founder Seleukos was practically a governor in Dura-Europos and belonged to a Greek family who held this office for several generations. The governor family's house was right next to the temple. Other members of the governor family, such as Lysias, are also mentioned in inscriptions, but no titles are mentioned, so there is a possibility that these are other people of the same name who did not belong to the governor's family.

Various reliefs and sculptures come from the temple. A rectangular stele shows the god Arsu. According to the dedication inscription in Palmyrian, the stele was made by the sculptor Oga. Various statues of Heracles were also found in the sanctuary. This seems to indicate that a number of deities and not just Zeus Megistus were worshiped here. Perhaps important members of wealthy families even had individual, private chapels here that only they were allowed to enter.
