= Catherine Frieman =

Archaeologist and researcher

Catherine J. Frieman
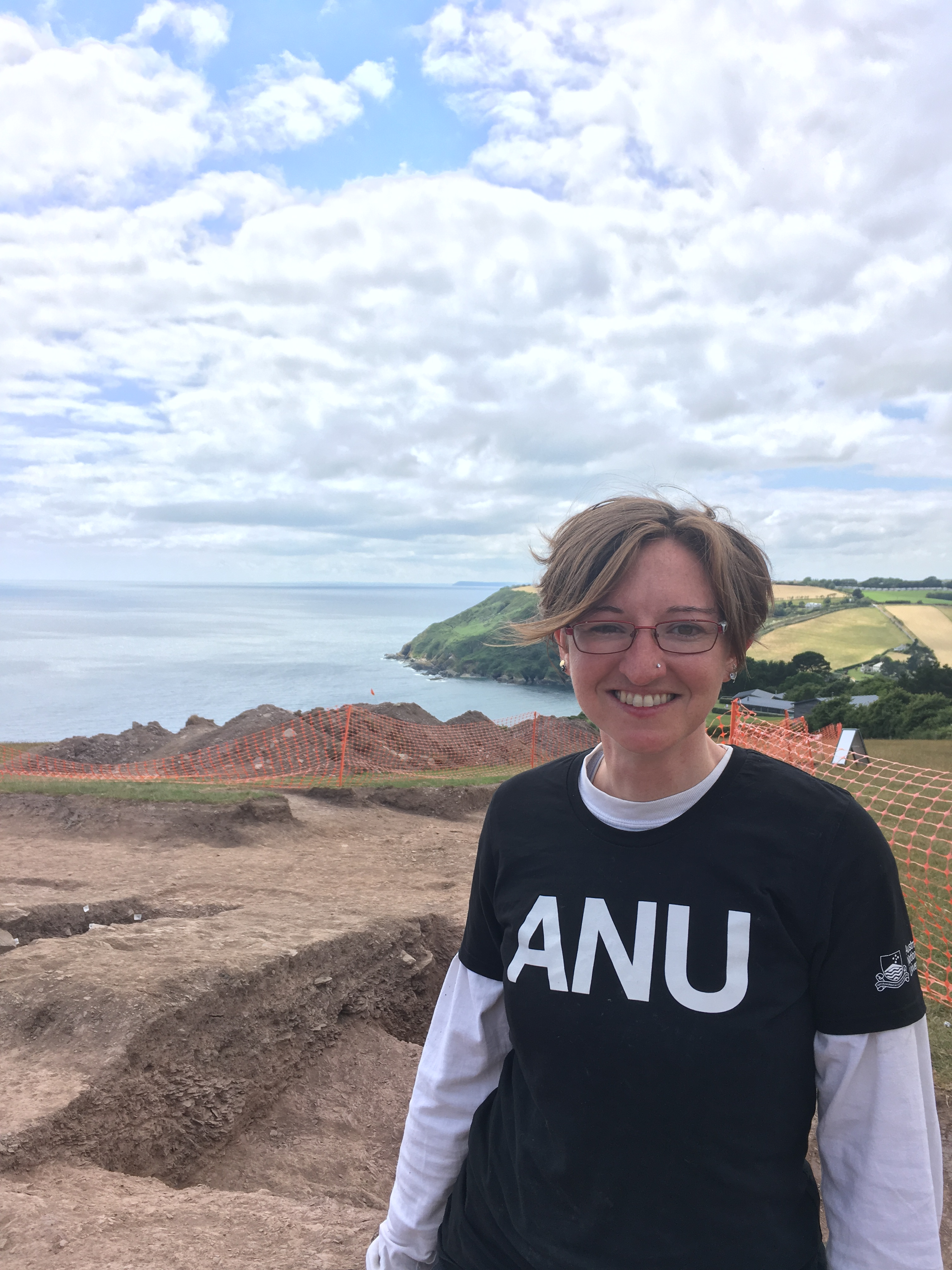
- Frieman at Talland Round in June 2019
- Occupation: Archaeologist

Academic background
- Education: Yale University; University of Oxford
- Thesis: Skeuomorphs and stone-working : elaborate lithics from the early metal-using era in coastal, northwest Europe (2010)

Catherine J. Frieman is an archaeologist and associate professor at the Australian National University. Her research investigates conservatism and innovation, and she is a specialist in material culture and technology.

== Education ==
She graduated with a BA in archaeological studies from Yale. Frieman completed her MSt and DPhil at the University of Oxford. She held a Rhodes scholarship. Her 2010 dissertation, which examined lithic artifacts from northwest Europe that are typically referred to as skeuomorphs, examined the adoption of metallurgy and metal artifacts.

== Career ==
Frieman was appointed as a lecturer at ANU in after having held post-doctoral positions at Oxford, and lecturing at the University of Nottingham. She currently holds an ARC DECRA fellowship for the project Conservatism as a dynamic response to the diffusion of innovations. Frieman has co-edited volumes on flint daggers in prehistoric Europe and Bronze Age coastal archaeology finds in south-west Britain. She is co-editor of the European Journal of Archaeology. She has received teaching excellence awards from CASS, the Australian Office of Learning and Teaching and the ANU Vice-Chancellor's office, and has been appointed as an ANU Distinguished Educator.

Frieman is the co-director of the Southeast Kernow Archaeological Survey, which is investigating the Neolithic to later Iron Age period in Cornwall.

== Selected publications ==
- Frieman, C 2012. Going to pieces at the funeral: Completeness and complexity in early Bronze Age jet 'necklace' assemblages. Journal of Social Archaeology 12(3): 334–355.
- Frieman, C 2014. Double Edged blades : re-visiting the British (and Irish) flint daggers. Proceedings of the Prehistoric Society 80: 33–65.
- Frieman, C & Eriksen, B, eds, 2015. Flint Daggers in Prehistoric Europe. Oxford: Oxbow Books.
- Frieman, C, Bruck, J, Rebay-Salisbury, K et al. 2017. Aging Well: Treherne's 'Warrior's Beauty' Two Decades Later. European Journal of Archaeology 20(1): 36 – 73.
- Frieman, C, Piper, P, Nguyen, K et al. 2017. Rach Nui: Ground stone technology in coastal Neolithic settlements of southern Vietnam. Antiquity 91 (358): 933–946.
- Frieman, C & Janz, L 2018. A Very Remote Storage Box Indeed: The Importance of Doing Archaeology with Old Museum Collections. Journal of Field Archaeology 43(4): 257–268.
