= María Ángeles Querol =

Spanish historian, professor, and writer (born 1948)

- Born: María Ángeles Querol Fernández; 5 February 1948 (age 77); Badajoz, Spain
- Occupation: Academic
- Employer: Complutense University of Madrid
- Awards: European Archaeological Heritage Prize (2015)

María Ángeles Querol Fernández (born 5 February 1948) is a Spanish historian, professor, and writer.

== Career ==
María Ángeles Querol is a Professor of Prehistory at the Complutense University of Madrid.

Her research is based on three themes: human origins – with works such as Adán y Darwin – feminist archeology – with La mujer en el "Origen del Hombre", written with Consuelo Triviño – and archaeological heritage management – with the book La gestión del Patrimonio Arqueológico en España, written with Belén Martínez Díaz.

She is currently the director of Complutense Research Group 941794 (Archaeological Heritage), and is the principal investigator of the project The Archaeological Dimension in World Heritage Cities: Advances for Heritage Management in Alcalá de Henares, Puebla, and Havana (HAR2013-46735-R).

In 2015 she received the European Archaeological Heritage Prize for her contributions to the field, achievements in academic administration, and ethics.

== Positions held ==
- Deputy Director General of Archeology of the Ministry of Culture (1985–1988)
- President of the Professional Association of Archaeologists of Spain (1984–1990)
- President of the Andalusian Archeology Commission (1997–2000)
- Director of the Department of Prehistory (1994–2004)
- Coordinator of the Degree in Archeology at the Complutense University of Madrid (2010 to present)
- Coordinator of the Cultural Heritage Cluster of the Campus de Moncloa's Campus of International Excellence (2013 to present)
- Coordinator of the Interuniversity master's degree "Cultural Heritage in the 21st Century: Management and Research" of the Complutense University of Madrid and the Polytechnic University of Madrid (2017–2018)

== Selected publications ==
- Querol, María Ángeles and Santonja, Manuel 1979: "El yacimiento achelense de Pinedo (Toledo)", Excavaciones Arqueológicas en España, no. 106, XXI láms, Ministry of Culture, Madrid, Spain
- Querol, María Ángeles and Santonja, Manuel 1983: "El yacimiento de cantos trabajados de El Aculadero (Puerto de Santa Maria, Cádiz)". Excavaciones Arqueológicas en España, no. 130, VIII Lám, Ministry of Culture, Madrid, Spain
- Querol, María Ángeles 1991: De los primeros seres humanos, Ed. Síntesis, Prehistoria series, no. 2, Madrid, Spain
- Querol, María Ángeles and Martínez, Belén 1996, La gestión del Patrimonio Arqueológico en España. Alianza Universidad Textos, Madrid
- Querol, María Ángeles 2001, Adán y Darwin, Editorial Síntesis, Arqueología Prehistórica series no. 5. Madrid
- Querol, María Ángeles and Castillo, Alicia 2002: Entre Homínidos y elefantes. Un paseo por la remota edad de la piedra, Ediciones Doce Calles, Madrid, with illustrations by Gallego y Rey
- Querol, M. Ángeles y Triviño, Consuelo 2004: La mujer en "El Origen del Hombre", Ediciones Bellaterra, Arqueología series
- Querol, María Ángeles 2005: Un siglo de Extremadura en mi cocina, Publicaciones del Ayuntamiento de Badajoz
- Morant, Isabel (dir.) and Querol, María Ángeles; Martínez, Cándida, Pastor, Reyna, and Lavrin, A. (coords), 2005: Historia de las mujeres en España y América latina. Vol. 1: de la Prehistoria a la Edad Media, Cátedra
- Querol, María Ángeles and Ortega Mateos, L. (eds.) 2006: Moure Romanillo, Alfonso: Escritos sobre Historiografía y Patrimonio Arqueológico, University of Cantabria
- Querol, María Ángeles 2010: Manual de Gestión del Patrimonio Cultural, Akal, Madrid
- González Cambeiro, Sara and Querol, María Ángeles 2014: El Patrimonio Inmaterial, Editorial Libros La Catarata
