= Joanna Sofaer =

British archaeologist and professor

Joanna Sofaer FSA
- Education: University of Cambridge
- Occupations: Archaeologist, professor
- Employer: University of Southampton
- Known for: bioarchaoelogy and social identity in Central Europe and the Balkans
- Notable work: The Body as Material Culture (2006); Clay in the Age of Bronze: Essays in the archaeology of prehistoric creativity (2015)
- Awards: Fellow, Society of Antiquaries

Joanna Rachel Sofaer Derevenski FSA, known as Joanna Sofaer, is a British archaeologist and academic, who specialises in the European Bronze Age, using theoretical approaches, and material culture studies. She is Professor of Archaeology at the University of Southampton.

== Career ==
Sofaer received her Doctor of Philosophy (PhD) degree from the University of Cambridge in 1998, supervised by Marie Louise Stig Sørensen. Her doctoral thesis was titled "Gender archaeology as contextual archaeology: a critical examination of the tensions between method and theory in the archaeology of gender". She was a research fellow at Cambridge until 2000. She is a Professor of Archaeology at the University of Southampton and Director of Archaeology for the Creative Industries.

Sofaer's research combines bioarchaeology and social identity, with a particular focus on childhood. Her research focuses on Central Europe and the Balkans, and Sofaer co-directs research at the Bronze Age tell settlement at Százhalombatta, Hungary.

She is engaged in several multidisciplinary research projects, including Humanities in the European Research Area (HERA), in which she manages the "Creativity and Craft Production in Middle and Late Bronze Age Europe" project (2010–2013), and the EC-funded Marie-Curie ITN "Forging Identities" project.

She has published widely, including a 2006 monograph The Body as Material Culture, and the 2015 monograph Clay in the Age of Bronze. Essays in the archaeology of prehistoric creativity, which has been described as "rich and thought-provoking". Sofaer has edited the volumes Considering creativity: creativity, knowledge and practice in Bronze Age Europe (2018), Biographies and Space (2007), Material Identities (2007), and Children and Material Culture (2000).

Sofaer was elected as a Fellow of the Society of Antiquaries of London (FSA) in 2013. She was a Humanities in the European Research Area (HERA) Knowledge Exchange and Impact Fellow from 2017 to 2020. She is a member of the International Scientific Advisory Board of the Institute of Archaeology, Zagreb.

== Selected publications ==
- Sofaer, J., & Roberts, S. 2016. Technical innovation and practice in Eneolithic and Bronze Age encrusted ceramics in the Carpathian Basin, Middle and Lower Danube. Archaologische Korrespondenzblatt, 46(4), 479–496.
- Sofaer, J. 2012. Touching the body: the living and the dead in osteoarchaeology and the performance art of Marina Abramovic. Norwegian Archaeological Review, 45(2), 135–150. doi:10.1080/00293652.2012.703686
- Sofaer, J. 2011. Human ontogeny and material change at the bronze age tell of Százhalombatta, Hungary. Cambridge Archaeological Journal, 21(2), 217–227. doi:10.1017/S0959774311000242
- Sofaer, J. R. 2006. The Body as Material culture: a Theoretical Osteoarchaeology. (Topics in Contemporary Archaeology; Vol. 4). Cambridge, UK: Cambridge University Press. doi:10.1017/CBO9780511816666
- Sofaer-Derevenski, J. 2002. Engendering context. Context as gendered practice in the early Bronze Age of the Upper Thames Valley, UK. European Journal of Archaeology, 5(2), 191–211.
- Sofaer Derevenski, J. 1994. Where are the children? Accessing children of the past. Archaeological Review from Cambridge 13: 7–30.
