= Zena Kamash =

Archaeologist

Zena Kamash FSA
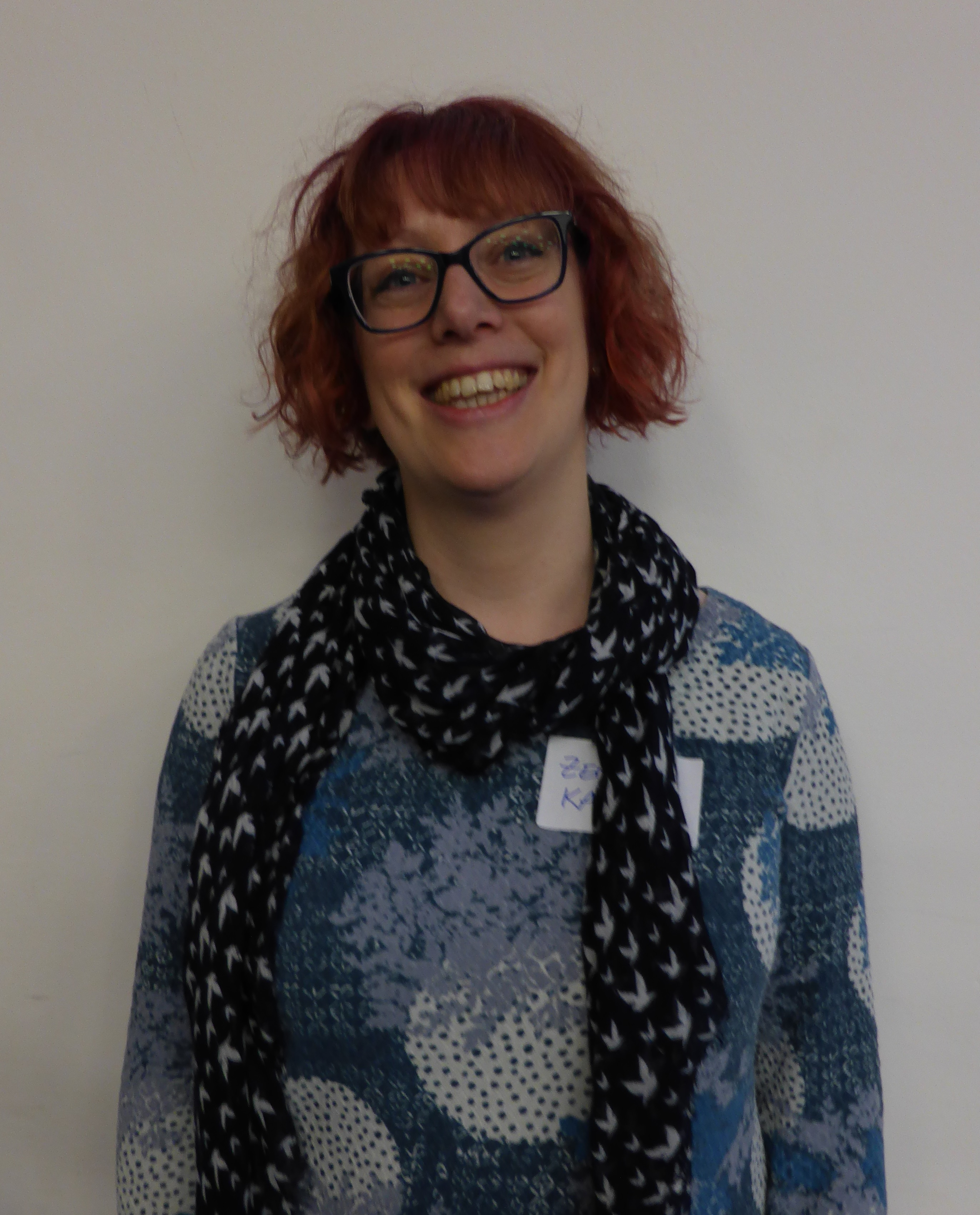

Academic background
- Education: University of Oxford
- Thesis: Water supply and management in the Near East, 63 BC-AD 636 (2007)
- Doctoral advisor: Andrew Wilson

Academic work
- Discipline: Archaeology
- Sub-discipline: Roman Archaeology
- Institutions: Royal Holloway, University of London

Zena Kamash FSA is a British Iraqi archaeologist and senior lecturer at Royal Holloway, University of London. Her research topics include water, food, memory, the Roman period in the Middle East and Britain.

== Education ==
Kamash studied for a Bachelor of Arts (BA) degree in classics at the University of Oxford. She completed a Doctor of Philosophy (DPhil) degree at Oxford in 2007: her doctoral thesis was entitled Water supply and management in the Near East, 63 BC-AD 636 and her supervisor was Andrew Wilson.

== Career ==
Kamash's early research focused on archaeological evidence for water management in the Roman Middle East, including dams, irrigation technology and toilets. From 2011 to 2014 she worked on the ERC funded English Landscapes and Identity Project, directed by Chris Gosden. She was the Director of Studies in Archaeology at Magdalen College, Oxford.

She was appointed as a lecturer in Roman Art and Archaeology at Royal Holloway. More recently, her research has focused on post conflict reconstruction in the Middle East, including an investigation into the public response to the reconstruction of Monumental Arch of Palmyra. The project "Rematerialising Mosul Museum" utilised crafting as a response to cultural heritage destruction in Iraq, collaborating with the artist Karin Celestine. Another research focus has been the role of food in the construction of memory and identity.

In 2019, Kamash was awarded a grant of £227,813.50 by the British Academy as Principal Investigator for a project entitled 'Crafting Heritage for Well-Being in Iraq'. Her co-investigators are Dr Emma Claire Palmer-Cooper of the University of Southampton and Dr Alana Marie Levinson-LaBrosse of the American University of Iraq. Kamash has also published on therapeutic uses of crafting in heritage and public engagement contexts, and the state of Roman archaeology as a discipline from the perspective of decolonisation and inclusivity.

== Honours and awards ==
Kamash was elected as a Fellow of the Society of Antiquaries in 2016. Kamash delivered the keynote address at the 2019 Theoretical Roman Archaeology Conference.

== Selected publications ==
=== Books ===
- Kamash, Z. 2010. Archaeologies of Water in the Roman Near East. Gorgias Press
- Kamash, Z, Gosden, C, Green, C, Cooper, A, Creswell, M, Donnelly, V, Franconi, T, Glyde, R, Mallet, S, Morley, L, Stansbie, D & ten Harkel, L. 2021, English Landscapes and Identities: Investigating Landscape Change from 1500 BC to AD 1086. Oxford University Press; Oxford.

=== Journal articles ===
- Kamash, Zena. 2021. "Rebalancing Roman Archaeology : From disciplinary inertia to decolonial and inclusive action", Theoretical Roman Archaeology Journal 4.1, pp. 1–41. doi:10.16995/traj.4330
- Baird, J and Z Kamash. 2019. 'Remembering Roman Syria: Valuing Tadmor‐Palmyra, from ‘Discovery’ to Destruction' Bulletin of the Institute of Classical Studies 62.1, p. 1-29
- Kamash, Z. 2018. 'Sweet and Delicious, he who Tastes it will Go Back to it’: Food, Memory and Religion in the Roman Middle East'. Theoretical Roman Archaeology Journal. 1. doi:10.16995/traj.146
- Kamash, Zena et al. 2017. Remembering the Romans in the Middle East and North Africa: memories and reflections from a museum-based public engagement project. Epoiesen: Journal for Creative Engagement in History and Archaeology.
- Kamash, Zena. 2017. 'Postcard to Palmyra’: bringing the public into debates over post-conflict reconstruction in the Middle East. World Archaeology 49, 5, p. 608-622
- Kamash, Zena. 2012. Irrigation technology, society and environment in the Roman Near East. Journal of Arid Environments. 86, p. 65-74
- Kamash, Z, C Gosden, and G Lock. 2010. “Continuity and Religious Practices in Roman Britain: The Case of the Rural Religious Complex at Marcham/Frilford, Oxfordshire.” Britannia 41: 95–125.
- Kamash, Zena. 2009. “What Lies beneath ? Perceptions of the Ontological Paradox of Water.” World Archaeology 40 (2): 224–37.
