= David Lowenthal =

American historian and geographer (1923–2018)

David Lowenthal FBA
- Born: 26 April 1923; New York City, US
- Died: 15 September 2018 (aged 95); London, England
- Years active: 1950–2018
- Known for: Heritage and spatial concepts of the past and future
- Spouses: Jane; Mary Alice Lamberty (m. 1970)
- Parents: Max Lowenthal; Eleanor Mack

Academic background
- Education: Harvard University; University of California, Berkeley; University of Wisconsin, Madison
- Thesis: George Perkins Marsh (1953)
- Doctoral advisor: Merle Curti
- Influences: George Perkins Marsh; Carl Sauer; John Kirtland Wright

Academic work
- Discipline: History; geography
- Sub-discipline: Caribbean studies; cultural geography; environmental history; heritage studies; historical geography
- Institutions: University College, London
- Notable works: The Past Is a Foreign Country (1985)
- Influenced: Denis Cosgrove; Stephen Daniels

David Lowenthal FBA (26 April 1923 – 15 September 2018) was an American historian and geographer, renowned for his work on heritage. He is credited with having made heritage studies a discipline in its own right.

== Biography ==
David Lowenthal was born on 26 April 1923 in New York City and was the brother of John Lowenthal and Betty Levin.

Lowenthal graduated from the Lincoln School in New York, which encouraged interdisciplinary investigation. He went to Harvard University during the Second World War, studying across several disciplines but graduating with a Bachelor of Science degree in history in 1944. He returned to study for a Master of Arts degree in geography at the University of California, Berkeley, in 1950. At Berkeley his research was on the Guianas, working with Carl Sauer. He earned his Doctor of Philosophy degree in history from the University of Wisconsin–Madison, for a study of the life of George Perkins Marsh, an early geographer and conservationist.

Lowenthal was inducted into the US Army infantry in May 1943 and deployed in September 1944, three months after D-Day. He left active service with trench foot, and it was while recuperating in Somerset that his long association with England, later to become his adopted country, began. In December 1944, he was reassigned to Army Intelligence and embarked on a mission to count toilets in German castles to ascertain how well each might support the occupation forces. While taking part in the Intelligence Photographic Documentation Project – a never-completed mission to survey and catalogue the whole of western Europe's terrain and built environment – Lowenthal fell from his truck and fractured his wrist, which resulted in his being recalled to Washington in September 1945.

== Career ==
Lowenthal served as a research analyst for the US Department of State from 1945 to 1946. From 1952 to 1956, he was an assistant professor of history at Vassar College. He then undertook several postings, between the US, Caribbean, and the UK. From 1956 to 1970 at the University of the West Indies in Jamaica, he was a history lecturer, research associate, and a consultant to the Vice Chancellor. From 1958 to 1972, he was also a research associate at the American Geographical Society. Between 1961 and 1972 he worked at the Institute of Race Relations in London. He was a professor of geography at University College London (UCL) 1972 to 1985 and remained an emeritus professor there until his death. In October 2017 he gave the inaugural lecture in an annual series for UCL's new Centre for Critical Heritage Studies.

Lowenthal died in London on 15 September 2018, having celebrated his 95th birthday with friends earlier in the year, in both London and San Francisco.

He and his family lived in Harrow on the Hill in north-west London for many years, and after retirement, in California.

== Contributions ==
Lowenthal's doctoral work was on the 19th-century North American philologist, geographer, and environmentalist George Perkins Marsh, whose work laid the foundations of the environmental conservation movement in the United States, and led to his book George Perkins Marsh: Versatile Vermonter (1958, revised 2003).

Other key texts of his in the field of historical geography include The Heritage Crusade and the Spoils of History (1996), and Passage du Temps sur le Paysage (2008). Landscape photographs taken by Lowenthal in the 1950s were included in a French exhibition at Le Pavillon Populaire in Montpellier, France, from 8 February to 16 April 2017 and accompanying book Notes sur l'asphalte, une Amérique mobile et précaire, 1950-1990. His last book, Quest for the Unity of Knowledge, was published posthumously in November 2018.

He was well known for his work on landscapes, and advised international heritage agencies and institutions, including UNESCO, the International Council on Monuments and Sites, the International Council of Museums, ICCROM, the Getty Conservation Institute, the World Monuments Fund, the Council of Europe, Europa Nostra, English Heritage, the US National Trust for Historic Preservation, the National Trust of Australia, and the Norwegian Directorate for Cultural Heritage.

His historical analysis of the ever-changing role of the past in shaping human lives, The Past Is a Foreign Country (1985), is his best-known work, widely considered to be a classic text. A new book, The Past Is a Foreign Country – Revisited, came out in 2015, for which he was honoured with a British Academy Medal in the same year.

Lowenthal was also active in the Sark community, first visiting the island in the 1990s. He returned several times since 2010 while becoming involved in the Sark community's battle against constitutional reform preferential to the Barclay twins.

== Recognition ==
Lowenthal was awarded several medals by institutions around the world. These included:

- The Victoria Medal of the Royal Geographical Society, awarded in 1997 "for conspicuous merit in research in geography".
- The Cullum Geographical Medal of the American Geographical Society, awarded in 1999 for "geographical discoveries, or in the advancement of geographical science".
- The Scottish Geographical Medal of the Royal Scottish Geographical Society, awarded in 2004 for "conspicuous merit and a performance of world-wide repute".
- In 2016 (at the age of 93) he received the British Academy Medal for The Past Is a Foreign Country—Revisited (Cambridge University Press, 2015). The medal honors "a landmark academic achievement which has transformed understanding in the humanities and social sciences" in a book that explores "the manifold ways in which history engages, illuminates and deceives us in the here and now".
- Guggenheim Fellowship (1965).
- Fellow of the British Academy (2001),
- Honorary Doctorate, Memorial University of Newfoundland (2008)
- Forbes Lecture Prize from the International Institute for Conservation (2010).
- University of Mary Washington Center for Historic Preservation 1989 Book Prize for The Past Is a Foreign Country.

== Selected bibliography ==
- West Indian Societies (1972)
- The Past Is a Foreign Country (1985)
- The Heritage Crusade and the Spoils of History (1996)
- No Liberty for License (1997)
- Shakespeare and the Good Life (1997)
- The Past Is a Foreign Country – Revisited (2015)
- Shakespeare's Thought (2017)
- Quest for the Unity of Knowledge (2018)

Awards
Preceded by Ronald F. Abler	Victoria Medal; 1997	Succeeded by Ian Simmons
Preceded by Melvin G. Marcus	Cullum Geographical Medal; 1999; With: Jack Dangermond	Succeeded by Wilbur Zelinsky
Preceded by Robert Dodgshon	Scottish Geographical Medal; 2004	Succeeded by Vanessa Lawrence
Preceded by Patricia Clavin	British Academy Medal; 2016; With: T. C. W. Blanning and Susan E. Kelly	Succeeded by Antony Griffiths
Preceded by R. F. Foster	British Academy Medal; 2016; With: T. C. W. Blanning and Susan E. Kelly	Succeeded by Avi Shlaim
Preceded by Robert Fowler	British Academy Medal; 2016; With: T. C. W. Blanning and Susan E. Kelly	Succeeded by Dame Marina Warner
