= Geoffrey Parker (historian) =

English historian (born 1943)

Geoffrey Parker FRHistS FBA
- Born: Noel Geoffrey Parker; 25 December 1943 (age 82); Nottingham, England
- Awards: Heineken Prize (2012)

Academic background
- Education: Christ's College, Cambridge
- Doctoral advisor: Sir John Elliott

Academic work
- Discipline: History
- Sub-discipline: Early-modern European history; military history
- Institutions: Christ's College, Cambridge; University of St Andrews; University of Illinois Urbana-Champaign; Yale University; Ohio State University
- Doctoral students: Tonio Andrade; Derek Croxton; Francis X. Rocca
- Main interests: Military Revolution
- Notable works: The Military Revolution (1988); Global Crisis (2013)

Noel Geoffrey Parker (born 25 December 1943) is an English historian specialising in the history of Western Europe, Spain, and warfare during the early modern era. His best-known book is The Military Revolution: Military Innovation and the Rise of the West, 1500–1800, first published by Cambridge University Press in 1988.

He holds his BA, MA, PhD, and LittD degrees from Cambridge University where he studied under the historian Sir John Elliott.

Parker has taught at the University of Illinois, the University of St Andrews, and Yale University. He is currently the Andreas Dorpalen Professor of History at the Ohio State University.

Parker was a consultant and main contributor on the BBC series, Armada: 12 Days to Save England.

In 2023, he was elected to the American Philosophical Society.

== Western way of warfare ==
Parker argues that what distinguishes the "Western way of war" accounts for its extraordinary success in conquering most of the world after 1500:

The Western way of war rests upon five principal foundations: technology, discipline, a highly aggressive military tradition, a remarkable capacity to innovate and to respond rapidly to the innovation of others and—from about 1500 onward—a unique system of war finance. The combination of all five provided a formula for military success.... The outcome of wars has been determined less by technology than by better war plans, the achievement of surprise, greater economic strength, and above all superior discipline.

Parker argues that Western armies were stronger because they emphasized discipline, that is, "the ability of a formation to stand fast in the face of the enemy, where they're attacking or being attacked, without giving way to the natural impulse of fear and panic." Discipline came from drills and marching in formation, target practice, and creating small "artificial kinship groups" such as the company and the platoon, to enhance psychological cohesion and combat efficiency.

== Honours ==
According to Tonio Andrade and William Reger:

Few people of his generation have had such an important influence on our understanding of the early modern world. He’s written on military history, financial history, the history of crime, Spanish history, Dutch history, religious history, global history, and most recently, environmental history. His work is known throughout the world—he's been translated into more than a dozen languages—and he’s particularly revered in Spain and the Netherlands. He has trained and mentored several generations of scholars by instilling in them his characteristic and successful recipe for historical research: focusing on big questions but keep your feet on the ground, or, as he might put it, your ass in the archives.

Parker is a Fellow of the British Academy (FBA). He is a Corresponding Fellow of the Royal Society of Edinburgh (FRSE).

He was awarded the Joseph Sullivant Medal by OSU in 2021. In 2014, Parker was awarded the British Academy Medal for his book Global Crisis: War, Climate Change and Catastrophe in the Seventeenth Century.

Amongst the foreign honours he holds, he is a member of the Order of Alfonso X the Wise and was granted the Great Cross of the Order of Isabella the Catholic by the Spanish government. He has received honorary doctorates from the Catholic University of Brussels (Belgium) and the University of Burgos (Spain). He is also a corresponding member of the Spanish Real Academia de la Historia (since 1987), and member of the Royal Netherlands Academy of Arts and Sciences since 2005. In 2012 he was awarded the Dr. A. H. Heineken Prize for History by the Royal Netherlands Academy of Arts and Sciences for his outstanding scholarship on the social, political and military history of Europe between 1500 and 1650, in particular Spain, Philip II, and the Dutch Revolt; for his contribution to military history in general; and for his research on the role of climate in world history.

In 1999, he was awarded the Samuel Eliot Morison Prize for lifetime achievement given by the Society for Military History.

== Major works ==
- Guide to the Archives of the Spanish Institutions in or concerned with the Netherlands (1556–1706). Brussels, 1971. (Archives et Bibliothèques de Belgique, numéro spécial 3).
- The Army of Flanders and the Spanish Road, 1567–1659: The Logistics of Spanish Victory and Defeat in the Low Countries' Wars. Cambridge University Press, 1972 (2nd ed. 2004).
- "Military Revolution, 1560–1660: A Myth?" The Journal of Modern History 48, no. 2 (June 1976): 195–214.
- The Dutch Revolt. London: Allen Lane, 1977 (revised edition, 1985).
- (with Angela Parker) European Soldiers, 1550–1650. Cambridge University Press, 1977.
- (edited with Charles Wilson) An Introduction to the Sources of European Economic History, 1500–1800 (Cornell University Press, 1977).
- Philip II. Boston: Little, Brown, 1978 (3rd ed. Chicago: Open Court, 1995).
- (Joint editor) The General Crisis of the Seventeenth Century. London: Routledge, 1978 (2nd ed. 1997).
- Europe in Crisis, 1598–1648. Cornell University Press, 1979 (2nd ed. 2001).
- Spain and the Netherlands 1559-1659: Ten Studies. London: Collins, 1979 (2nd ed. Fontana, 1990).
- The Thirty Years' War (with several contributors). London: Routledge and Kegan Paul, 1984 (rev. eds. 1987, 1993, 1997).
- Western Geopolitical Thought in the Twentieth Century. London: Croom Helm, 1985.
- (With Colin Martin) The Spanish Armada. New York: W. W. Norton, 1988 (rev. ed. 1999).
- "Why the Armada Failed." The Quarterly Journal of Military History 1, no. 1 (Autumn 1988).
- (Joint editor) The Times History of the World, 3rd ed. London, 1995.
- The Cambridge Illustrated History of Warfare: The Triumph of the West. Cambridge University Press, 1995 (rev. ed. 2008, 2nd ed. 2021).
- The Military Revolution: Military Innovation and the Rise of the West, 1500–1800. Cambridge University Press, 1988 (rev. ed. 1996).
- (co-edited with Robert Cowley) The Reader's Companion to Military History. Boston: Houghton Mifflin, 1996.
- The Grand Strategy of Philip II. New Haven: Yale University Press, 1998.
- The World is Not Enough: The Imperial Vision of Philip II of Spain. Waco, Texas: Markham Press Fund, 2001.
- Empire, War and Faith in Early Modern Europe. London: Allen Lane, 2002.
- (Editor) The Cambridge History of Warfare. New York, Cambridge University Press, 2005 (rev. ed. 2020)
- Felipe II: La biografía definitiva. Barcelona: Editorial Planeta, 2010.
- Global Crisis: War, Climate Change and Catastrophe in the Seventeenth Century. New Haven and London: Yale University Press, 2013.
- Imprudent King: A New Life of Philip II. New Haven and London: Yale University Press, 2014.
- Emperor: A New Life of Charles V. New Haven and London: Yale University Press, 2019. ISBN 9780300196528 OCLC 1112998062
- (With Colin Martin) Armada: The Spanish Enterprise and England's Deliverance in 1588. Yale University Press, 2022.

== See also ==
- Military Revolution

Awards
| Preceded by Stephen E. Ambrose | Samuel Eliot Morison Prize; 1999 | Succeeded by David Glantz |
| Preceded by Rosamond McKitterick | Heineken Prize for History; 2012 | Succeeded by Aleida Assmann |
| Preceded by David Abulafia | British Academy Medal; 2014; With: David Luscombe and Thomas Piketty | Succeeded by Patricia Clavin |
| Preceded by Richard P. Cooper | British Academy Medal; 2014; With: David Luscombe and Thomas Piketty | Succeeded by R. F. Foster |
| Preceded by Noel Malcolm | British Academy Medal; 2014; With: David Luscombe and Thomas Piketty | Succeeded by Robert Fowler |
| Preceded by Timothy Shallice | British Academy Medal; 2014; With: David Luscombe and Thomas Piketty | Succeeded by Robert Fowler |
