= Tischer =

Tischer is a German surname. Notable people with the surname include:

- Anuschka Tischer (born 1968), Robert Bosch Foundation Lecturer for History at the University of Riga
- Janine Tischer (born 1984), German bobsledder
- Mae Tischer (1928-2018), American politician
- Simon Tischer (born 1982), German volleyball player

== See also ==
- Tischner
