= British Academy Medal =

The British Academy Medal is awarded annually by the British Academy to up to three individuals or groups. It is awarded for "outstanding achievement that has transformed understanding of a particular subject or field of study in ... any branch of the humanities and social sciences". It was first awarded in 2013. It is the first medal awarded by the British Academy for any subject within the remit of the academy. According to a reputation survey conducted in 2018, it is the third most prestigious interdisciplinary award in the social sciences, after the Holberg Prize and the Stein Rokkan Prize for Comparative Social Science Research. The British Academy medal is no longer being awarded since 2019.

== List of recipients ==
=== 2013 ===
Three people were awarded the British Academy Medal in 2013.

- David Abulafia FBA, for The Great Sea (2011)
- Dr Noel Malcolm FBA, for Thomas Hobbes: Leviathan (2012)
- Timothy Shallice FBA, and Dr Richard Cooper, for The Organisation of Mind (2011)

=== 2014 ===
Three people were awarded the British Academy Medal in 2014.

- Professor David Luscombe FBA, for The Letter Collection of Peter Abelard and Heloise (Oxford University Press, 2013)
- Professor Geoffrey Parker FBA, for Global Crisis: War, Climate Change and Catastrophe in the Seventeenth Century (Yale University Press, 2013)
- Professor Thomas Piketty, for Capital in the 21st Century

=== 2015 ===
Three people were awarded the British Academy Medal in 2015.

- Professor Patricia Clavin, for Securing The World Economy: The Reinvention of the League of Nations 1920-1946 (Oxford University Press, 2013)
- Professor R. F. Foster FBA, for Vivid Faces: The Revolutionary Generation in Ireland 1890-1923 (Allen Lane, 2014)
- Professor Robert Fowler FBA, for Early Greek Mythography Volume 2: Commentary (Oxford University Press, 2013)

=== 2016 ===
Three people were awarded the British Academy Medal in 2016.

- Professor Tim Blanning FBA, for Frederick the Great: King of Prussia (Allen Lane, 2015)
- Dr Susan E. Kelly, for Charters of Chertsey Abbey (British Academy, 2015) and Charters of Christ Church Canterbury (British Academy, 2013)
- Professor David Lowenthal FBA, for The Past is a Foreign Country – Revisited (Cambridge University Press, 2015)

=== 2017 ===
On 27 September 2017, three individuals were awarded the British Academy Medal:

- Professor Antony Griffiths FBA, for The Print Before Photography: An Introduction to European Printmaking 1550-1820 (2016)
- Professor Avi Shlaim FBA, for lifetime achievement
- Professor Dame Marina Warner DBE CBE FBA, for lifetime achievement

=== 2018 ===
On 20 August 2018, three individuals were awarded the British Academy Medal:

- Dr Miriam Griffin, for lifetime achievement
- Dr Timothy Bruce Mitford, FSA, for East of Asia Minor: Rome’s Hidden Frontier, Vols I & II (Oxford University Press, 2018)
- Professor Catherine Whistler, for Venice and Drawing, 1500–1800: Theory, Practice and Collection (Yale University Press, 2016)

=== 2019 ===
In 2019, one individual was awarded the British Academy Medal:

- Professor Naomi Oreskes, for Merchants of Doubt (Bloomsbury Press, 2010) and The Collapse of Western Civilization (Columbia University Press, 2014), and for her commitment to documenting the role of corporations in distorting scientific findings for political ends

== See also ==
- Awards of the British Academy
- List of general awards in the humanities
- List of social sciences awards
