= Royal studies =

Academic research of nobility, monarchies, royal families, and aristocracies

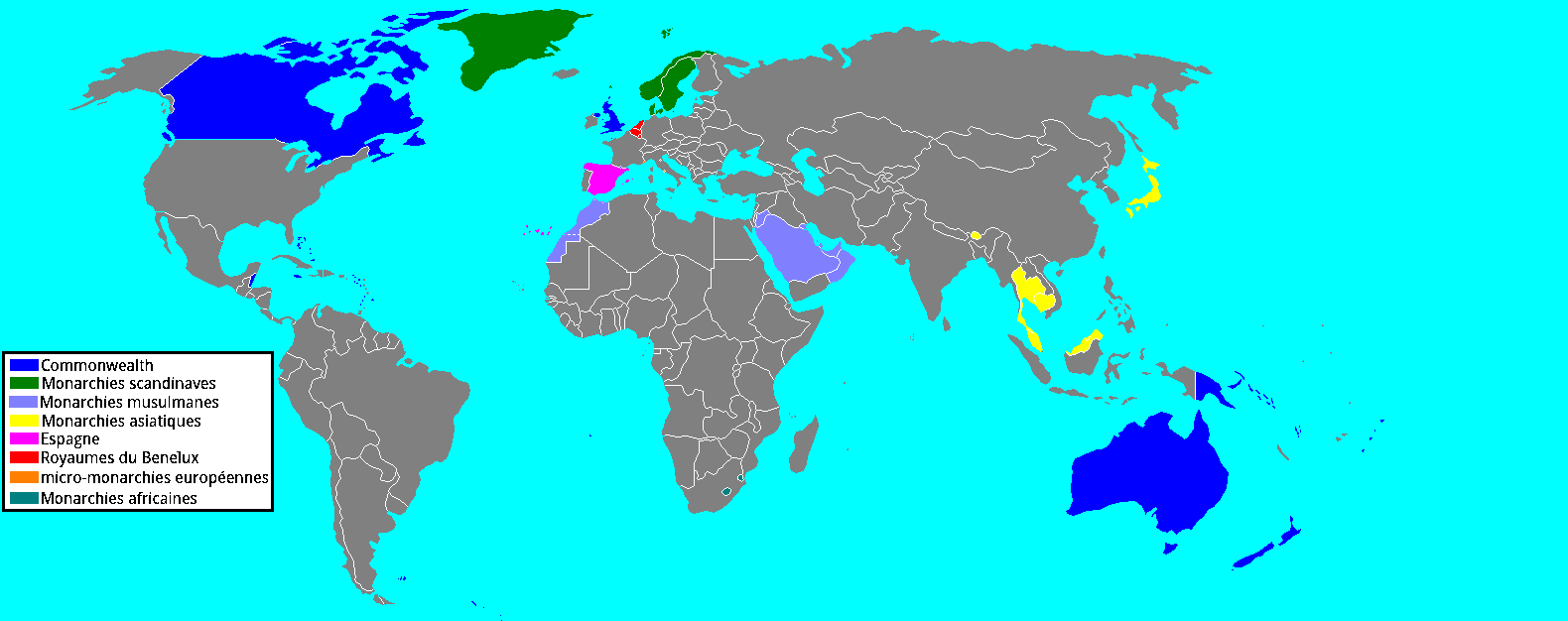
Map of the list of monarchies around the world.

Royal studies is the academic research of the institution of monarchy across time and place including dynasties or royal families, relations with the nobility, aristocracies and commoners, royal courts, the relationship between monarchy and religion and the theory and practice of rulership.

== History ==
In 2012 the Royal Studies Network was founded at the and started publishing the Royal Studies Journal with Winchester University Press (in connection with the University of Winchester) in 2014. It is also connected with the Kings & Queens conference series, which has been held at academic institutions across Europe, the UK and North and South America. The journal provides an Open Access publication for the forum for the field including research articles, special issues, cluster features and book reviews of the latest publications in royal studies. In 2016 the Royal Studies Journal Early Career and Young Researcher's Article Prize and a Book Prize were both inaugurated.

== Disciplines ==
The area includes research across several academic disciplines in fields including:

- Genealogy
- Heritage studies
- Historiography
- Diplomacy
- Royal household
- International relations
- Biographical studies
