= Anthony Griffith =

Anthony Griffith may refer to

- Anthony Griffith (actor), American actor and comedian
- Anthony Griffith (footballer), English-born footballer for Montserrat

== See also ==
- Antony Griffiths, English art historian and curator of prints
