= The Great Sea: A Human History of the Mediterranean =

2011 book by David Abulafia

- Author: David Abulafia
- Language: English
- Published: 2011 by Allen Lane
- Publication place: United Kingdom
- Pages: 816 pp (first edition)
- ISBN: 978-0-713-99934-1
- OCLC: 689522197

The Great Sea: A Human History of the Mediterranean is a book by the British historian David Abulafia. First published in 2011, it is a history of the Mediterranean Sea from 22,000 BC to the present time, and provides one of the most comprehensive treatments of the subject since the works of Fernand Braudel.

The book has been critically acclaimed and received the Mountbatten Literary Award from the Maritime Foundation, and the British Academy Medal. It has so far been translated into Dutch, Greek, Turkish, Spanish, Arabic, Korean, German, Italian, Romanian and Portuguese.
