= Archaeological Review from Cambridge =

Academic journal

- Discipline: Archaeology
- Language: English
- Edited by: Vaneshree Vidyarthi

Publication details
- History: 1981–present
- Publisher: Archaeological Review from Cambridge (United Kingdom)
- Frequency: Biannual

Standard abbreviations
- ISO 4: Archaeol. Rev. Camb.

Indexing
- ISSN: 0261-4332
- OCLC no.: 612660375

Links
- Journal homepage; Online table of contents

The Archaeological Review from Cambridge (ARC) is a biannual academic journal of archaeology. It is managed and published on a non-profit, voluntary basis by postgraduate researchers in the Department of Archaeology at the University of Cambridge. Each issue addresses a particular subject of interest within archaeology, featuring topics such as ethnoarchaeology, feminist archaeology and landscape archaeology.

The first issue of ARC was published in 1981. Following a brief hiatus, the journal returned to regular production in the spring of 1983, and has since been continually published twice a year. The journal's current general editor is Vaneshree Vidyarthi.

== Aims and Intentions ==
ARC aims to provide a platform for the discussion of current archaeological research, welcoming relevant contributions from archaeologists of any temporal, geographic or theoretical standpoint. A statement of editorial intent was outlined in Volume 2.1 (Spring 1983), expressing that ARC was established in order to bridge the gap between the formal publication of major research projects in leading journals, and the more informal discussions which take place at seminars and conferences.

Issues typically consist of a thematic section (containing articles relating to the issue's overarching theme), a general section (intended to provide a forum within which subjects, not connected with the thematic section but of current interest, may be presented) and commentary (covering shorter notes and contributions, reviews and correspondence arising from the study and practice of archaeology more widely). Book and article reviews are also a regular feature of each journal.

== Table of Issues ==
Number	Title	Theme Editor(s)	Date
41.1	The Archaeology of Skin	Madison Bennett	May 2026
40.2	Shall We Still Write? Text and Knowledge in Production in Decolonial Archaeology	Charlotte Wood & Lucy Emanuel	Nov 2025
40.1	Food, Gods & Ancestors: Global Perspectives on the Archaeology of Ritual Food Practices	Megan Rose Hinks & Ella McCafferty Wright	May 2025
39.2	Indigenous Archaeologies	Natasha Rai	November 2024
39.1	Human Insect Entanglement: Past, Present, and Future	Nynke Blömer, Benny Shen and Jake Stone	June 2024
38.2	Archaeology and the Publics	Christos Nikolaou, Stanley Onyemechalu, Chike Pilgrim, and Benny Shen	November 2023
38.1	Archaeology and Colonialism	Marianna Negro, Julia Gustafson and Gian Battista Marras	May 2023
37.2	Aesthetics, Sensory Skills and Archaeology	Polina Kapsali and Rachel Phillips	November 2022
37.1	Rethinking the Archaeology-Heritage Divide	Alisa Santikarn, Elifgül Doǧan, Oliver Antczak, Kim Eileen Ruf and Mariana P.L. Pereira	May 2022
36.2	Text & Image	Elisa Scholz and Glynnis Maynard	November 2021
36.1	Resilience & Archaeology	Sergio G. Russo and Leah M. Brainerd	May 2021
35.2	Knowledge-scapes	Julia Montes-Landa, Friederike Jürcke and Alessandro Ceccarelli	November 2020
35.1	The Chaîne Opératoire: Past, Present, and Future	Michael Lewis and Monique Arntz	September 2020
34.2	Beyond the Human: Applying Posthumanist Thinking to Archaeology	Mark Haughton and David K. Kay	December 2019
34.1	Desert Archaeology	Camila Alday and Sarah Morrisset	April 2019
33.2	The Others: Deviants, Outcasts and Outsiders in Archaeology	Leah Damman and Sam Leggett	November 2018
33.1	Glocal Archaeology	Lindsey J. Fine and Jess E. Thompson	April 2018
32.2	On the Edge of the Anthropocene? Modern Climate Change and the Practice of Archaeology	J. Eva Meharry, Rebecca Haboucha and Margaret Comer	November 2017
32.1	In Sickness and In Health	Eóin W. Parkinson and Lynette Talbot	July 2017
31.2	Landscapes	Ian Ostericher	November 2016
31.1	In the Trenches	Meghan E. Strong	April 2016
30.2	Archaeology: Myths Within and Without	Benjamin Hinson and Barbora Janulíková	November 2015
30.1	Seen and Unseen Spaces	Matthew Dalton, Georgie Peters and Ana Tavares	April 2015
29.2	The Archive Issue	Renate Fellinger and Leanne Philpot	November 2014
29.1	Social Network Perspectives in Archaeology	Sarah Evans and Kathrin Felder	April 2014
28.2	Humans and Animals	Kate Boulden and Sarah Musselwhite	November 2013
28.1	Archaeology and Cultural Mixture	W. Paul van Pelt	April 2013
27.2	Archaeology and the (De)Construction of National and Supra-National Polities	Russell Ó Ríagáin and Cătălin Nicolae Popa	November 2012
27.1	Science and the Material Record	Katie Hall and Danika Parikh	April 2012
26.2	Collaborative Archaeology	Dominic Walker	November 2011
26.1	Archaeology and Economic Crises	Rosalind Wallduck and Suzanne E. Pilaar Birch	April 2011
25.2	Boundaries and Archaeology	Mark Sapwell and Victoria Pia Spry-Marqués	November 2010
25.1	Violence and Conflict in the Material Record	Skylar Neil and Belinda Crerar	April 2010
24.2	Beyond Determinism? Engagement and Response in Human Environment Interactions	Robyn H. Inglis and Alexander J.E. Pryor	November 2009
24.1	Invention and Reinvention: Perceptions and Archaeological Practice	Tera C. Pruitt and Donna Yates	April 2009
23.2	Movement, Mobility and Migration	Emma Lightfoot	November 2008
23.1	Archaeological Histories: 25th Anniversary Edition	Monique Boddington and Naomi Farrington	April 2008
22.2	The Disturbing Past	James Holloway and Alison Klevnas	November 2007
22.1	The Materiality of Burial Practices	Alice Stevenson and Natalie C.C. White	April 2007
21.2	Embodied Identities	Isabelle Vella Gregory	November 2006
21.1	Technologies: Changing Matter; Changing Minds?	Brad Gravina	April 2006
20.2	Issues of Food and Drink: An Interdisciplinary Approach	Sarah Ralph	November 2005
20.1	Active Landscapes: Paleolithic to Present	Mary Chester-Kadwell	April 2005
19.2	Reconsidering Ethnicity: Material Culture and Identity in the Past	Susanne E. Hakenbeck and Steven G. Matthews	November 2004
19.1	Art and Archaeology: Unmasking Material Culture	David A. Barrowclough	April 2004
18	Medieval Animals	Aleks Pluskowski	June 2002
17.2	Early Medieval Religion	Aleks Pluskowski	2001
17.1	New Approaches to the Palaeolithic and Mesolithic	Chantal Conneller	April 2000
16.1 & 16.2	Contending with Bones	Nicky Milner, Dorian Q Fuller and Mary Baxter	November 2003
15.2	Disability and Archaeology	Nyree Finlay	1999
15.1	The Archaeology of Perception and the Senses	Carleton Jones and Chris Hayden	1998
14.2	An Archaeological Assortment	Nicky Milner and Dorian Q Fuller	1997 (for 1995)
14.1	History and Archaeology	Mads Ravn and Rupert Britton	1997 (for 1995)
13.2	Perspectives on Children and Childhood	Jo Sofaer Derevenski	Winter 1994
13.1	Archaeology Out of Africa	Rachel MacLean and Timothy Insoll	Spring 1994
12.2	The Hierarchy of Being Human	Mark Lake and Paul Pettitt	Autumn 1993
12.1	General Perspectives		Spring 1993
11.2	Digging for a Laugh	Bill Sillar	Autumn 1992
11.1	In the Midst of Life	Sarah Tarlow and Brian Boyd	Summer 1992
10.2	Archaeology in Context	Jonathan Last	Winter 1991
10.1	Interpreting Archaeological Science	Kathryn Roberts and Kevin C. MacDonald	Spring 1991
9.2	Affective Archaeology	John Carman and Jeremy Meredith	Winter 1990
9.1	Technology in the Humanities	Anthony Sinclair and Nathan Schlanger	Summer 1990
8.2	Writing Archaeology	Anthony Sinclair	Winter 1989
8.1	Dangerous Liaisons? Archaeology in East and West	Simon Kaner and Sarah Taylor	Spring 1989
7.2	Archaeology and the Heritage Industry	Frederick Baker	Autumn 1998
7.1	Women in Archaeology	Karen Arnold, Roberta Gilchrist, Pam Graves and Sarah Taylor	Spring 1988
6.2	Archaeology as Education	Nigel Holman and Fiona Burtt	Autumn 1987
6.1	Time and Archaeology	Patricia Curry and Olivier de Montmollin	Spring 1987
5.2	Creating Space	Robin Boast and Eugenia Yiannouli	Autumn 1986
5.1	Archaeology and Politics	Ajay Pratap and Nandini Rao	Spring 1986
4.2	Aesthetics and Style	James Whitley	Autumn 1985
4.1	Surface Archaeology	Paul Lane	Spring 1985
3.2	Archaeology and Texts	John Bennet	Autumn 1984
3.1	The History of Archaeology	James B. McVicar	Spring 1984
2.2	Ethnoarchaeology	Todd Whitelaw	Spring 1983
2.1	Archaeology and the Public	Robert Bewley	Spring 1983
1.2	General Issue	Sheena Crawford and Henrietta L. Moore	Summer 1981
1.1	Founding Issue	Sheena Crawford and Henrietta L. Moore	Summer 1981

== Notable Contributors ==
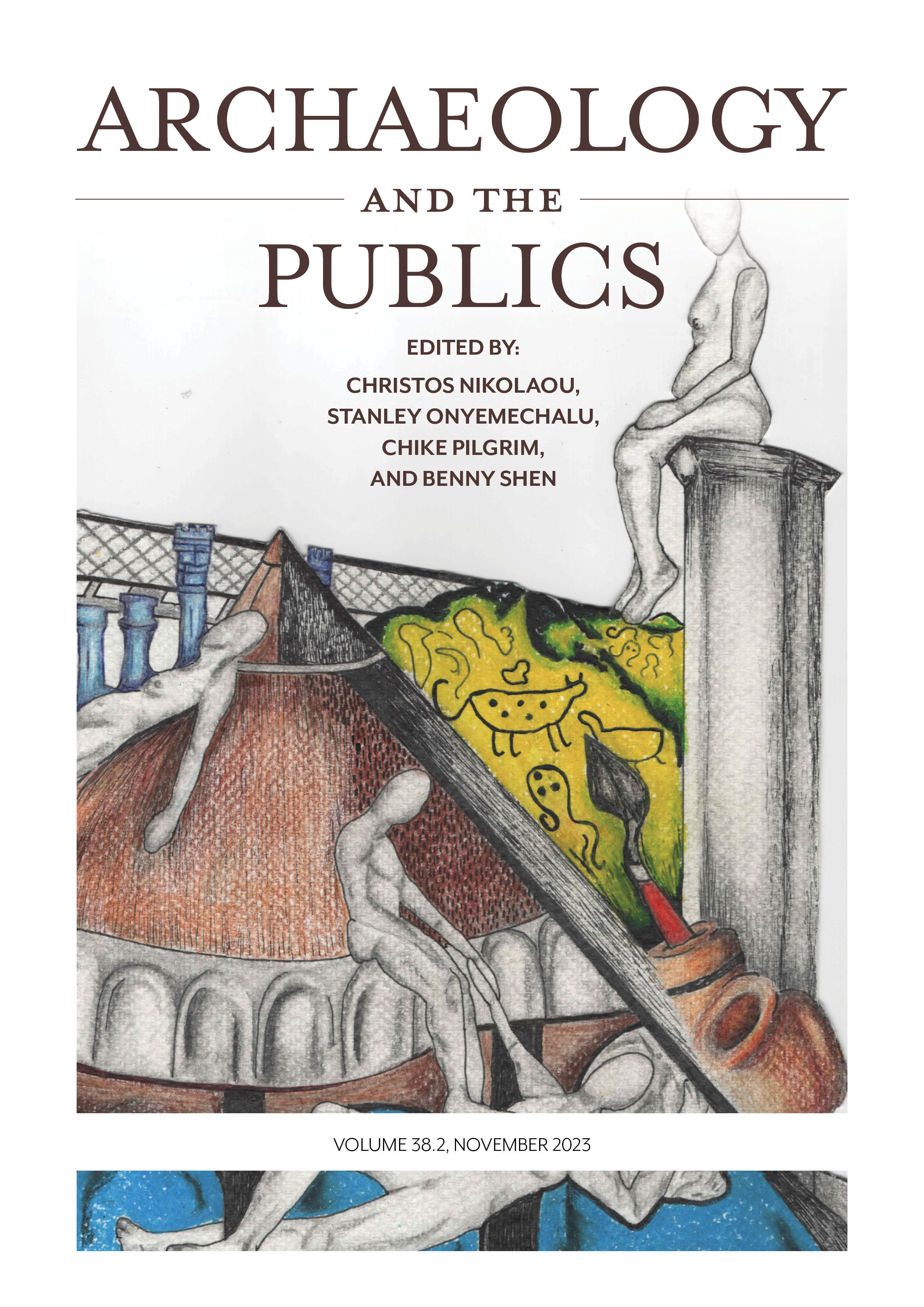
Front cover image of ARC issue 38.2: Archaeology and the Publics

A number of notable archaeologists have contributed to the journal since its founding, including: Graeme Barker, Dilip Kumar Chakrabarti, Christopher Chippindale, Ian Hodder, Lynn Meskell, Colin Renfrew, Chris Scarre, Charles Thurstan Shaw, Laurajane Smith, Peter Stone, Christopher Tilley, and John Bennet, amongst others.
