= Barry M. Gough =

Canadian marine historian (born 1938)

Barry Morton Gough
- Born: 17 September 1938 (age 88)
- Occupations: Maritime and naval historian

Barry Morton Gough is a Canadian global maritime and naval historian, professor, and author.

== Education ==
Gough attended Victoria High School and graduated from Victoria College in 1957, the predecessor of the University of Victoria. He completed his bachelor's degree at the University of British Columbia and master's degree at the University of Montana. He later earned his PhD at King's College London. In 1971, his doctoral research on sea power and geopolitics across the Pacific Rim became the inaugural publication of the University of British Columbia Press: The Royal Navy and the Northwest Coast of North America, 1810–1914: A Study of British Maritime Ascendancy. An expanded edition was subsequently published by Heritage House under the title Britannia's Navy on the West Coast of North America, 1812–1914.

Gough received an honorary Doctorate of Letters from the University of London in 1991 for his contribution to Imperial and Commonwealth history. In June 2021, the University of Victoria conferred upon him an Honorary Doctor of Laws.

== Teaching and consulting ==
Gough returned to Victoria High School as teaching staff, before becoming a Lecturer at Western Washington University in Bellingham, Washington, and co-director of the Center for Pacific Northwest Studies. He worked in the Department of History at Wilfrid Laurier University, in Waterloo, Ontario, from 1972 to 2004. Gough was appointed Associate Professor before being promoted to Professor, later earning the title University Research Professor. He was the founding coordinator of Canadian Studies at Laurier and served as coordinator of Interdisciplinary Studies and Assistant Dean of Arts. The material in a series of public lectures he organized was published with his introduction as In Search of the Visible Past.

In 1985, Gough was asked to prepare a historical legal claims dossier for the Tribal Council of the Nuu-Chah-Nulth in the Meares Island case (Moses Martin et al. v H.M. the Queen). In 2005, he was asked to prepare materials on the Alaska inland waters case, Alaska v the United States of America (2005), on behalf of the U.S. Department of Justice.

Gough's Great Lakes shipwreck research led to involvement with HMCS Haida as the ship's official historian. Gough was advisory editor to Macmillan Publishing for World Explorers and Discoverers (1992) and was editor-in-chief of the magazine American Neptune based at the Peabody Essex Museum in Massachusetts (1997–2003).

At his retirement from Wilfrid Laurier University after 33 years, Gough was appointed Professor Emeritus.

== Affiliations and affinities ==
Gough was a former president of the British Columbia Historical Federation and was later named BCHF honorary president. He worked with the Vancouver Maritime Museum as curator for the Vancouver 125 exhibition, "Captain George Vancouver" (2011), and was an advisor to the Maritime Museum of BC, Victoria. Continuing as a historical consultant to CFB Naval and Military Museum, Esquimalt, B.C., in 2017, he was curator of the Canada 150 Public History Project, "The Royal Canadian Navy and the Pacific Gateway to Wider Seas." A corresponding video production was released the following year as Our Seas Our Coasts Our Navy.

== Awards and medals ==
Barry Gough and his writings have received honours, awards, and prizes in the United States, the U.K., Spain, and Canada.

The British Maritime Foundation announced in November 2015 that Pax Britannica: Ruling the Waves and Keeping the Peace before Armageddon won the Mountbatten Literary Award 2015 for best literary contribution to the understanding of the importance of the seas. He received the Robert Gray Medal from The Washington State Historical Society for lifetime achievement in September 2016. The Naval Association of Canada presented him with the 2019 Admirals' Medal in recognition of lifetime achievement as a global maritime and naval historian "through some thirty major volumes and numerous articles, [...] a body of work which has earned him international acclaim as a Canadian scholar of the highest order." A life member of the Society for the History of Discoveries, Gough was in November 2019 named a Fellow of the Society for his publications in Canadian and British imperial and naval history, his record of teaching and mentoring students, particularly at Wilfrid Laurier University and for contributions to the scholarly community of imperial, international and maritime historians.

Gough has received the Psi Upsilon Distinguished Service Alumnus Award, the Wilfrid Laurier University Alumni Hoffmann-Little Award for Outstanding Teaching, and the 2019 Distinguished Alumni Award from the University of Victoria. For civic contributions in Ontario and British Columbia, he received the Queen Elizabeth II Golden Jubilee Medal. In November 2014, he received the Maritime Museum of B.C.'s 2014 SS Beaver Medal for Maritime Excellence.

Prizes include medals, awards, and honourable mentions from multiple organisations including the North American Society for Oceanic History. The Keith Matthews Award recognizes publications in the field of nautical research. When Possessing Meares Island won it in 2022, it was the fourth time Gough's books had been given the award.

== Published works ==
Gough's dissertation, the basis of his first book, argued that British Columbia owed its existence to British sea power and that the Hudson's Bay Company was not the only agent in the commercial and political project of creating British Columbia's boundaries. "I've always felt the seas were blindsided in the writing of Canadian history, and I have made it my particular calling to turn that around," Gough said in 1994. The 1997 account of Sir Alexander Mackenzie's overland explorations to the Arctic and Pacific coasts, First Across the Continent, has been called a central contribution to the study of North American exploration in the 18th and 19th centuries. The Elusive Mr. Pond, is a study of the soldier, fur trader, and explorer Peter Pond historically important in pushing northwest into the Mackenzie River basin and establishing the North West Company.

Pax Britannica in 2014 explored British naval reach and the guarding of imperial commerce during the post-Napoleonic century.

Churchill and Fisher: Titans at the Admiralty (2017) is an inquiry into the role of personality in the making of history: the administration of the Royal Navy in the Great War by First Sea Lord Admiral Sir John ("Jacky") Fisher and his young political master, Winston Churchill. In The Times Literary Supplement, Jan Morris wrote: "This enthralling book by an eminent Canadian naval historian is a work of profound scholarship and interpretation... Barry Gough has himself heightened the book's sense of personal drama by surrounding his central characters with powerful expositions of the state of the world around them." The Australian Naval Institute forum noted that the author "distilled and weighed the rancor, political intrigue, strategic and operational challenges and the (mostly) dismal record of the war at sea up to Jutland." One military-website commentator, observing that Gough writes "history as literature," says this "places Dr. Gough in a distinguished company of historians who are also great and readable writers. Sir Steven Runciman, Barbara Tuchman, and Sir Winston Churchill come to mind."

His research in Spanish and English archival sources became the 2018 book with co-author Charles Borras, The War Against the Pirates: British and American Suppression of Caribbean Piracy in the Early Nineteenth Century, which examines the roots of piracy in those seas and how its suppression laid the foundation for the decline of the Spanish empire in the Americas. The third edition of the Historical Dictionary of Canada, edited by Stephen Azzi and Barry M. Gough, was published in April 2021. This carried forward Gough's work in the 1999 and 2010 editions.

Possessing Meares Island won the 2021 Lieutenant Governor's Medal for Historical Writing and was a finalist for the BC and Yukon Book Prizes' Roderick Haig-Brown Regional Prize, the 2022 BC Book Awards' George Ryga Award for Social Awareness in Literature, the John W. Dafoe Book Prize and the 2022 City of Victoria Butler Book Prize. This account of the evolving Meares Island situation and Gough's research participation in it won the Keith Matthews Award for Best Book at the 2022 AGM of the Canadian Nautical Research Society. Judges noted that the book links "early maritime history, Indigenous land rights, and modern environmental advocacy in the Clayoquot Sound region" and "connects 18th-century Indigenous-colonial trade relations to more recent historical upheavals and bridges the gap between centuries." The North American Society for Oceanic History (NASOH) in June 2022 awarded the book the John Lyman Award in Canadian Naval and Maritime History. Dave Obee, editor-in-chief and publisher of the Times Colonist, described the Meares Island book as "a superb examination of a rather small location that is highly significant to British Columbia as a whole" and that it brought together Indigenous history, maritime history, land rights, and environmental issues. Aimee Greenaway of British Columbia History interviewed the author about the initial legal research and how the "complicated story" evolved over hundreds of years.

The Curious Passage of Richard Blanshard, First Governor of Vancouver Island sets out the personalities and circumstances converging on Vancouver Island as the first governor of the colony arrived in March 1830. Gough gathers what's known of Blanshard's life and details the events of the post-boundary settlement era in the colony. "Unpaid, suffering from malaria and stymied by James Douglas of the Hudson's Bay Company," writes Dave Obee, "the first colonial governor of Vancouver Island still managed to establish the government on Vancouver Island." This "case study in British imperial governance" is described as "an engaging and largely sympathetic portrait of an oft-forgotten figure in the colonial history of British Columbia." Later reporting in London to an 1857 Select Standing Committee, Blanshard answered their 260 questions about Vancouver Island, having been made an unwelcome place for settlers and "took his revenge on Douglas and the company, testifying to the corruption under their rule." The book won an honourable mention for the BC Historical Federation Historical Writing Awards in May 2024, and was evaluated in detail in the Literary Review of Canada. Dave Flawse and Aimee Greenaway each posted interviews about Blanshard's story.

Gough's podcast series explores British Columbia from 1871 to 1914, from its years as a colonial outpost to the start of World War I — immigration, economic expansion, and political upheaval.

== Selected bibliography ==
- The Royal Navy and the Northwest Coast of North America, 1810–1914: A Study of British Maritime Ascendancy. UBC Press, 1971. ISBN 0-7748-0000-3. Rev. edition, 2016.
- Canada. Modern Nations in Historical Perspective Series. Prentice Hall, 1975. ISBN 0-13-112789-6.
- New Dimensions in Ethnohistory: Papers of the Second Laurier Conference on Ethnohistory and Ethnology. Huron College, University of Western Ontario, 1983. Co-edited with Laird Christie. Canadian Ethnology Service, Mercury Series Paper 120. Ottawa: Canadian Museum of Civilization, 1991. ISBN 0-660-12911-6.
- The Northwest Coast: British Navigation, Trade and Discoveries to 1812. UBC Press, 1992. ISBN 0-7748-0399-1. UBC Press 1980 first edition published as Distant Dominion.
- Gunboat Frontier: British Maritime Authority and Northwest Coast Indians. UBC Press. 1984. ISBN 978-0-7748-0175-1.
- British Mercantile Interests in the Making of the Peace of Paris, 1763: Trade, War and Empire. Studies in British History. Edwin Mellen Press, 1992. ISBN 978-0773495487
- The Falkland Islands/Malvinas: The Contest for Empire in the South Atlantic. London: Continuum, 1992/Athlone Press, 1992. ISBN 978-0-485-11419-5.
- First Across the Continent: Sir Alexander Mackenzie. Norman, Oklahoma: University of Oklahoma Press. 1997. ISBN 978-0-8061-3002-6.; Toronto: McClelland & Stewart, 1997. ISBN 978-0-7710-3406-0.
- "Possessing Meares Island," The Journal of Canadian Studies 33, no. 2 (Summer 1998), 177–85.
- Fighting Sail on Lake Huron and Georgian Bay: The War of 1812 and its Aftermath. Naval Institute Press/Vanwell Publishing. 2002. ISBN 978-1-55750-314-5.
- Geography and Exploration: Biographical Portraits. Vol. 4, Scribner Science Reference Series. Princeton, N.J.: Charles Scribner's Sons, 2002. ISBN 0-684-80662-2.
- Through Water, Ice, and Fire: Schooner Nancy of the War of 1812. Dundurn Press Ltd. 2006. ISBN 978-1-55002-569-9. "Barry M. Gough."
- Britain, Canada, and the North Pacific: Maritime Enterprise and Dominion, 1778-1914. Ashgate Variorum, 2004. ISBN 0-86078-939-X.
- Fortune's a River: The Collision of Empires in Northwest America. Harbour Publishing, 2007. ISBN 1-55017-428-2.
- HMCS Haida: Anatomy of a Destroyer. Vanwell Publishing/Looking Back Press, 2009. ISBN 978-1550689587
- Historical Dreadnoughts: Arthur Marder, Stephen Roskill and Battles for Naval History. Seaforth/Pen & Sword, 2010. ISBN 978-1-84832-077-2.
- Juan de Fuca's Strait: Voyages in the Waterway of Forgotten Dreams. Madeira Park: Harbour Publishing, 2012. ISBN 978-1-55017-573-8.
- From Classroom to Battlefield: Victoria High School and the First World War. Heritage House Publishing, 2014. ISBN 978-1-77203-006-8.
- The Elusive Mr. Pond: The Soldier, Fur Trader and Explorer Who Opened the Northwest. Douglas & McIntyre, 2014. ISBN 978-1-77162-039-0.
- Pax Britannica: Ruling the Waves and Keeping the Peace before Armageddon. Palgrave Macmillan, 2014. ISBN 978-0-23035-430-2.
- Britannia's Navy on the West Coast of North America, 1812–1914. Heritage House Publishing, 2016, in Canada. ISBN 978-1-77203-109-6, and Seaforth Publishing, 2016, in Great Britain ISBN 978-1-4738-8136-5
- "The Caneing in Conduit Street," Trafalgar Chronicle: Journal of the 1805 Club 25 (2015), 201–12.
- That Hamilton Woman: Emma and Nelson. Seaforth Publishing, 2016 ISBN 978-1-4738-7563-0, in conjunction with the exhibition Emma Hamilton: Seduction and Celebrity, 3 Nov 2016 – 17 Apr 2017, National Maritime Museum, Greenwich; and Annapolis, MD: Naval Institute Press, 2016. ISBN 1591146135.
- Barry Gough and Charles Borras. The War Against the Pirates: British and American Suppression of Caribbean Piracy in the Early Nineteenth Century. London: Palgrave Macmillan, 2018. ISBN 978-0-230-35481-4; EPUB ISBN 978-1-137-31414-7
- The Historical Dictionary of Canada. Scarecrow Press. 1999. ISBN 978-0-8108-3541-2. 2nd ed., Scarecrow Press, October 2010. 3rd ed., Stephen Azzi and Barry M. Gough, eds. Rowman & Littlefield, April 2021. ISBN 978-1-5381-2033-0, ISBN 978-1-5381-2034-7 eBook.
- Possessing Meares Island: A Historian's Journey into the Past of Clayoquot Sound. Madeira Park: Harbour Publishing, 2021. Hardcover ISBN 978-1-550-17957-6 ; EPUB ISBN 978-1-550-17958-3
- The Curious Passage of Richard Blanshard, First Governor of Vancouver Island. Madeira Park: Harbour Publishing, 2023. Hardcover ISBN 978-1-990776-38-0; EPUB ISBN 978-1-990776-397
- Francis Drake and Nova Albion: Elizabethan Voyaging on the Far Side of the World. Madeira Park: Harbour Publishing, 1 November 2026. Hardcover ISBN 978-1-998-52677-2. EPUB to follow.

== See also ==
- Churchill College, Cambridge
