= Tischner =

Tischner is a German surname. Notable people with the surname include:

- Christian Tischner (born 1981), German politician
- Józef Tischner (1931–2000), Polish priest and philosopher
- Rudolf Tischner (1879–1961), German ophthalmologist and parapsychologist

== See also ==
- Tischer
