= Catherine Whistler =

Irish art historian

Catherine Whistler is an Irish art historian and curator, specialising in Italian Renaissance and Baroque art. She is Keeper of Western Art at the Ashmolean Museum, a supernumerary fellow of St John's College, Oxford, and Professor of the History of European Art at the University of Oxford.

In 2018, Whistler was awarded the British Academy Medal for her book Venice and Drawing, 1500-1800: Theory, Practice and Collection; the Medal is awarded "for landmark academic achievement in any of the humanities and social science disciplines supported by the Academy".

== Selected works ==
- Whistler, Catherine (2010). Paolo Uccello's The hunt in the forest. Oxford: Ashmolean Museum. ISBN 978-1854442482.
- Whiteley, Jon; Whistler, Catherine (2013). Master Drawings: Michelangelo to Moore. Oxford: Ashmolean Museum. ISBN 978-1854442789.
- Whistler, Catherine (2015). Drawing in Venice: Titian to Canaletto. Oxford: Ashmolean Museum. ISBN 978-1854442994.
- Whistler, Catherine (2017). Venice & drawing, 1500-1800: theory, practice and collecting. New Haven, CT: Yale University Press. ISBN 978-0300187731.
- Whistler, Catherine (2017). Raphael: the drawings. Oxford: Ashmolean Museum. ISBN 978-1910807156.
