= Mountbatten Maritime Prize =

The Mountbatten Maritime Award is awarded annually by the Maritime Foundation (formerly the British Maritime Charitable Foundation) to the author of a distinguished publication that has made a significant contribution to the maritime history of the United Kingdom. The prize is a piece of silver plate. Before 2018 it was known as The Mountbatten Maritime Award for Best Literary Contribution. From 2018 it is known as The Mountbatten Award for Best Book. The Trustees of the Maritime Foundation award the prize based on the recommendation of an Awards Committee.

== Recipients ==
Source: Maritime Foundation

Mountbatten Maritime Award

- 2000 Rear-Admiral J. Richard Hill
- 2001 Jim Ring, We Come Unseen
- 2002 Andrew Williams and the BBC Battle of the Atlantic Team
- 2003 Peter Padfield, Maritime Power and the Struggle for Freedom
- 2004 Tom Pocock, Stopping Napoleon - War and Intrigue in the Mediterranean
- 2005 Professor R. J. B. Knight, The Pursuit of Victory - The Life and Achievements of Horatio Nelson
- 2006 Nicolette Jones, The Plimsoll Sensation
- 2007 Captain Andrew Welch FNI RN Rtd, The Royal Navy and the Cod Wars
- 2008 Tim Clayton, Tars: The Men who Made Britain Rule the Waves
- 2009 Kate Lance, Alan Villiers: Voyager of the Winds
- 2010 Richard Guilliatt & Peter Hohnen, The Wolf: How One German Raider Terrorised the Southern Seas during the First World War
- 2011 David Abulafia, The Great Sea: A Human History of the Mediterranean
- 2014 Andrew Adams & Richard Woodman, Light upon the Waters: the History of Trinity House
- 2015 Barry Gough, Pax Britannica: Ruling the Waves and Keeping the Peace before Armageddon
- 2016 Peter Hennessy & James Jinks, The Silent Deep: The Royal Navy Submarine Service Since 1945
- 2017 Reginald Cogswell, Exeter: A Cruiser of the Medium Size

Mountbatten Award

- 2018 David Mearns, The Shipwreck Hunter: A Lifetime of Extraordinary Deep-Sea Discoveries
- 2019 Rachel Slade, Into the Raging Sea: Thirty-Three Mariners, One Megastorm, and the Sinking of El Faro
- 2020 Professor David Abulafia, The Boundless Sea: A Human History of The Oceans
- 2021 Andrew Boyd, British Naval Intelligence through the Twentieth Century
- 2022 Alysha Rooks, The Black Joke: The True Story of One British Ship's Battle Against the Slave Trade

== See also ==
- List of history awards
- List of literary awards
- List of awards named after people
