= Timothy Bruce Mitford =

Historian

Commander Timothy Bruce Mitford, FSA, is a historian and retired Royal Navy officer.

== Early life and military career ==
The son of the archaeologist Terence Bruce Mitford, Timothy Bruce Mitford read classics at Corpus Christi College, Oxford. He then began studying towards a DPhil at the University of Oxford in 1962 or 1963 on the Euphrates frontier of the Roman Empire; his supervisor was Sir Ian Richmond. Mitford had earlier completed his National Service in the Royal Navy, and returned to it in 1965. He was commissioned as a sub-lieutenant in 1966 and promoted to lieutenant-commander in 1973. From 1981, he served in the headquarters of the Turkish Naval Forces.

== Scholarship and recognition ==
Mitford remained interested in uncovering the eastern frontier of the Roman Empire, a task which took him nearly half a century to finish. He was able to carry out research in Turkey in 1966, 1967 and 1972. He finally completed his doctoral thesis with the title "The Roman Frontier Based on the Valley of the Upper Euphrates from the Black Sea to Samosata". It was submitted in five volumes and the degree was awarded in 1973. Between 1974 and 2002, the British Academy (the UK's national academy for the humanities) awarded Mitford research grants to continue his project. The frontier, which spanned from Syria to the Black Sea, was largely unknown and had to be explored mainly on foot, sometimes through politically unstable regions. Permits were difficult to obtain in the 1980s and 1990s as officials suspected him of being spy; he was arrested in 1984, accused of spying for Armenia. Mitford usually required armed escorts. By 2006, he was ready to write up his research.

His efforts ultimately led to the publication by Oxford University Press in 2017 of East of Asia Minor: Rome's Hidden Frontier, which appeared in two volumes. and 757 pages. The historian James Howard-Johnston wrote of the books that "the workmanship is as intricate and careful as that of a watchmaker ... The reviewer is dumbfounded at the amount of material gathered and the lucidity with which it is presented". Mitford received the British Academy Medal in 2018 for his achievement. Given to a maximum of three people a year, the award "recognises outstanding achievement that has transformed understanding of a particular subject or field of study in ... any branch of the humanities and social sciences".
