= Fintan Cullen =

Irish academic

Fintan Cullen (born 3 January 1954) in Dublin, is an Irish academic, educator and writer. Cullen is a professor at the University of Nottingham.

== National Portrait Gallery Exhibit ==
He and Roy Foster co-created the exhibit Conquering England: Ireland in Victorian England, which was in the National Portrait Gallery in London from 9 March 2005 to 19 June 2005. They also co-wrote a book that accompanied the exhibit. The name comes from G. B. Shaw's mordant observation that "England had conquered Ireland, so there was nothing for it but to come over and conquer England."

The exhibition explored the diversity of the Irish in London and their influence in the visual arts, literature, theatre, journalism and politics. It featured portraits of Shaw, Oscar Wilde, W. B. Yeats and Charles Stewart Parnell.

Conquering England also included painters, sculptors, politicians, journalists, theatrical entrepreneurs (including Bram Stoker, the author of Dracula) ... [t]he reign of Queen Victoria was characterized by a contentious and contradictory relationship between Ireland and Britain ... with the Parnellite Irish Parliamentary Party holding the balance of power at Westminster in the 1880s and Parnell himself being the focus of intense controversy ... [the] Irish were prominent in other spheres, notably medicine and the law, but the worlds of the visual arts, politics, literature and the stage retain the most vivid impression of Irish influence in Queen Victoria's reign ... [by] the end of the period, ... the Celtic craze and events such as the new Abbey Theatre's visits to London ... coincided with the return of the cultural focus to Dublin, to an Ireland undergoing political radicalization and cultural renaissance."
