= Tom Pocock =

British writer

- Born: Thomas Allcot Guy Pocock; 18 August 1925; London
- Died: 7 May 2007 (aged 81); London

Academic work
- Main interests: military historian, maritime history, Royal Navy

Thomas Allcot Guy Pocock (18 August 1925 – 7 May 2007) was an English biographer, war correspondent, journalist and naval historian.

== Life ==
He was the son of the novelist and educationist Guy Pocock, who taught Lord Mountbatten at Dartmouth, and Dorothy Bowers. He was educated at West Downs and Westminster School. He joined the Royal Navy in 1943, being present at D-Day and then serving as naval "minder" to war correspondents covering the Battle of Normandy. Falling ill, by the end of 1944 he was demobbed [demobilized], and became a war correspondent at only 19 years old. He spent four years with the Hulton Press current affairs magazine group, being one of the first journalists to see Bergen-Belsen concentration camp and learning his trade from Alan Moorehead (later becoming his biographer). He then moved on to be a feature-writer and then Naval Correspondent on the Daily Mail, and then (in 1952) Naval Correspondent of The Times.

He was a foreign correspondent and special writer for the Daily Express from 1956 to 1959, then from 1959 was feature writer, Defence Correspondent, war correspondent and finally Travel Editor on the Evening Standard.

In 1969 he married Penny Casson, a granddaughter of Sir Lewis Casson and Dame Sybil Thorndike; they had two daughters. He won the Mountbatten Maritime Prize in 2004.

== Relatives ==
Tom Pocock's family included Vice-Admiral Sir George Pocock, K.B. (who was the captor of Havana in the Seven Years' War), the marine painter Nicholas Pocock and his aunt Doris Pocock who was an author of girls' school stories.

== Works ==
- Nelson and His World (1967), his first book, written on his return from reporting the Aden Emergency
- Chelsea Reach: The Brutal Friendship of Whistler and Walter Greaves (1970)
- London Walks: 30 Walks in and Around London (1973)
- Fighting General: The Public and Private Campaigns of General Sir Walter Walker (1973)
- Remember Nelson: The Life of Captain Sir William Hoste (1977)
- The Young Nelson in the Americas (1980)
- 1945: The Dawn Came Up Like Thunder (1983)
- East and West of Suez: The Retreat from the Empire (1986)
- Horatio Nelson (1987), runner-up for the Whitbread Biography Award
- Alan Moorehead (1990)
- Sailor King: The Life of King William IV (1991)
- Essential Venice, The Essential Travel Guides (1991)
- Rider Haggard and the Lost Empire: A Biography (1993)
- Norfolk, Pimlico County History Guides (1995)
- A Thirst for Glory, The Life of Admiral Sir Sidney Smith (1996)
- Travels of a London Schoolboy, 1826–1830: John Pocock's Diary of Life in London and Voyages to Cape Town and the Swan River Settlement (editor, 1996)
- Battle for Empire: The Very First World War 1756–63 (1998)
- Captain Marryat: Seaman, Writer and Adventurer (2000)
- Nelson's Women (2002)
- The Terror Before Trafalgar: Nelson, Napoleon and the Secret War (2002)
- Stopping Napoleon: War and Intrigue in the Mediterranean (2004)
- A History of Chelsea Old Church: The Church that Refused to Die, with Alan Russett (2004)
- Trafalgar: An Eyewitness History (2005)
- Breaking the Chains: The Royal Navy's War on White Slavery (2006)
