= Military Revolution =

Theory on gunpowder weapons and governments

The Military Revolution is the theory that a series of radical changes in military strategy and tactics during the 16th and 17th centuries resulted in major lasting changes in governments and society. The theory was introduced by Michael Roberts in the 1950s as he focused on Sweden (1560–1660) searching for major changes in the European way of war caused by the introduction of portable firearms. Roberts linked military technology with larger historical consequences, arguing that innovations in tactics, drill and doctrine by the Dutch and Swedes (1560–1660), which maximized the utility of firearms, led to a need for more trained troops and thus for permanent forces (standing armies). Armies grew much larger and more expensive. These changes in turn had major political consequences in the level of administrative support and the supply of money, men and provisions, producing new financial demands and the creation of new governmental institutions. "Thus, argued Roberts, the modern art of war made possible—and necessary—the creation of the modern state".

In the 1990s the concept was modified and extended by Geoffrey Parker, who argued that developments in fortification and siege warfare caused the revolution. Parker also argues that the military revolution in Europe gave European powers a distinct advantage, making it possible for the relatively small European powers to conquer the Americas, as well as large parts of Africa and Asia. Parker's argument has been criticized by Cambridge University political scientist Jason Sharman.

The concept of a military revolution during this time has received a mixed reception among historians. Noted military historians Michael Duffy and Jeremy Black strongly criticized the theory and have described it as misleading, exaggerated, and simplistic. Other authors argued against the concept of a military revolution starting in the Dutch armies, stating that it needs either to be heavily revised or abandoned altogether.

== Origin of the concept ==
Roberts first proposed the concept of a military revolution in 1955 in a lecture before the Queen's University of Belfast, later published as an article, "The Military Revolution, 1560–1660," that argued European methods of warfare changed profoundly during the Early Modern Period.

== Chronology ==
Mr Roberts placed his military revolution around 1560–1660 as the period in which linear tactics were developed to take advantage of the increasingly effective gunpowder weapons; however, that chronology has been challenged by many scholars.

Ayton and Price have remarked on the importance of the "Infantry Revolution" taking place in the early 14th century, and David Eltis has pointed out that the real change to gunpowder weapons and the elaboration of a military doctrine according to that change took place in the early 16th century, not, as Roberts defended, in the late 16th century.

Others have defended a later period for the military change. Jeremy Black thinks that the key time period was that of 1660–1710, which saw an exponential growth in the size of European armies, while Clifford J. Rogers has developed the idea of successive military revolutions at different periods, first an "infantry revolution" in the 14th century, secondly an "artillery revolution" in the 15th century, thirdly a "fortifications revolution" in the 16th, fourth a "fire weapons" revolution between 1580 and 1630, and finally a fifth revolution, the increase in size of European armies, between 1650 and 1715. Similarly, Geoffrey Parker has extended the period of the military revolution from 1450 to 1800, the period in which Europeans achieved supremacy over the rest of the world. Some scholars have questioned the revolutionary character of an evolution through four centuries. Clifford Rogers has suggested that the military revolution can best be compared with the concept of "punctuated equilibrium evolution" (a theory originating in biology), meaning short bursts of rapid military innovation followed by longer periods of relative stagnation. Fernando González de León, who criticized the notion of a military revolution starting in the Dutch Army, pointed instead towards a gradual evolution taking place during the 16th century.

The military revolution failed in the Ottoman Empire. According to a 2013 study, there are two factors that explain this failure: "civil-military relations and historical timing. In the Ottoman Empire, the emergence of an institutionally strong and internally cohesive army during the early stages of state formation—in the late fourteenth century—equipped the military with substantial bargaining powers. In contrast, the great powers of Europe drew heavily on private providers of military power during the military revolution and developed similar armies only by the second half of the seventeenth century, limiting the bargaining leverage of European militaries over their rulers. In essence, the Ottoman standing army was able to block reform efforts that it believed challenged its parochial interests."

== Tactics ==
=== Linear tactics ===
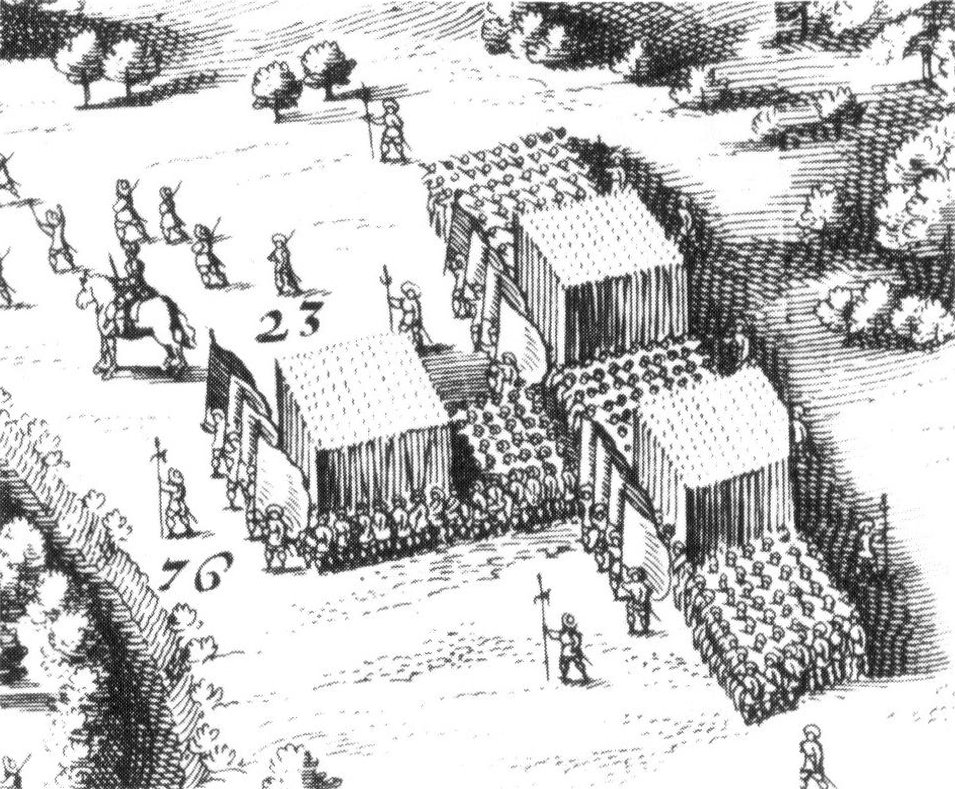
Swedish Brigade deployed in six ranks, one company deep (every flag represents a company)

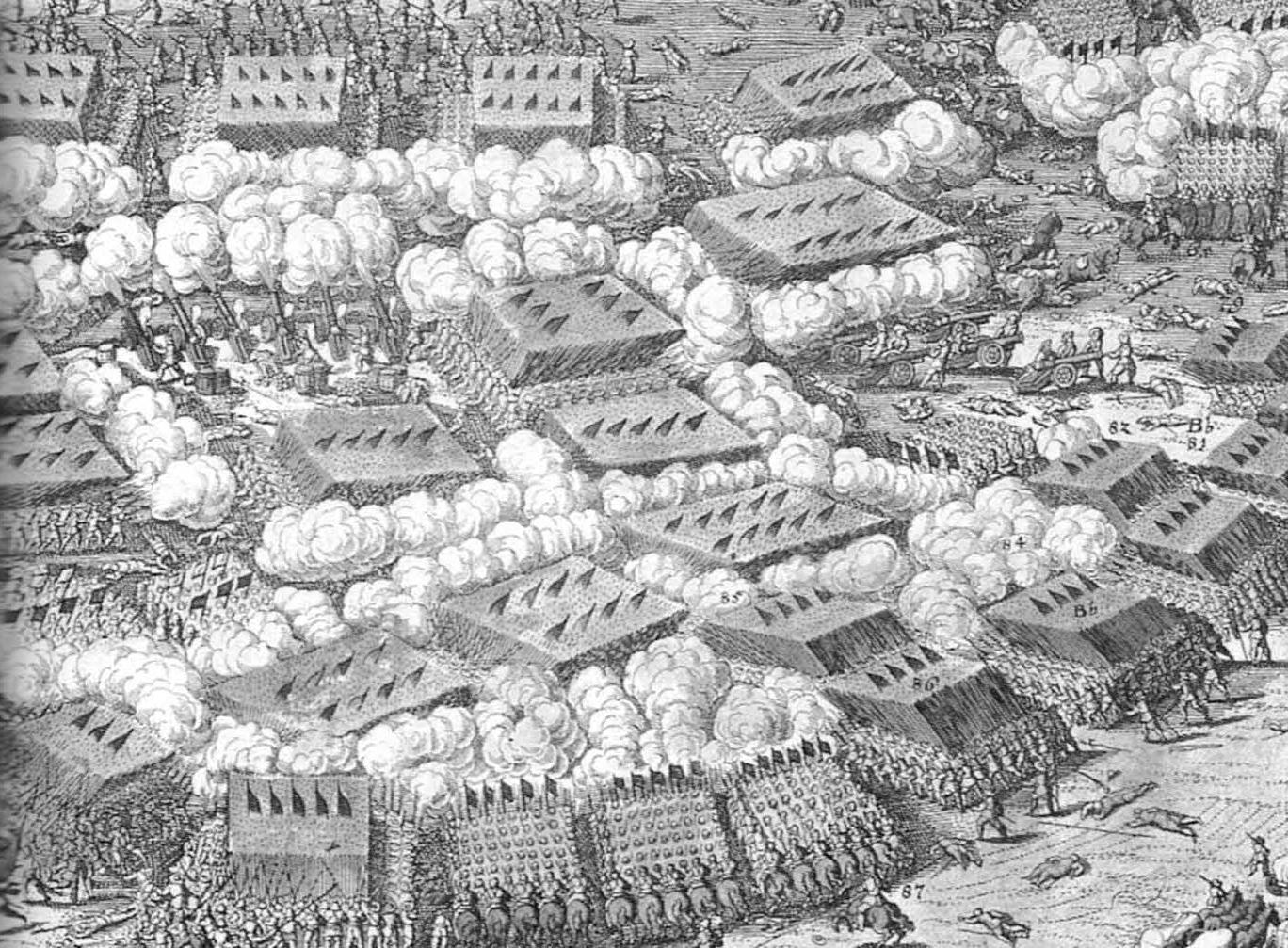
Breitenfeld. The Catholic formations (to the left) are deployed two companies deep, while the Swedish (to the right) are deployed just one company deep.

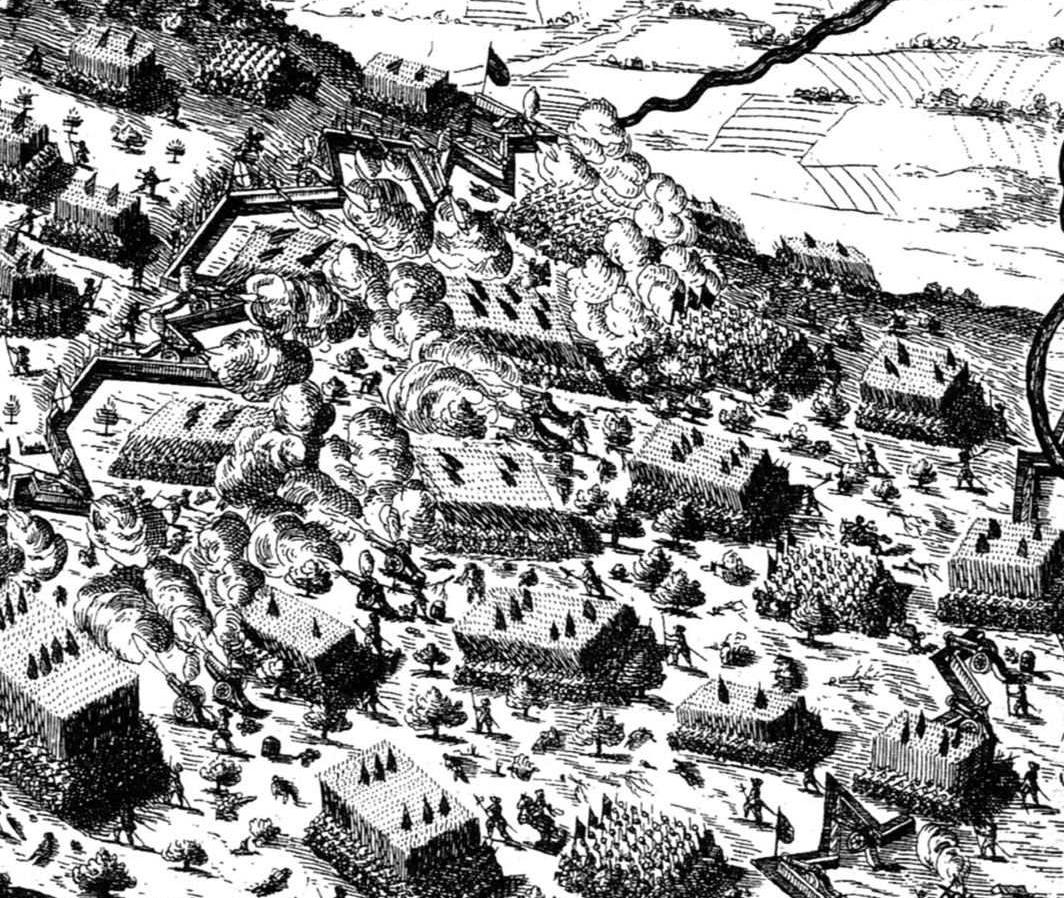
Alte Veste. Swedish assault columns deployed two companies deep.

Shallow formations are ideally suited for defensive deployments, but they are clumsy in offensive missions: the longer the frontage, the more difficult to maintain order and cohesion, or to perform any maneuver, especially wheeling. Gustavus Adolphus understood well that far from being slow and ponderous, the assault columns like those used by Tilly were in fact faster and more flexible, and the Swedish King made use of them when required, like in the battle of Alte Veste (see picture 3).

Armies did start to use thinner formations, but in a slow evolution, and subjected to tactical considerations. (Note: Linear formations marked an increase in infantry defensive capacity through the emphasis on static firepower and a decrease in offensive capability due to shallower formations, battle will tend to be resolved by the cavalry wings instead.) Firearms were not so effective as to determine solely the deployment of troops, (Note: In this regard, the introduction of regimental guns should be considered as an "option" rather than a "development" because the increase in firepower was offset by other considerations, they slowed down the advance of infantry and added a considerable logistic burden that many considered they were not worth; for instance France, the rising Big Power at the time, discarded them after a brief experience in her army) other considerations were also observed, like units' experience, (Note: The more experienced the unit, the thinner the formation.) assigned mission, terrain, or the need to meet a required frontage with an understrength unit. The debate of line vs column was carried through the 18th Century up to Napoleonic times, with a temporary reverse to deep columns in the later campaigns of the Napoleonic Wars.

Ironically, depth reduction in cavalry formations was a more permanent change introduced by Gustavus Adolphus. In conjunction with less reliance on pistol fire it had the net effect of favouring shock action over firepower, contrary to the tendency defended by Roberts.

=== Trace italienne ===
Roberts' linear tactics concept had an early critic in the younger historian Geoffrey Parker, who asked why the supposedly outdated Spanish tercios defeated the Swedish linear formations at the battle of Nördlingen in 1634. Parker instead suggested that the key development was the appearance of the trace italienne fortifications in early modern Europe. In this view, the difficulty of taking such fortifications resulted in a profound change in military strategy. "Wars became a series of protracted sieges", Parker suggests, and open-pitch battles became "irrelevant" in regions where the trace italienne existed. Ultimately, Parker argues, "military geography", in other words the existence or absence of the trace italienne in a given area, shaped military strategy in the early modern period, and lead to the creation of larger armies necessary to besiege the new fortresses and to garrison them. In this way, Parker placed the birth of the Military Revolution in the early 16th century. He also gives it a new significance; not only was it a factor in the growth of the State, it was also the main factor (together with the "Naval Revolution") in the rise of the West over other Civilizations.

This model has been criticised on several grounds. Jeremy Black pointed that it was the development of the State that allowed the growth in size of the armies, not the other way around, and found Parker guilty of "Technological Determinism". More tellingly, the figures presented by Parker to sustain his idea about the growth of armies have been severely criticised by David Eltis as lacking consistency and David Parrott has proved that the period of the trace italienne did not show any significant growth in the size of French armies and that the late period of the Thirty Years War showed an increase in the proportion of cavalry in the armies, contrary to Parker's thesis that the prevalence of siege warfare marked a decrease of its importance.

=== The infantry revolution and the decline of cavalry ===
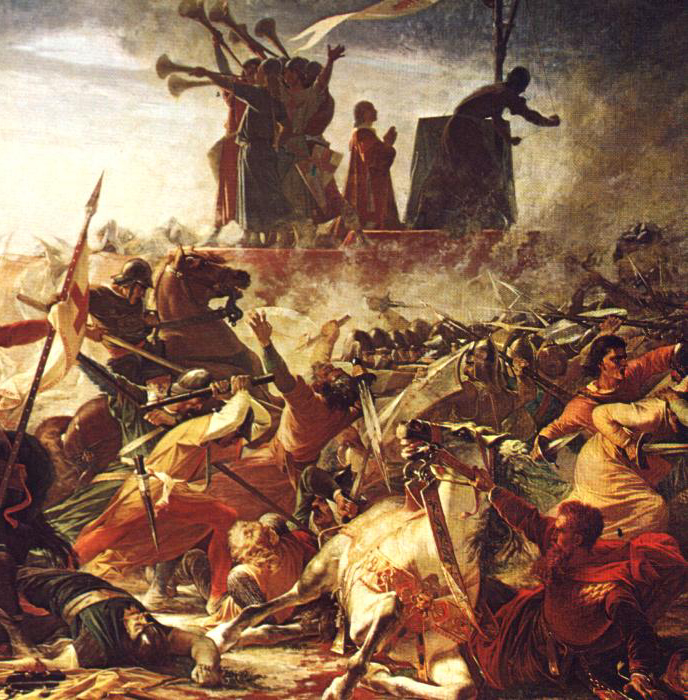
The defence of the Carroccio during the battle of Legnano (1176) by Amos Cassioli (1832–1891)

Some Medieval specialists elaborated on the idea of an infantry revolution happening early in the 14th century, when in some relevant battles, like Courtrai (1302), Bannockburn (1314) or Halmyros (1311), heavy cavalry was routed by infantry; however, it can be pointed out that in all those battles infantry was entrenched or positioned in rough terrain unsuited for cavalry, like in other battles of the 14th and 15th century in which cavalry was defeated. In fact infantry had been victorious in earlier times in similar situations, for instance at the battle of Legnano in 1176, but in open ground infantry still had the worst, as shown for instance at the battle of Patay (1429) and the battle of Formigny (1450) in which the vaunted English longbowmen were easily run down; however, the experience of battles like Courtrai and Bannockburn meant that the myth of the invincible knight disappeared, which was in itself important for transforming medieval warfare.

More substance has the case for the "return of Heavy Infantry" as Carey has named it. Pikemen, unlike other infantry, could stand in the open against heavy cavalry. While requiring drill and discipline, individual training requirements were much lower than those for knights, and the switch from heavily armoured knight to footsoldier made possible the expansion in the size of armies from the late 15th century onwards as infantry could be trained more quickly and could be hired in great numbers. But that change was slow.

The full development, in the 15th century, of plate armour for both man and horse, combined with the use of the arret (lance rest) which could support a heavier lance, ensured that the heavy cavalryman remained a formidable warrior. Without cavalry, a 15th-century army was unlikely to achieve a decisive victory on the field of battle; battle might be decided by archers or pikemen, but a retreat could only be cut off effectively or followed-up by cavalry. In the 16th century, a lighter, less expensive cavalry gained ground, so that the proportion of cavalry in the armies actually grew continually, so that in the last battles of the Thirty Years War cavalry actually outnumbered infantry as never before since the high feudal period.

Another change that took place in the late 15th century was the improvement in siege artillery as to render old style fortifications very vulnerable. But the supremacy of tactical offence in siege warfare was not to last for very long. As Philippe Contamine has noted, by a dialectical process which may be found in all periods, progress in the art of siege was answered by progress in the art of fortification, and vice versa. Charles VIII's invasion of Italy in 1494 demonstrated the potency of siege artillery; but in this region by the early years of the 16th century there were beginning to emerge fortifications which had been designed specifically to resist artillery bombardment. The full impact the 15th-century "artillery revolution" was blunted fairly quickly by the development of the bastion and the trace italienne. But the military supremacy which the possession of a powerful siege train conferred contributed in no small degree to that strengthening of royal authority which we find in some European states in the later 15th century.

== Size of armies ==
The increase in army size and its influence on the development of Modern States is an important point in the military revolution theory. For example, Spain's army increased from mere tens of thousands in the late 15th century to 300,000 regulars and 500,000 militia (paper strength) by 1625 spread all throughout Europe, according to Philip IV. However, exact estimates are hard to calculate for various reasons. There are several sources for the study of the size of armies in different periods.

=== Administrative sources ===
Size of European armies 1630–1710
Population ~1650 (millions)		Size of Army (thousands)		
State	Size	Size of Army (thousands)		
Denmark–Norway	1.3	30–40	35	53
Sweden	1.1	45	70	100
Brandenburg-Prussia	0.5	12	8	40
Polish–Lithuanian Commonwealth	11	17	53	50
Polish–Lithuanian Commonwealth	11	17	53	100*
Tsardom of Russia	15	45	92	170
Kingdom of England	4.7	. .	70	87
Dutch Republic	1.5	70	30	120
Kingdom of France	18	200	100	340–380
Habsburg monarchy	8	100	20–24	110–130
Crown of Castile; Crown of Aragon	7	300	100	50
Ottoman Empire	18	40**	50**	50**
* All Polish forces, on both sides in the Great Northern War.		** Janissaries only.		

By their own nature they are the more objective sources available. Since Napoleonic Wars European Commanders had at their disposal periodical strength reports of their units. Those strength reports are the main source for research in conflicts in 19th and 20th centuries, however they are not without problems, different armies count effective strength in different ways, and in some instances reports are inflated by commanding officers to look good to their superiors.

Another source was muster calls, non-periodical strength reports of the personnel ready for duty. Muster calls are the main source for the strength of armies before the 19th century, but by their own nature they lack continuity and are ill-suited for long time period analysis. They are, however, the most reliable source for the period and do provide a general picture of army strengths and their variability. (Note: For instance between the muster at Duben and the Muster at Breitenfeld the Swedish army lost more than 10% of its infantry in just two days, this kind of conduct would be typical before a major battle was to be fought.)

Thirdly, pay rolls provide another set of information. They are especially useful to study army costs, but they are not so reliable as muster calls as they only show payments, not real soldiers ready for duty, and before the 19th century "ghost soldiers", men falsely enlisted by officers in order to get the fees for themselves, were a very common occurrence.

Finally, Orders of Battle, lists of units without specifying strength, are very important for the 16th, 17th and 18th centuries. Before that period armies lacked the organization to deploy permanent units, so that orders of battle usually consist in an enumeration of leaders with commands. The exception for Ancient Times would be the Roman army, that from an early period developed a considerable military organization. An Order of Battle is not a reliable source for army strength, since units in campaign, or even in peace time periods, are rarely if ever at full authorized strength.

=== Narrative sources ===
Modern historians make use of the large amount of administrative sources available now, however things were very different in the past. Pre-modern writers too many times give numbers without naming sources, and there are few cases in which we can be sure they are actually using any administrative source. That is especially true when they speak about enemy armies, in which the access to administrative sources was in any case problematic. Besides that, there are a number of additional problems concerning pre-modern historians; they could be very biased in their reports, as inflating the number of enemies has been one of the favourite propagandistic resources of all times. Even when presenting a balanced account, many historians did not possess military experience, thus they lacked the technical judgement to properly assess and critique their sources. On the other hand, they had access to first hand accounts that could be very interesting, although in the subject of numbers were rarely accurate.

Historians consider pre-modern narrative sources to be highly unreliable on the subject of numbers, so that it is not possible to make use of them in a pair to administrative sources. Comparatives between modern and pre-modern periods are thus very difficult.

=== Size of overall armies ===
A clear differentiation should be established between Overall armies, i.e., the overall armed forces of a given political entity, and Field Armies, tactical units capable of moving as a single force along a campaign. The growth in size of overall armies has been considered by several scholars as a key issue of the Military Revolution. There are two main theses: it has been either considered a consequence of the economic and demographic growth of the 17th–18th century or the main cause for the growth of the administration and centralization of the Modern State in the same period.

However, some opponents of the general thesis have challenged those views, for instance I.A.A. Thompson has noted how the growth in size of the Spanish army in the 16th–17th centuries contributed rather to the economic collapse of Spain and to the weakness of the central government against regional rebellions while Simon Adams has put in question if there was any growth at all in the first half of the 17th century. The growth is however clear in the second half of the 17th century, when the States embrace the task of recruiting and arming themselves their armies, abandoning the system of commission, prevalent until the end of the Thirty Years' War. The organization of a system of Local and Provincial Militias around this period in several countries (and the growing importance of Local Aristocracy, the so-called "refeudalization of the armies" especially in Eastern Europe) contributed to the extension of manpower base of the national armies, although foreign mercenaries still remained a considerable percentage in all European armies.

=== Size of field armies ===
This has been dictated through history by logistical constraints, mainly the supply of food. Before the mid-17th century, armies basically lived off the land. They didn't have supply lines; they moved to the supply, and many times their movements were dictated by supply considerations. While some regions with good communications could supply large armies for longer periods, still they had to disperse when they moved from these well supplied areas. The maximum size of field armies remained under 50,000 for most of this period, and strength reports over this figure are always from unreliable narrative sources and must be regarded with scepticism. In the second half of the 17th things changed greatly. Armies began to be supplied through a net of depots linked by supply lines, that greatly increased the size of Field Armies. In the 18th century and early 19th century, before the advent of the railway, the size of Field Armies reached figures over 100,000.

== Conclusion ==
The theory of a military revolution based upon technology has given way to models based more on a slow evolution in which technology plays a minor role to organization, command and control, logistics and in general non-material improvements. The revolutionary nature of these changes was only visible after a long evolution that handed Europe a predominant place in warfare, a place that the industrial revolution would confirm.

Some historians have begun to challenge the existence of a military revolution in the early modern period and have proposed alternative explanations. The most radical revisionist views of the theory consider it unable to explain the military developments of the Early Modern Period and the hegemonic rise of the West. The new wave of revisionist historians reject completely the idea of a military revolution and base their position on close analysis of the gradual and uneven transformation of tactical, operational, and technological aspects of European warfare over the course of the late Middle Ages and Early Modern period, as well as in their assessment of similar military experiences among non-Western countries, namely, Japan, Korea, the Mughal Empire, and the Ottoman Empire.

== Bibliography ==
- Adams, Simon (1995), "Tactics or Politics? 'The Military Revolution' and the Habsburg Hegemony, 1525–1648", in Rogers, Clifford J. (ed.), The Military Revolution Debate: Readings on the Military Transformation of Early Modern Europe, Oxford
- Ayton, A.; Price, J.L. (1995), The Medieval Military Revolution. State, Society and military change in Medieval and Early Modern Europe, London
- Barker, Thomas (1975), The Military Intellectual and Battle, Albany
- Black, Jeremy (2008), "Was There a Military Revolution in Early Modern Europe?", History Today, 58 (7): 34–41, in EBSCO
- Carey, B. (2006), Warfare in the Medieval World, London
- Chandler, David (1990), The Art of Warfare in the Age of Marlborough, New York, ISBN 978-1-885119-14-8
- Childs, John (2001), Warfare in the Seventeenth Century, London
- Contamine, Philippe (1984), War in the Middle Ages, Oxford
- Eltis, David (1995), The Military Revolution in Sixteenth Century Europe, London: I. B. Taurus, ISBN 978-1-860643-52-1
- Guthrie, William P. (2002), Battles of the Thirty Years War, From White Mountain to Nördlingen, Westport, ISBN 978-0-313-32028-6
- Guthrie, William P. (2003), The Later Thirty Years War, From the Battle of Wittstock to the Treaty of Westphalia, Westport, ISBN 978-0-313-32408-6
- Haines, Spencer (2017). "The 'Military Revolution' Arrives on the Central Eurasian Steppe: The Unique Case of the Zunghar (1676 - 1745)". Mongolica: An International Journal of Mongolian Studies. 51. International Association of Mongolists: 170–185.
- Jacob, F. & Visoni-Alonzo, G., The Military Revolution in Early Modern Europe, a Revision, Palgrave Pivot, 2016. ISBN 978-1137539175
- Lynn, John A. (1991), "Clio in arms: the role of the military variable in shaping history", Journal of Military History, vol. 55, pp. 83–95
- Lynn, John A. (1993), Feeding Mars: Logistics in Western Warfare from the Middle Ages to the Present, Boulder, ISBN 978-0-8133-1716-8
- Mortimer, Geoff (2004). Early Modern Military History, 1450-1815. Springer. p. 40-41. ISBN 978-0-2305-2398-2.
- Parker, Geoffrey (1996), The Military Revolution, 1500–1800: Military Innovation and the Rise of the West (2nd ed.)
- Parrott, David A. (2001), Richelieu's Army: War, Government and Society in France, 1624–1642, Cambridge, ISBN 978-0-521-79209-7
- Parrott, David A. (1995), "Strategy and Tactics in the Thirty Years' War"", in Rogers, Clifford J. (ed.), The Military Revolution Debate: Readings on the Military Transformation of Early Modern Europe, Oxford
- Roberts, Michael. "The Military Revolution, 1560–1660" (1956) reprinted in Clifford J Rogers, ed. (1995). The Military Revolution Debate: Readings On The Military Transformation Of Early Modern Europe. Avalon Publishing. pp. 13–36. ISBN 9780813320540.; online copy
- Roberts, Michael (1956), The Military Revolution, 1560–1660, Belfast: M. Boyd, LCCN 61038431, OCLC 4735554 reprinted with some amendments in his Essays in Swedish History (London, 1967) and Roberts (1995)
- Rogers, Clifford J. (1993), "The Military Revolutions of the Hundred Years War", The Journal of Military History, 57 (2): 258–75, doi:10.2307/2944058, JSTOR 2944058
- Rogers, Clifford J. (1995), "The Military Revolutions of the Hundred Years' War'", in Rogers, Clifford J. (ed.), The Military Revolution Debate: Readings on the Military Transformation of Early Modern Europe, Oxford
- Rogers, Clifford J. (1995). The Military Revolution Debate: Readings On The Military Transformation Of Early Modern Europe. Avalon Publishing. ISBN 9780813320540.
- Thompson, I.A.A. (1976), War and government in Habsburg. Spain: 1560–1620, London, ISBN 0485111667
- Verbruggen, J. F. (1997), The Art of Warfare in Western Europe During the Middle Ages from the Eighth Century to 1340 (2nd ed.)
