= Derek Croxton =

American academic specialized in history

- Born: Charles Derek Croxton; January 2, 1969 (age 57); Fairfax, Virginia, US
- Spouse: Tanya Croxton (m. 1991)

Scholarly background
- Education: University of Virginia; University of Illinois Urbana-Champaign
- Thesis: Peacemaking in Early Modern Europe (1996)
- Doctoral advisor: Geoffrey Parker

Scholarly work
- Discipline: History
- Sub-discipline: European history
- Main interests: Thirty Years' War

Charles Derek Croxton (born 1969) is an American historian. He authored several articles on military and diplomatic aspects of the Thirty Years' War. Croxton wrote Peacemaking in Early Modern Europe: Cardinal Mazarin and The Congress of Westphalia, 1643–1648. He also worked as adjunct professor at Madonna College and has taught at Ohio State University and at Columbus State Community College.

Alongside Anuschka Tischer, he wrote The Peace of Westphalia: A Historical Dictionary. Most recently, he was the author of Westphalia: The Last Christian Peace.

Derek is also a game designer, having designed The King's Coalition (Play To Z games), Rommel's War, and Archie's War, the latter two by Worthington Publishing.
