= Heritage studies =

Academic discipline concerned with cultural heritage

Heritage studies looks at the relationship between people and tangible and intangible heritage through the use of social science research methods. The publication of the book by David Lowenthal, The Past is a Foreign Country, in 1985 is credited with establishing the field. The emergence of a significant cultural heritage discourse with a strong interdisciplinary flavor can also be seen as one of the unexpected impacts of the World Heritage Convention.

While related to the disciplines of history, heritage conservation, and historic preservation, heritage studies is not necessarily concerned with the objective representation of the past. History is "the raw facts of the past" while heritage is "history processed through mythology, ideology, nationalism, local pride, romantic ideas or just plain marketing". The meanings of heritage are therefore subjective and rooted in the present; these meanings are defined by social, cultural, and individual processes. In other words, the meanings of heritage can be understood through contemporary sociocultural and experiential values. Lowenthal argues that in the realm of human experience, we create heritage; to most people, heritage is therefore more important than history and is a product of human invention and creativity.

== Journals ==
Notable journals in the field of heritage studies include:

- International Journal of Heritage Studies
- Heritage & Society
- International Journal of Intangible Heritage

== See also ==
- Heritage science

== Bibliography ==
- Gentry, K., and Smith, L. 2019. "Critical Heritage Studies and the Legacies of the Late-twentieth Century Heritage Canon." International Journal of Heritage Studies 25 (11): 1148–1168. https://doi.org/10.1080/13527258.2019.1570964
- Harrison, R. 2013. Heritage: Critical Approaches. New York, Oxon: Routledge. https://doi.org/10.4324/9780203108857.
- King, R., and Rico, T. (eds.) 2024. Methods and Methodologies in Heritage Studies. London: UCL Press. https://doi.org/10.14324/111.9781800083790.
- Lowenthal, D. 1985. The Past is a Foreign Country. Cambridge, UK: Cambridge University Press.
- Smith, L. 2006. Uses of Heritage. London: Routledge. https://doi.org/10.4324/9780203602263.
- Sørensen, M. L. S., and Carman, J. (eds.) 2009. Heritage Studies: Methods and Approaches. London: Routledge. https://doi.org/10.4324/9780203871713.
- Winter, T. 2013. "Clarifying the Critical in Critical Heritage Studies." International Journal of Heritage Studies 19 (6): 532–545. https://doi.org/10.1080/13527258.2012.720997
