= David Abulafia =

English historian (1949–2026)

Professor David Abulafia CBE FSA FRHistS FBA
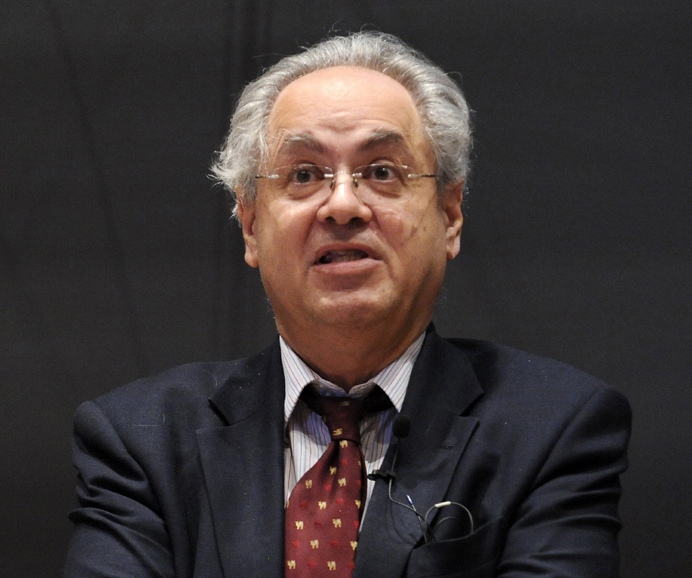
- Abulafia in 2010
- Born: David Samuel Harvard Abulafia; 12 December 1949; Twickenham, Middlesex, England
- Died: 24 January 2026 (aged 76); Cambridge, England
- Spouse: Anna Brechta Sapir (m. 1979)
- Children: 2

Academic background
- Education: King's College, Cambridge
- Doctoral advisor: R. C. Smail

Academic work
- Discipline: History
- Institutions: Gonville and Caius College, Cambridge
- Notable works: The Great Sea (2011); The Boundless Sea (2019)

David Samuel Harvard Abulafia CBE FSA FRHistS FBA (12 December 1949 – 24 January 2026) was an English historian with a particular interest in Italy, Spain and the rest of the Mediterranean during the Middle Ages and Renaissance. He spent most of his career at the University of Cambridge, rising to become a professor at the age of 50. He retired in 2017 as Professor Emeritus of Mediterranean History. He was a Fellow of Gonville and Caius College, Cambridge. He was Chairman of the History Faculty at Cambridge University, 2003–2005, and was elected a member of the governing Council of Cambridge University in 2008. He was visiting Beacon Professor at the new University of Gibraltar, where he also served on the Academic Board. He was a visiting professor at the College of Europe (Natolin branch, Poland).

Abulafia was a Fellow of the British Academy and a member of the Academia Europaea. In 2013 he was awarded one of three inaugural British Academy Medals for his work on Mediterranean history. In 2020, he was awarded the Wolfson History Prize for The Boundless Sea: A Human History of the Oceans. His death was announced on 25 January 2026.

== Early life and education ==
Abulafia was born in Twickenham, Middlesex, the son of Leon Abulafia and his wife Rachel, née Zafransky. His father was a Sephardic Jew whose ancestors had migrated to Galilee from Spain after the expulsion of the Jews in 1492 and lived for generations in Tiberias. David’s paternal grandparents, both from Jewish merchant families, met in Morocco. He was educated at St. Paul's School and read history at King's College, Cambridge.

== Academic career ==
Abulafia published several books on Mediterranean history, beginning with his book The Two Italies in 1977. In this work, he argued that as far back as the twelfth century northern Italy exploited the agricultural resources of the Italian south, and that this provided the essential basis for the further expansion of trade and industry in Tuscany, Genoa and Venice. He edited volume 5 of the New Cambridge Medieval History and the volume on Italy in the central Middle Ages in the Oxford Short History of Italy; he also edited an important collection of studies of the French invasion of Italy in 1494–1495 as well as a book on The Mediterranean in History which has appeared in six languages. He has given lectures in many countries including Italy, Spain, Portugal, France, Germany, Finland, Norway, the United States, Dominican Republic, Japan, China, Israel, the United Arab Emirates, Jordan, and Egypt.

One of his most influential books is Frederick II: A Medieval Emperor, first published in England in 1988 and reprinted many times in several Italian editions. Here he looked at an iconic figure from the Middle Ages from a new perspective, criticizing the views of the famous German historian Ernst Kantorowicz concerning Frederick II of Hohenstaufen, whom Abulafia saw as a conservative figure rather than as a genius born out of his time.

He was appointed Order of the Star of Italian Solidarity by the President of Italy in recognition of his writing on Italian history, especially Sicilian history, and he also wrote about Spain, particularly the Balearic Islands. He showed an interest in the economic history of the Mediterranean, and in the meeting of the three Abrahamic faiths in the Mediterranean. Not confining himself to the Mediterranean, he also wrote a much-praised book on the first encounters between western Europeans and the native societies of the Atlantic (the Canary islands, the Caribbean and Brazil) around 1492; this book is The Discovery of Mankind: Atlantic Encounters in the Age of Columbus (2008).

In 2011, Penguin Books (and Oxford University Press in New York) published his The Great Sea: A Human History of the Mediterranean, a substantial volume that sets out a different approach to Mediterranean history to that propounded by the French historian Fernand Braudel, and ranges in time from 22,000 BC to AD 2010. The book, which received the Mountbatten Literary Award from the Maritime Foundation, became a bestseller in UK non-fiction and was widely acclaimed. It has been translated into Dutch, French, Greek, Turkish, Spanish, German, Arabic, Italian, Korean, Chinese, Romanian and Portuguese, with further translations under contract.

Abulafia wrote The Boundless Sea: A Human History of the Oceans, published by Penguin in the UK and by Oxford University Press in the US in October 2019. This book applies a similar method to his history of the Mediterranean, looking at the people who moved across the open sea, and emphasizing the role of maritime trade in the political, cultural and economic history of humanity. It won the Wolfson History Prize and the Mountbatten Award in 2020.

He was appointed Commander of the Order of the British Empire (CBE) in the 2023 Birthday Honours for services to scholarship.

== Commentary ==
In retirement, Abulafia was a regular commentator for the Daily Telegraph and the Spectator. He participated in the British culture wars from a right-wing perspective, criticising for example the removal of statues of people associated with slavery, and other aspects of what he considered wokery.

He also criticised the UK's membership in the European Union, accusing the idea of European unity of being based upon "historical determinism". He was the chairman of Historians for Britain, a pro-Brexit organisation. According to Abulafia, the process of European integration is "a myth used to silence other visions of European community".

In 2023 he wrote that "it would be uncivilised to give Greece the Elgin Marbles", considering that they belong "in London, in a great universal museum, not in the narrow confines of Athens's Acropolis".

In 2024, he criticised the BBC's use of colour-blind casting in the historical drama miniseries King & Conqueror, which depicts the 1066 Norman Conquest of England. The series features a racially diverse cast, including black actors in roles such as the Anglo-Saxon nobleman Morcar.

== Personal life and death ==
In 1979, Abulafia married Anna Brechta Sapir, with whom he had two daughters.

He died on 24 January 2026, at the age of 76.

== Interviews ==
- "Humanity and the Great Seas: Conversation with David Abulafia", Hansong Li. Chicago Journal of History, Issue VII, Autumn 2016.
- "Migration, Media and Intercultural Dialogue 2: Migration and Culture in the Mediterranean" The United Nations University Institute on Globalization, Culture and Mobility.

== Main works ==
- The Two Italies: Economic Relations between the Norman Kingdom of Sicily and the Northern Communes, Cambridge 1977
- Frederick II: A Medieval Emperor, London 1988
- A Mediterranean Emporium: The Catalan Kingdom of Majorca, Cambridge 1994
- The Western Mediterranean Kingdoms, 1200–1500: The Struggle for Dominion, London 1997
- The Discovery of Mankind: Atlantic Encounters in the Age of Columbus, New Haven, CT 2008
- The Great Sea: A Human History of the Mediterranean, Oxford 2011
- The Boundless Sea: A Human History of the Oceans, London 2019
