= Robert Dodgshon =

Geographer

Robert Dodgshon FLSW FBA is a British academic specialising in geography. He has been Emeritus Professor of Geography at Aberystwyth University since 2008.

== Career ==
Attended Alsop High School, Liverpool, 1953-60. After graduating from Liverpool University with a BA and then a PhD, Dodgshon became professor of geography in 1988 at Aberystwyth University, eighteen years after being appointed in 1970. He also held the posts of Director of the Institute of Geography and Earth Sciences (1998–2003) and Gregynog Professor of Human Geography (2000–2007) at Aberystwyth University. He is currently serving as an Emeritus Professor of Geography at Aberystwyth University, a post he has held since 2008.

As well as having worked as a professor of geography, Dodgshon has worked in nature conservation, having been the President of the Society for Landscape Studies from 1998 to 2008. During this time, he was also a council member of National Trust for England and Wales from 2000 to 2008, and a council member of the Countryside Council for Wales from 1997 to 2004.

Dodgshon's primary research interests have been in historical and cultural geography, and he has worked on the history of rural communities and their economy in the Scottish Highlands and Islands; he has written a book about this research.

== Honours and awards ==
- Murchison Award from the RGS
- Scottish Geographical Medal from the RSGS
- Elected Fellow of the British Academy in 2002
- Founding Fellow of the Learned Society of Wales 2010

== Selected works ==
- Dodgshon, Robert (1998). Society in Time and Space: a Geographical Perspective on Change. Cambridge: Cambridge University Press. ISBN 978-0-52159-385-9
- Dodgshon, Robert (2015). No Stone Unturned: A History of Farming, Landscape and Environment in the Scottish Highlands and Islands. Edinburgh: Edinburgh University Press. ISBN 978-1-4744-0351-1
- Dodgshon, Robert (1998). From Chiefs to Landlords: Social and Economic Change in the Western Highlands and Islands, c. 1493–1820. Edinburgh: Edinburgh University Press. ISBN 978-0-7486-1034-1
- Dodgshon, Robert; Butler, Robin (eds) (2013). Historical Geography of England and Wales. London; Academic Press Limited. ISBN 978-0-12219-254-0
- Dodgshon, R 2019, Farming Communities in the Western Alps, 1500–1914: the Enduring Bond. Historical Geography and Geosciences, Springer Nature. doi:10.1007/978-3-030-16361-7
