= Anuschka Tischer =

German historian (born 1968)

Anuschka Tischer (born 30 July 1968 in Arnsberg, Germany) is a historian at the University of Würzburg. She has been a Robert Bosch Foundation Lecturer for History at the University of Latvia in Riga, and a scientific assistant at the Philipps-Universität in Marburg. A former research fellow for the edition series Acta Pacis Wesphalicae, she has published works on French diplomacy at the Congress of Westphalia and is currently doing work on the Franco-Spanish War of the 1650s.

Tischer earned her M.A. degree on 1992 with her work Magisterarbeit zu den Reformbestrebungen Kaiser Maximilians I. in Heerwesen und Kriegsorganisation des Reichs [Master's thesis on Emperor Maximilian I's attempts to reform the army and military organization of the empire]. She obtained her PhD in 1998 with her Dissertation zum außenpolitischen Wandel von Richelieu zu Mazarin am Beispiel der französischen Diplomatie beim Westfälischen Frieden [Dissertation on the change in foreign policy from Richelieu to Mazarin using the example of French diplomacy at the Peace of Westphalia]. She also wrote Französische Diplomatie und Diplomaten auf dem Westfälischen Friedenskongreß. Außenpolitik unter Richelieu und Mazarin [French diplomacy and diplomats at the peace congress of Westphalia: foreign policy under Richelieu and Mazarin], published in 1999.

Alongside Derek Croxton, she wrote the critically acclaimed The Peace of Westphalia: A Historical Dictionary.
