= R. F. Foster (historian) =

Irish historian (born 1949)

R. F. Foster FBA FRHistS FRSL
- Born: Robert Fitzroy Foster; 16 January 1949 (age 77); Waterford, Ireland
- Occupations: Historian and academic
- Spouse: Aisling O'Conor Donelan (m. 1972)
- Children: 2
- Awards: James Tait Black Memorial Prize (1997); British Academy Medal (2015)

Academic background
- Education: Newtown School; St. Andrew's School
- Alma mater: Trinity College Dublin

Academic work
- Discipline: History
- Sub-discipline: History of Ireland (1801-1923); Political history; Irish literature
- Institutions: Birkbeck, University of London; Hertford College, Oxford

Robert Fitzroy Foster FBA FRHistS FRSL (born 16 January 1949), publishing as R. F. Foster, is an Irish historian and academic. He was the Carroll Professor of Irish History from 1991 until 2016 at Hertford College, Oxford.

== Early life ==
Foster was born on 16 January 1949 in Waterford, to two teachers: Betty Foster (née Fitzroy), a primary teacher, and 'Fef' (Frederick) Ernest Foster, a teacher of Irish. His father, Fef, was a native of Drung, a tiny hamlet and parish located between Cavan Town and Cootehill in County Cavan where Roy's grandfather Frederick Foster signed the Ulster Covenant in 1912. Roy attended Newtown School in Waterford, a multi-denominational school that was founded as a Quaker school in 1798. He won a scholarship to attend St. Andrew's School in Delaware for a year before reading history at Trinity College Dublin. He was awarded an M.A. and PhD by Trinity College, where he was taught by T. W. Moody and F. S. L. Lyons, and was elected a scholar in History and Political Science in 1969.

== Academic career ==
Prior to his appointment to the Carroll professorship, he was Professor of Modern British History at Birkbeck College, University of London, and held visiting fellowships at St Antony's College, Oxford, the Institute for Advanced Study, Princeton, and Princeton University. Based in London as well as at Hertford College in Oxford, Foster visits Ireland frequently. His work is generally published under the name R. F. Foster.

He has written early biographies of Charles Stewart Parnell and Lord Randolph Churchill, edited The Oxford History of Ireland (1989), and written Modern Ireland: 1600–1972 (1988) and several books of essays. He collaborated with Fintan Cullen on a National Portrait Gallery exhibition, Conquering England: the Irish in Victorian London. Foster produced a much-acclaimed two-part biography of W. B. Yeats, which was awarded the James Tait Black Memorial Prize. Seamus Deane wrote a review of the biography in which he quoted the last line of Yeats' poem The Municipal Gallery Revisited: "My glory was that I had such friends", and stated that Yeats was also lucky to have Foster as his biographer.

In 2000, Foster was a Booker Prize judge.

== Personal life ==
He has been married to the novelist and critic Aisling Foster (née O'Conor Donelan) since 1972; the couple have two children.

== Honours ==
In 1989, he was elected Fellow of the British Academy (FBA) and in 2010 he was elected an Honorary Member of the Royal Irish Academy (Hon. MRIA). He is also an elected Fellow of the Royal Society of Literature (FRSL), and a Fellow of the Royal Historical Society (FRHistS).

He gave the 2006 Warton Lecture on English Poetry. In 2015, he was awarded the British Academy Medal for his book Vivid Faces: The Revolutionary Generation in Ireland 1890–1923.

In 2017, he was made an honorary fellow of Trinity College Dublin.

In 2021 Foster was awarded an Irish Presidential Distinguished Service Award in Arts, Culture & Sport.

Foster received the Lifetime Achievement Award as one of the Irish Book Awards in November 2023.

== Works ==
- Charles Stewart Parnell: The Man and His Family (Sussex: Harvester Wheatsheaf 1976; NJ: Humanities Press 1979)
- ‘To The Northern Counties Station: Lord Randolph Churchill and the Prelude to the Orange Card’, in F. S. L. Lyons & R. A. J. Hawkins, ed., Ireland Under the Union: Varieties of Tension: Essays in Honour of T. W. Moody (Oxford Clarendon Press 1980)
- Lord Randolph Churchill: A Political Life (Oxford: OUP 1981)
- Modern Ireland 1600–1972 (London: Allen Lane; NY Viking/Penguin 1988) [with introductory essay on 'Varieties of Irishness']
- ed., The Oxford Illustrated History of Modern Ireland (OUP 1989; [rev. edn. as] The Oxford History of Ireland, OUP 1992)
- W. B. Yeats, A Life, Vol. I: The Apprentice Mage, 1865–1914 (OUP March 1997)
- The Irish Story: Telling Tales and Making It Up in Ireland (London: Allen Lane/Penguin Press 2001)
- W. B. Yeats – A Life, II: The Arch-Poet 1915–1939 (Oxford: OUP 2003)
- Luck and the Irish: A Brief History of Change from 1970 (Oxford: OUP 2008)
- Vivid Faces: The Revolutionary Generation in Ireland, 1890–1923 (NY: W. W. Norton & Company; 2015)
- On Seamus Heaney (Princeton University Press 2020)

Essay collections

- Paddy and Mr Punch: Connections in Irish History and English History (London: Allen Lane/Penguin 1993; rep. 1995)
- The Irish Story: Telling Tales and Making It Up in Ireland (London: Allen Lane/Penguin Press 2001)

Miscellaneous

- Political Novels and Nineteenth-Century History (Winchester: King Alfred's College 1982)
- ed., Hubert Butler, The Sub-Prefect Should Have Held His Tongue (Dublin: Lilliput Press 1990; rep. London: Penguin 1992), and Do., in French trans. as L’Envahisseur est venu en pantoufles (1995)
- The Story of Ireland: an Inaugural Lecture delivered before the University of Oxford on 1 December 1994 (Oxford: Clarendon Press 1995)
