= Antony Griffiths =

British museum curator (born 1951)

Antony Griffiths FBA
- Born: 28 July 1951 (age 75)
- Awards: British Academy Medal (2017)

Academic background
- Education: Christ Church, Oxford; Courtauld Institute of Art

Academic work
- Discipline: Art historian
- Sub-discipline: Old master print
- Institutions: British Museum

Antony Vaughan Griffiths, FBA (born 28 July 1951) is a British museum curator and art historian, specialising in prints and drawings. From 1991 to 2011, he served as Keeper of the Department of Prints and Drawings, British Museum. He was Slade Professor of Fine Art at the University of Oxford for the 2014/2015 academic year.

== Early life and education ==
Griffiths was born on 28 July 1951. He was educated at Highgate School, then an all-boys private school in Highgate, London. He studied Classics ("Greats") at Christ Church, Oxford, graduating with a Bachelor of Arts (BA) degree, and art history at the Courtauld Institute of Art, University of London, graduating with a Master of Arts (MA) degree.

== Career ==
Griffiths joined the British Museum's Department of Prints and Drawings as an Assistant Keeper in 1976. He was promoted to Deputy Keeper of the department in 1981, and appointed its Keeper in 1991. After 20 years leading the department, he retired from the British Museum in 2011.

Griffiths was selected to give the Panizzi Lectures at the British Library for 2003: the lecture series was titled "Prints for Books, French Book Illustration 1760–1800". He was the Slade Professor of Fine Art at the University of Oxford for the 2014/2015 academic year. As such, he was required to give a lecture series consisting of eight lectures: the series was titled "The Print before Photography: The European print in the age of the copper plate and wooden block" (published in book form, 2016).

Griffiths has been Chairman of Print Quarterly Publications since 2001. He co-founded the academic journal Print Quarterly in 1984, which is published by Print Quarterly Publications, and is a serving member of its editorial board. He was a trustee of the Art Fund from 2010 to 2021. From 2013 to 2022, he served as chairman of The Walpole Society. He has been a trustee of the Henry Moore Foundation since 2014.

== Honours ==
In 2000, Griffiths was elected a Fellow of the British Academy, the United Kingdom's national academy for the humanities and social sciences.

On 27 September 2017, Griffiths was awarded the British Academy Medal for his book The Print Before Photography: An Introduction to European Printmaking 1550–1820.

== Selected works ==
- Griffiths, Antony (1980). Prints and printmaking (1st ed.). London: British Museum Publications. ISBN 978-0714107707.
- Griffiths, Antony (1996). Prints and printmaking: an introduction to the history and techniques (2nd ed.). London: British Museum Press for the Trustees of the British Museum. ISBN 978-0714126081.
- Griffiths, Antony; Carey, Frances (1994). German printmaking: in the age of Goethe. London: British Museum Press. ISBN 0714116599.
- Griffiths, Antony, ed. (1996). Landmarks in Print Collecting: Connoisseurs and Donors at the British Museum Since 1753. London: British Museum Press and the Parnassus Foundation. ISBN 978-0714126098.
- Griffiths, Antony; Hartley, Craig (1997). Jacques Bellange c.1575-1616: printmaker of Lorraine. London: British Museum Press for the British Museum. ISBN 071412611X.
- Griffiths, Antony (1998). The print in Stuart Britain, 1603-1689. London: British Museum. ISBN 978-0714126074.
- Griffiths, Antony (2004). Prints for books: book illustration in France, 1760-1800. London: British Library. ISBN 978-0712348744.
- Griffiths, Antony (2016). The Print Before Photography: An introduction to European Printmaking 1550-1820. London: British Museum Press. ISBN 978-0714126951.
