= Susan E. Kelly =

British medievalist

Susan Elisabeth Kelly is a British medievalist.

== Early life and education ==
Kelly attended Clare College, Cambridge, from 1979 to 1985, graduating with a Bachelor of Arts degree in 1982 and a Doctor of Philosophy degree in 1987. Her doctorate was awarded for her thesis "The Pre-Conquest History and Archive of St Augustine's Abbey, Canterbury".

== Career ==
From 1985 to 1988, Kelly was a Rank Foundation Research Fellow at St Catherine's College, Oxford. She was then a British Academy Research Fellow at St Catherine's from 1988 to 1991. From 1991 to 1996, she was a researcher in the Department of Anglo-Saxon, Norse and Celtic at the University of Cambridge, before working as a research fellow at the University of Birmingham from 1996 to 1997 and from 1998 to 2012. In the meantime, she was principal editor (from 1998 to 2011) of the British Academy's Anglo-Saxon Charters series; she has authored or co-authored fourteen volumes of charters for the series. She has been a Marc Fitch Senior Research Fellow at the University of East Anglia since 2015. In 2016, she received the President's Medal from the British Academy, the United Kingdom's national academy for the humanities and social sciences; awarded to up to three people annually, the medal recognises "outstanding service to the cause of the humanities and social sciences".

== Publications ==
- "Anglo-Saxon Lay Society and the Written Word", in Rosamond McKitterick (ed.), The Uses of Literacy in Early Medieval Europe (Cambridge: Cambridge University Press, 1990), pp. 36–62.
- "Trading Privileges from Eighth-Century England", Early Medieval Europe, vol. 1, no. 1 (1992), pp. 3–28. doi:10.1111/j.1468-0254.1992.tb00002.x
- Charters of St Augustine's Abbey, Canterbury, and Minister-in-Thanet, Anglo-Saxon Charters, no. 4 (Oxford: Oxford University Press for the British Academy, 1995).
- Charters of Shaftesbury Abbey, Anglo-Saxon Charters, no. 5 (Oxford: Oxford University Press for the British Academy, 1996).
- Charters of Selsey, Anglo-Saxon Charters, no. 6 (Oxford: Oxford University Press for the British Academy, 1998).
- "Some Forgeries in the Archive of St Augustine's Abbey, Canterbury", in Fälschungen im Mittelalter. Teil IV: Diplomatische Fälschungen Monumenta Germaniae Historica Schriften, vol. 33, no. 4, pp. 347–69.
- Charters of Abingdon Abbey: Part 1, Anglo-Saxon Charters, no. 7 (Oxford: Oxford University Press for the British Academy, 2000).
- Charters of Abingdon Abbey: Part 2, Anglo-Saxon Charters, no. 8 (Oxford: Oxford University Press for the British Academy, 2001).
- Charters of St Paul's, London, Anglo-Saxon Charters, no. 10 (Oxford: Oxford University Press for the British Academy, 2004).
- Charters of Malmsbury Abbey, Anglo-Saxon Charters, no. 11 (Oxford: Oxford University Press for the British Academy, 2006).
- "Lyminge Minster and Its Early Charters" in Simon D. Keynes and Alfred P. Smyth (eds), Anglo-Saxons: Studies presented to Cyril Roy Hart (Dublin: Four Courts Press, 2006), pp. 98–113.
- Charters of Bath and Wells, Anglo-Saxon Charters, no. 13 (Oxford: Oxford University Press for the British Academy, 2007).
- "Reculver Minster and Its Early Charters", in J. Barrow and A. Wareham (eds.), Myth, Rulership, Church and Charters: Essays in Honour of Nicholas Brooks (Aldershot: Ashgate, 2008), pp. 67–82.
- "An Early Minister at Eynsham, Oxfordshire", in O. J. Padel and D. Parsons (eds), A Commodity of Good Names: Essays in Honour of Margaret Gelling (Donnington: Shaun Tyas, 2008), pp. 79–86.
- "King Æthelwulf’s Decimations", Anglo Saxon, vol. 1, pp. 285–317.
- Charters of Peterborough Abbey, Anglo-Saxon Charters, no. 14 (Oxford: Oxford University Press for the British Academy, 2009).
- Charters of Glastonbury Abbey, Anglo-Saxon Charters, no. 15 (Oxford: Oxford University Press for the British Academy, 2012).
- (with N. P. Brooks) Charters of Christ Church, Canterbury: Part 1, Anglo-Saxon Charters, no. 17 (Oxford: Oxford University Press for the British Academy, 2013).
- (with N. P. Brooks) Charters of Christ Church, Canterbury: Part 2, Anglo-Saxon Charters, no. 18 (Oxford: Oxford University Press for the British Academy, 2013).
- Charters of Chertsey Abbey, Anglo-Saxon Charters, no. 19 (Oxford: Oxford University Press for the British Academy, 2015).
- Charters of Barking Abbey and Waltham Holy Cross, Anglo-Saxon Charters, no. 20 (Oxford: Oxford University Press for the British Academy, 2021).
- "Worcester's Own History: an Account of the Foundation of the See and a Summary of Benefactions, AD 680-1093", in Francesca Tinti and D. A. Woodman (eds), Constructing History Across the Norman Conquest: Worcester c. 1050–c.1150 (Woodbridge: Boydell and Brewer, 2022), pp. 121–149.
