= Patricia Clavin =

British historian and academic

Professor Patricia Clavin FRHistS FBA
- Born: Patricia Meria Clavin; 6 January 1964 (age 62)
- Title: Professor of Modern History
- Awards: Fellow of the Royal Historical Society; British Academy Medal (2015); Fellow of the British Academy (2016)

Academic background
- Education: King's College London

Academic work
- Discipline: History
- Sub-discipline: International relations 20th century history
- Institutions: Keele University; Jesus College, Oxford; Worcester College, Oxford; University of Oxford

Patricia Meria Clavin, FRHistS, FBA (born 6 January 1964) is a British-Irish historian and academic, who specialises in international relations, economic crises, and twentieth-century history. She is Professor of Modern History at the University of Oxford and a Professorial Fellow of Worcester College.

== Early life and education ==
Clavin was born in England to Irish parents and holds dual Irish and British nationalities. Clavin was raised in Germany where her Irish father was serving in the British army. She studied Modern History at King's College London, graduating with a Bachelor of Arts (BA) degree and a Doctor of Philosophy (PhD) degree.

== Academic career ==
Before moving to Oxford, Clavin was Reader in Modern History at Keele University. In October 2003, she was elected a Fellow of Jesus College, Oxford and appointed a university lecturer in modern history at the University of Oxford. In 2011, she was granted a Title of Distinction as Professor of International History.

In October 2021 Clavin was appointed to the Professorship of Modern History at Worcester College, succeeding Robert Gildea and becoming the first woman to ever hold the chair.

She is a member of the Editorial Board for Past & Present.

=== Media work ===
In November 2021, Clavin gave a public lecture at Gresham College on European security after the First World War.

In September 2023, Clavin appeared as a panelist on an episode of the BBC Radio 4 discussion series In Our Time focused on John Maynard Keynes's Economic Consequences of the Peace (1919). Keynes's book was the subject of a collection of essays Clavin co-edited, also published in 2023. Clavin's fellow panelists were Michael Cox and Margaret MacMillan.

== Political life ==
In May 2016, Clavin was one of 300 prominent historians, including Simon Schama and Niall Ferguson, who were signatories to a letter to The Guardian, telling voters that if they chose to leave the European Union on 23 June, they would be condemning Britain to irrelevance.

== Honours ==
In 2015, Clavin was awarded the British Academy Medal for her book, Securing The World Economy: The Reinvention of the League of Nations 1920-1946; the medals are awarded each year to up to three people "for landmark academic achievement in any of the humanities and social science disciplines supported by the Academy". In July 2016, she was elected a Fellow of the British Academy (FBA), the UK's national academy for the humanities and the social sciences. She is also a Fellow of the Royal Historical Society (FRHistS), and a Foreign Member of the Norwegian Academy of Science and Letters. In 2026, Clavin was elected an honorary fellow of Jesus College, Oxford, where she was a tutorial fellow from 2003 to 2021.

== Selected works ==
- Clavin, Patricia (1996). The failure of economic diplomacy: Britain, Germany, France and the United States, 1931-36. Basingstoke: Macmillan. ISBN 978-0333605301.
- Briggs, Asa; Clavin, Patricia (1997). Modern Europe: 1789-1989 (1st ed.). London: Longman. ISBN 978-0582494060.
- Clavin, Patricia (2000). The Great Depression in Europe, 1929-1939. Basingstoke: Macmillan. ISBN 978-0333606803.
- Briggs, Asa; Clavin, Patricia (2003). Modern Europe, 1789 - present (2nd ed.). London: Pearson Longman. ISBN 978-0582772601.
- Clavin, Patricia (2013). Securing the world economy: the reinvention of the League of Nations, 1920-1946. Oxford: Oxford University Press. ISBN 978-0199577934.
- Clavin, Patricia; Sluga, Glenda (2017). Internationalisms: A Twentieth-Century History. Cambridge: Cambridge University Press. ISBN 9781107062856.
- Patricia Clavin; Giancarlo Corsetti; Maurice Obstfeld; Adam Tooze, eds. (2023). Keynes's Economic Consequences of the Peace After 100 Years: Polemics and Policy. Cambridge: Cambridge University Press. ISBN 9781009407519.

== See also ==
- Economic and Financial Organization of the League of Nations
