= Laurajane Smith =

Australian heritage and museum studies scholar

Laurajane Smith FASSA (born 1962) is a Heritage and Museum Studies scholar. Among Smith's publications that examine the politics of heritage, she edited the book Uses of Heritage. She published the book Emotional Heritage: Visitor Engagement at Museums and Heritage Sites. In 2016, Smith was elected Fellow of the Academy of the Social Sciences in Australia.
