= Maritime Foundation =

Charity

The Maritime Foundation is a registered British charity that promotes maritime interests in the United Kingdom.

== History ==
In 1981, British merchant shipping interests founded two complementary organizations, the British Maritime League, a membership organization designed to raise public awareness of maritime issues in Britain, and the British Maritime Charitable Foundation for promoting and funding education and research. In 1992, the two organizations were combined to form the Maritime Foundation.

== Activities ==
The Maritime Foundation is involved in a number of activities that include a series of annual awards to broadcasters, authors, and academics. These include

- The Desmond Wettern Maritime Media Award, since 1995
- The Mountbatten Maritime Prize, since 2000
- The Maritime Film and Documentary Prize, since 2006

The Maritime Foundation also keeps the Maritime Memorial Book at All Hallows Church, Tower Hill, London for those who have died at sea. In addition, it supports the Maritime Volunteer Service and the restoration of the 1897 Nile River Gunboat Melik.
