= Ars =

Ars, ars, or ARS may refer to:

== Places ==
- Ars, Iran, a village in East Azerbaijan Province, Iran
- Ars, various communes in France:
  - Ars, Charente, in the Charente département
  - Ars, Creuse, in the Creuse département
  - Ars-en-Ré, in the Charente-Maritime département
  - Ars-Laquenexy, in the Moselle département
  - Ars-les-Favets, in the Puy-de-Dôme département
  - Ars-sur-Formans, in the Ain département
  - Ars-sur-Moselle, in the Moselle département

== Arts and entertainment ==
- Ars Technica, a technology news website owned by Condé Nast
- Ars (magazine), a cultural magazine in Montenegro
- African red slip ware, a type of Roman pottery
- Atlanta Rhythm Section, an American rock band
  - Atlanta Rhythm Section, the group's self-titled debut album
- Automatic Reaction System (ARS), in the film Virus (1980)
- Ars (film), France, 1959

== Computing and technology ==
- Active Roll Stabilization
- Airline Reservations System
- A U.S. Navy hull classification symbol: Rescue and salvage ship (ARS)
- ARS (rocket family), American Interplanetary Society, 1930s
- Audience Response System
- Automatic Route Selection (telephony)
- Automatic Route Setting, of the IECC railway signalling system

== Organizations ==
- Ars Electronica, an Austrian cultural, educational and scientific institute
- Agricultural Research Service
- Alliance for the Re-liberation of Somalia
- American Residential Services, also known as ARS/Rescue Rooter
- American Rhododendron Society
- American Rocket Society
- American Rose Society
- Ann Richards School for Young Women Leaders
- Archives of the Republic of Slovenia
- Armenian Relief Society
- Assemblea Regionale Siciliana, the Sicilian Regional Assembly

== Science ==
- Abstract rewriting system, in mathematical logic
- Acoustic resonance spectroscopy
- Acute radiation syndrome, from radiation poisoning
- ADHD Rating Scale
- Alizarin Red S
- Al-Raqad syndrome
- Autonomously replicating sequence, in yeast DNA

== Sports ==
- Sjoerd Ars (born 1984), a Dutch footballer
- ARS (bodyboard)
- American Racing Series

== Other uses ==
- Ars (slang), a derogatory term for an Israeli man of a macho subculture
- alt.religion.scientology, a discussion board for Scientology critics
- Auction rate security, a debt instrument with a long-term nominal maturity with a regularly reset interest rate
- Arizona Revised Statutes, the statutory laws in the state
- Najdi Arabic (ISO 639-3 language code: ars)
- Saudi Arabia (ITU letter code: ARS)
- Argentine peso (ISO 4217 currency code: ARS)

== See also ==
- Arse (disambiguation)
