= Ass =

Ass most commonly refers to:

- Buttocks (in informal American English)
- Donkey or ass, Equus africanus asinus
  - Any other member of the subgenus Asinus
  - Ass (insult)

Ass or ASS may also refer to:

== Art and entertainment ==
- Ass (album), 1973, by the band Badfinger
- "Ass", a 2016 song by Momus from his 2016 album Scobberlotchers
- ASS Altenburger, a German playing card manufacturer
- Agents of Secret Stuff, a 2010 action comedy film

== Science and technology ==
- ASS (car), a French car made from 1919 to 1920
- ASS (gene), a human gene that encodes for the enzyme argininosuccinate synthetase
- Ass (M), in abstract algebra, the collection of all associated primes of a module M
- Advanced SubStation Alpha (extension .ass), a file format used for subtitles
- Angle-side-side, condition in geometry that does not prove congruence of two triangles (also called SSA)
- Arsenic sulfide, the basic chemical formula AsS

== Other uses ==
- áss, one of the Æsir in Old Norse mythology
- Advisory Service for Squatters, a non-profit group based in London, UK
- Alliance of Sahel States, an intergovernmental military alliance between Mali, Niger and Burkina Faso

== See also ==
- Arse (disambiguation)
- AS (disambiguation)
- As (Roman coin), plural form asses
- Assessment (disambiguation)
- Asshole (disambiguation)
- Asse (disambiguation)
- Asso, a town and commune in Lombardy, Italy
- Feast of the Ass, a medieval Christian feast
- Jackass (disambiguation)
- Paul van Ass, Dutch field hockey coach
- Wild ass (disambiguation)
