= Ass worship =

Ass worship may refer to:

- Body worship, a submissive act pertaining to BDSM.
- Onolatry, the ancient worship of donkeys.

== See also ==
- Ass (disambiguation)
