= U75 =

U75 may refer to:

- German submarine U-75, various vessels
- Great dirhombicosidodecahedron
- Jackass Aeropark, in Amargosa Valley, Nevada
- Small nucleolar RNA SNORD75
- U75, a line of the Düsseldorf Stadtbahn
