= Arse =

Arse or ARSE may refer to:

- A Commonwealth English slang term for the buttocks or more specifically, the anus
- Arse, the name for the Iberian settlement of modern-day Sagunto
- Arse, Indonesia, a district in the South Tapanuli Regency, North Sumatra province, Sumatra, Indonesia
- River Arse, a river in the Ariège department of southern France
- ARSE, a former symbol for arylsulfatase L gene
- Animal Research – Scientific and Experimental (ARSE), a fictional animal research centre in the book The Plague Dogs

== See also ==
- Autonomous Rotorcraft Sniper System (ARSS), the U.S. army's experimental robotic weapons system
- Arses of Persia, king of Persia between 338 BC and 336 BC
- Arses (genus), a genus of monarch flycatcher birds on the island of New Guinea
- Arses (disambiguation)
- Arce (disambiguation)
- Ars (disambiguation)
- Ass (disambiguation)
