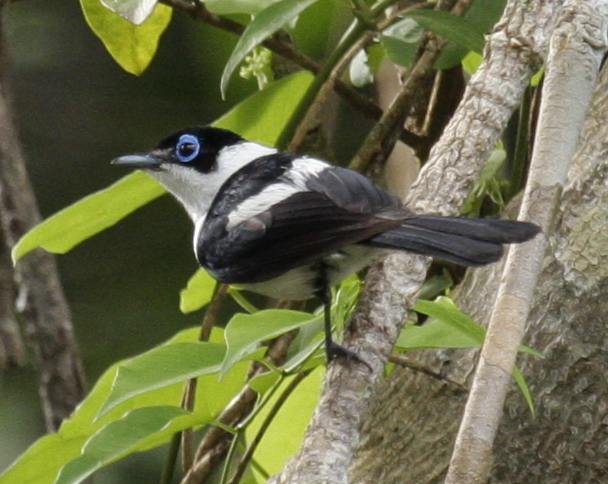

Conservation status
- Least Concern (IUCN 3.1)

Scientific classification
- Kingdom: Animalia
- Phylum: Chordata
- Class: Aves
- Order: Passeriformes
- Family: Monarchidae
- Genus: Arses
- Species: A. lorealis

Binomial name
- Arses lorealis De Vis, 1895

Synonyms
- Arses candidior Le Souëf, D. 1897; Arses telescophthalmus lorealis; Arses telescopthalmus lorealis

= Frill-necked monarch =

Species of bird

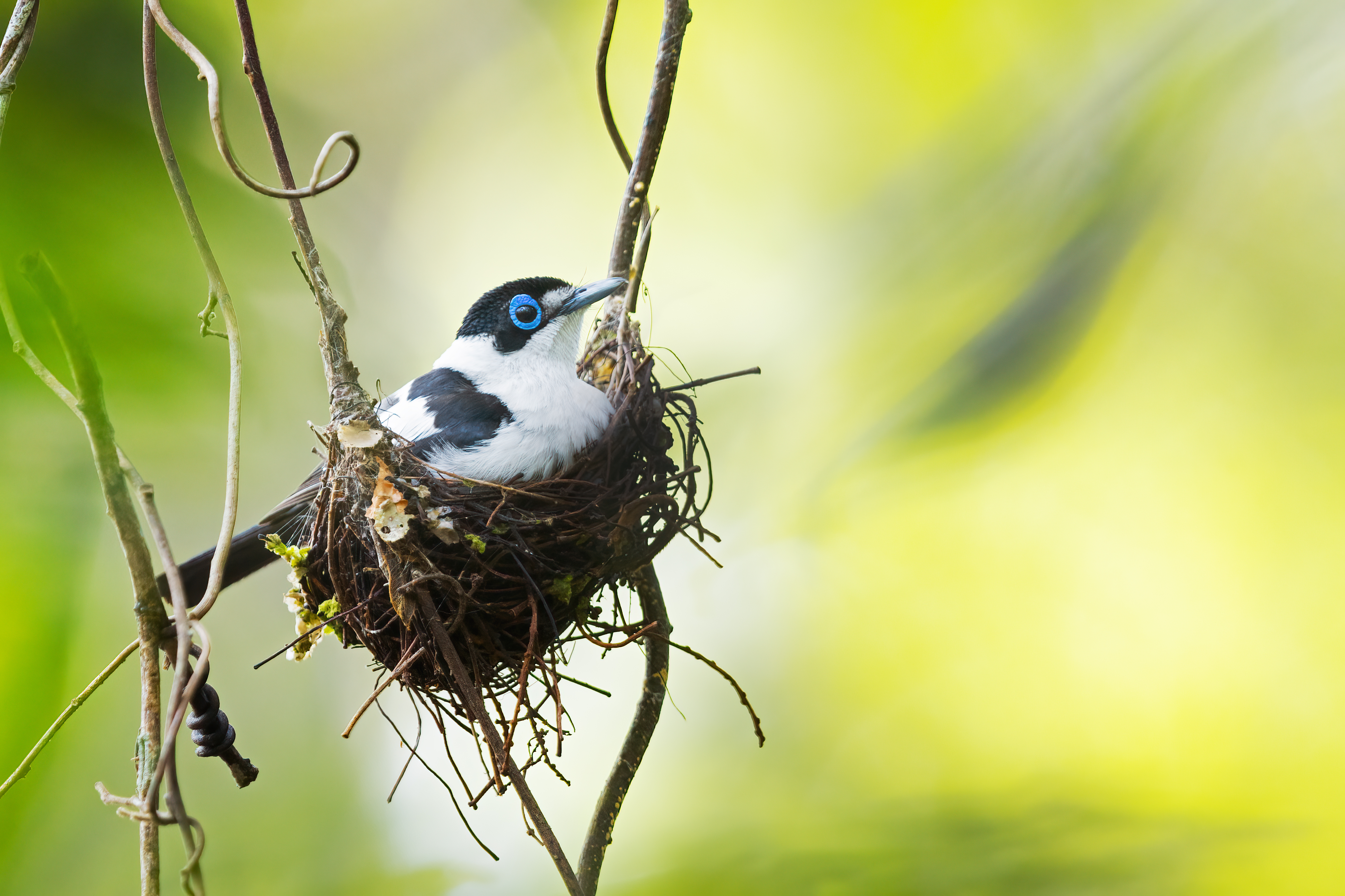

The frill-necked monarch (Arses lorealis) is a species of songbird in the family Monarchidae. It is endemic to the rainforests of the northern Cape York Peninsula in Australia.

== Taxonomy and systematics ==
The frill-necked monarch was first described in 1895 by English ornithologist and ex-clergyman Charles Walter De Vis, from a specimen collected by Kendall Broadbent that year. However, undescribed specimens had existed in the Macleay Museum in Sydney and the National Museum in Melbourne for twenty years beforehand. The first eggs were collected by H. G. Barnard the following year in Somerset, Cape York.

The frill-necked monarch is a member of a group of birds termed monarch flycatchers. This group is considered either as a subfamily Monarchinae, together with the fantails as part of the drongo family Dicruridae, or as a family Monarchidae in its own right. Molecular research in the late 1980s and early 1990s revealed the monarchs belong to a large group of mainly Australasian birds known as the Corvida parvorder comprising many tropical and Australian passerines. More recently, the grouping has been refined somewhat as the monarchs have been classified in a 'Core corvine' group with the crows and ravens, shrikes, birds of paradise, fantails, drongos and mudnest builders.

Alternative common names include the frilled-necked monarch and frill-necked flycatcher.

Some authorities consider the frill-necked monarch as a subspecies of the frilled monarch.

== Description ==
The frill-necked monarch measures around 14 cm (5.5 in) in length, and the neck feathers can become erect into a small frill; the male is predominantly black and white, and can be distinguished from the similar and more common pied monarch by its all-white breast-the latter species having a broad black breast band. The throat, nape, shoulders, and rump are white while the wings and head are black. It has an eye-ring of bare skin, and a bright blue wattle. The bill is pale blue-grey and the eyes are dark. The female is similar but has white lores and chin.

== Distribution and habitat ==
The range is from the top of Australia's Cape York Peninsula southwest to Weipa, and southeast as far as the Iron Range and Coen. Its natural habitats are tropical moist lowland forests and tropical moist montane forests.

== Breeding ==
Breeding season is November to February with one brood raised. The nest is a shallow cup made of vines and sticks, woven together with spider webs and shredded plant material, and decorated with lichen. It is generally sited on a hanging loop of vine well away from the trunk or foliage of a sizeable tree about 2–10 metres (6.6–32.8 ft) above the ground. Two pink-tinged oval white eggs splotched with lavender and reddish-brown are laid measuring 19 mm x 14 mm.
