= Alexamenos graffito =

Ancient Roman graffito, early depiction of Jesus

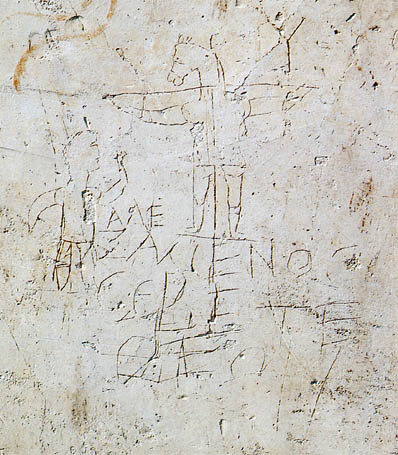
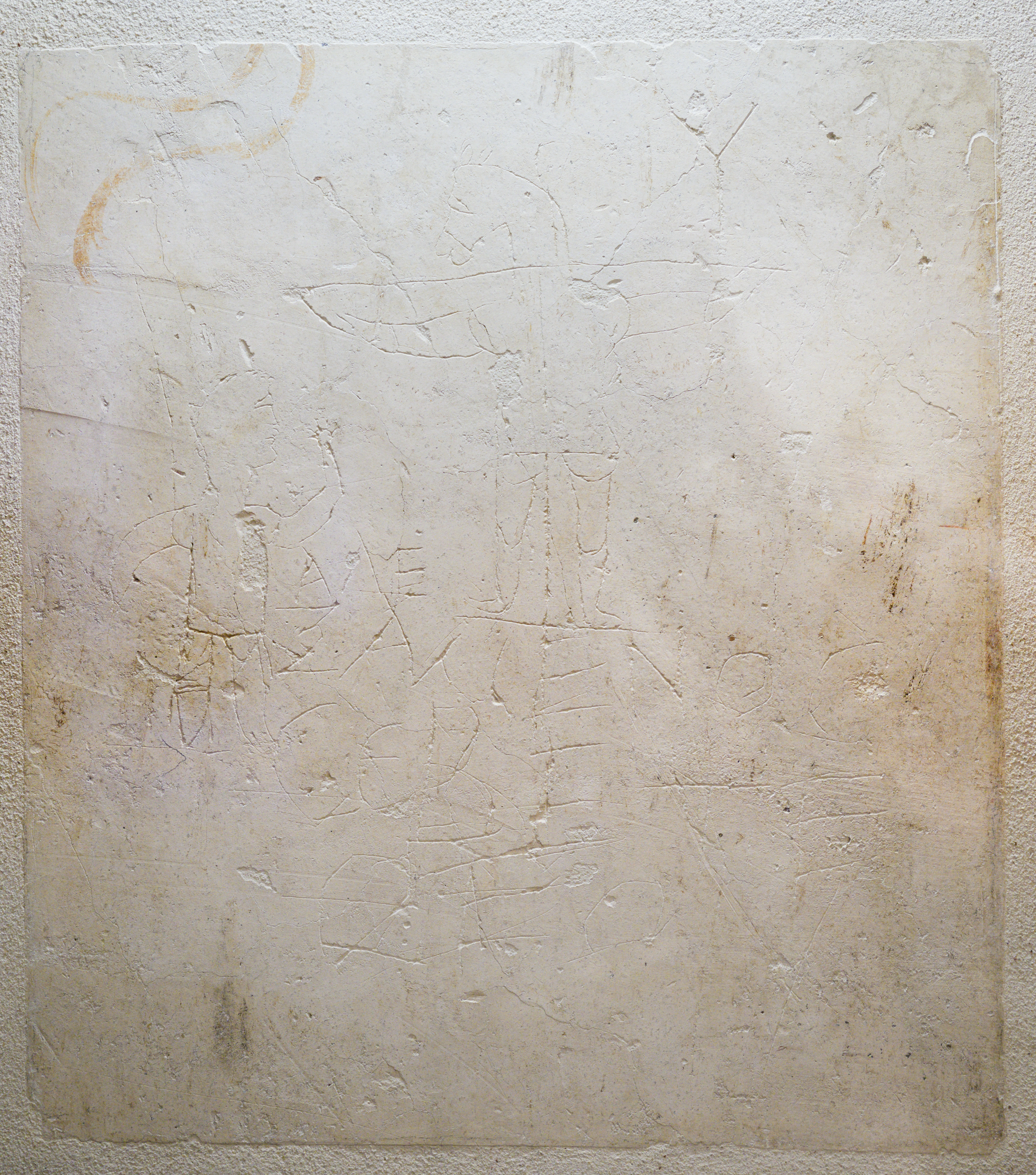
- Material: Plaster
- Writing: Ancient Greek inscription: ΑΛΕΞΑΜΕΝΟϹ ϹΕΒΕΤΕ ΘΕΟΝ ("Alexamenos worships [his] god")
- Period/culture: Between the late 2nd and early 3rd century AD
- Discovered: 1857
- Present location: Palatine Museum, Rome
- Culture: Ancient Rome

The Alexamenos graffito (Italian: graffito blasfemo, lit. 'blasphemous graffito', or graffito di Alessameno) is a piece of Roman graffiti scratched into the plaster of a wall in a room near the Palatine Hill in Rome, Italy, which has since been removed and is now located in the Palatine Museum. Often said to be the earliest depiction of Jesus, the graffito is difficult to date, but has been estimated to have been made around the year 200 AD. The image seems to show a young man worshiping a crucified, donkey-headed figure. The Ancient Greek inscription approximately translates to ''Alexamenos worships [his] god'', indicating that the graffito was apparently meant to mock a Christian named Alexamenos.

== Content ==
The image depicts a human-like figure affixed to a cross and possessing the head of a donkey or mule. In the top right of the image is what has been interpreted as either the Greek letter upsilon or a tau cross. To the left of the image is a young man – apparently intended to represent Alexamenos – as a Roman soldier or guard, raising one hand in a gesture possibly suggesting worship.

Beneath the cross is a crude caption written as "ΑΛΕΞΑΜΕΝΟϹ ϹΕΒΕΤΕ ΘΕΟΝ". The word "ϹΕΒΕΤΕ" can be understood as a variant (or a possible phonetic misspelling) of the Standard Greek word ϹΕΒΕΤΑΙ, which means ''worships''. (Note: More specifically, ϹΕΒΕΤΑΙ (σέβεται, sébetai) is the third-person present-tense singular indicative middle/passive conjugation for σέβομαι (sébomai; see Ancient Greek grammar and Koine Greek grammar), which classically means 'to feel awe or fear before God, especially when doing something disgraceful'. It also carries a more general meaning of feeling shame or religious awe. Its descendant in Modern Greek, σέβομαι (sévomai), merely means 'respect'.) The inscription would then be read as "Ἀλεξάμενος σέβεται θεόν", or ''Alexamenos worships [his] God''. Several other sources suggest ''Alexamenos worshipping a god'' or other similar variants as the intended translation.

In the next chamber, another inscription in a different hand written in both Greek and Latin reads as "ΑΛΕΞΑΜΕΝΟϹ FIDELIS" ("Alexamenos fidelis"), which either means ''Alexamenos is faithful'' or ''Alexamenos the faithful''. This may be a retort by an unknown party to the mockery of Alexamenos represented in the graffito.

== Date ==
No clear consensus has been reached on when the image was made, but a date within the later 2nd to early 3rd centuries AD is now widely accepted. Dates ranging from the late 1st century AD to the late 3rd century AD have been suggested, but with the beginning of the 3rd century AD thought to be the most likely.

== Discovery and location ==
The graffito was discovered in 1857 when a building known as the domus Gelotiana was unearthed on the Palatine Hill. The emperor Caligula had acquired the house for the imperial palace, which after Caligula died was used as a Paedagogium (boarding school) for imperial page boys. Later, the street along which the house sat was walled off to support extensions to the buildings above and thus remained sealed for centuries.

== Interpretation ==
The inscription is usually considered to be a mocking depiction of a Christian in the act of worship. The donkey's head and crucifixion would both have been considered insulting depictions by contemporary Roman society. Crucifixion continued to be used as a method of execution for the worst criminals until its abolition by the first Christian emperor Constantine I in the early 4th century AD.

It seems to have been commonly believed at the time that Christians practiced onolatry (donkey-worship). That was based on the misconception that Jews worshipped a god in the form of a donkey, a claim made by Apion (30–20 BC – c. 45-48 AD) and denied by Josephus in his work Against Apion.

Origen reports in his treatise Contra Celsum that the pagan philosopher Celsus made the same claim against Christians and Jews.

Tertullian, writing during the late 2nd or early 3rd century, reports that Christians, along with Jews, were accused of worshiping such a deity. He also mentions an apostate Jew who carried around Carthage a caricature of a Christian with a donkey's ears and hooves, labeled Deus Christianorum ὀνοκοίτης (''The God of the Christians conceived of an ass''). Marcus Minucius Felix in his Octavius, also references charges against Christians that they worshipped a donkey's head.

In the image, Alexamenos is portrayed venerating an image of the crucifix, a detail that Peter Maser believed to represent the Christian practice of venerating icons. The practice, however, was not known to be part of Christian worship until the 4th or 5th century.

According to Joan E. Taylor, Jesus in the engraving is presented as a demigod figure and compared with the Egyptian deity Set.

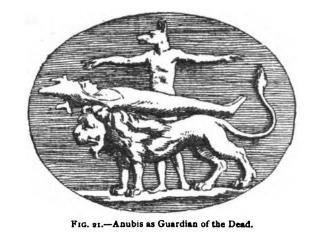
"Anubis as Guardian of the Dead" from Lundy, John Patterson (1876). Monumental Christianity New York, J.W. Bouton. p. 60.

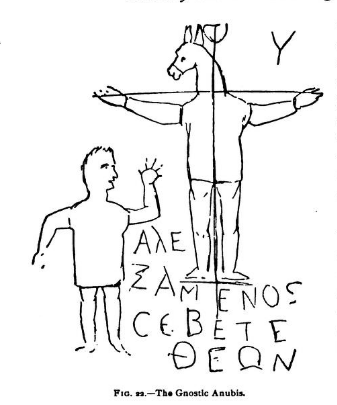
"The Gnostic Anubis" from Lundy, John Patterson (1876). Monumental Christianity New York, J.W. Bouton. p. 61.

Some scholars of the 19th century argued that the inscription is actually a depiction of the jackal-headed Egyptian god Anubis. For example, in Rev. John P. Lundy's book on early Christian history published in 1876, it identifies the inscription as the "Gnostic Anubis." He writes that the inscription depicts the "head of Anubis, or Thoth, the Egyptian Mercury and custodian of the dead". 19th-century scholar Charles William King says it is disputed whether it is a caricature of a Christian convert or an adoration of the jackal-headed god Anubis. Against the consensus, Issac Soon argues that the graffiti was a form of ancient self-parody and is Christian in origin being created by Alexamenos himself.

== See also ==
- Anti-Christian sentiment
- Yaldabaoth § Historical origins
