= Arce (surname) =

Arce or Arze is a Spanish and also Basque surname but may also refer to the given name popular in the Levant. Arzé or Arza is a feminine given name primarily in the Semitic languages, and popular in Lebanon as it means cedar of Lebanon while the male version of the name is Arz.

Notable people with the surname include:

- Aniceto Arce (1824–1906), 22nd President of Bolivia
- Ayana Holloway Arce, American physicist
- Carlos Arce (footballer, born 1985), Argentine right-back
- Carlos Arce (footballer, born 1990), Argentine midfielder
- Damián Arce (born 1991), Argentine footballer
- Eduardo Arze Quiroga (1907–1989), Bolivian diplomat
- Eleutherius of Rocca d'Arce, saint
- Fernando Arce (born 1980), Mexican footballer
- Francisco Arce (1821–1878), Mexican soldier in Alta California (see Rancho Santa Ysabel (Arce))
- Francisco Arce (born 1971), Paraguayan footballer
- Gaspar Núñez de Arce (1834–1903), Spanish writer and statesman
- Gregorio Vasquez de Arce y Ceballos (1639–1711), Colombian painter
- Ignacio Arce (born 1992), Argentine footballer
- José Arce (1881–1968), Argentine physician, politician and diplomat
- Juan Bautista Avalle-Arce (1927–2009), Argentine historian
- Juan Carlos Arce (born 1985), Bolivian footballer
- Líber Arce (1938–1968), martyred Uruguayan student activist
- Luis Arce (born 1963), 67th President of Bolivia
- Manuel José Arce (1787–1847), Salvadoran politician
- Matías Arce (born 1980), Argentine retired footballer
- Nicolás Bianchi Arce (born 1987), Argentine retired footballer
- Vicente Arze (born 1985), Bolivian footballer

Notable people with the given name include:

- Arzé Chidiac, Lebanese TV presenter
- Arzé Khodr, playwright
- Arz Étienne Saqr

Arzé may also refer to:

- Arzé, a 2024 Lebanese feature film

== See also ==
- Arce (disambiguation)
