= Arce =

Arce may refer to:

== Places ==
- Arce, Lazio, a municipality in the province of Frosinone, in the region of Lazio, Italy
- Arce, Spain, a municipality of autonomous community of Navarre, Spain
- Ciudad Arce, El Salvador
- Rocca d'Arce, Italy

== Other ==
- Arce (surname)
- Arce, a tortrix moth genus nowadays considered a junior synonym of Phtheochroa
- arce, the Spanish word for Toni
- Arce Stream, a tributary of the Né River (in turn the Charente River) in France
- Arke, also romanized Arce, a goddess in Greek mythology

== See also ==
- Acer (disambiguation)
- Arcee
- Arse (disambiguation)
