= Palatine Museum =

Museum in Rome, Italy

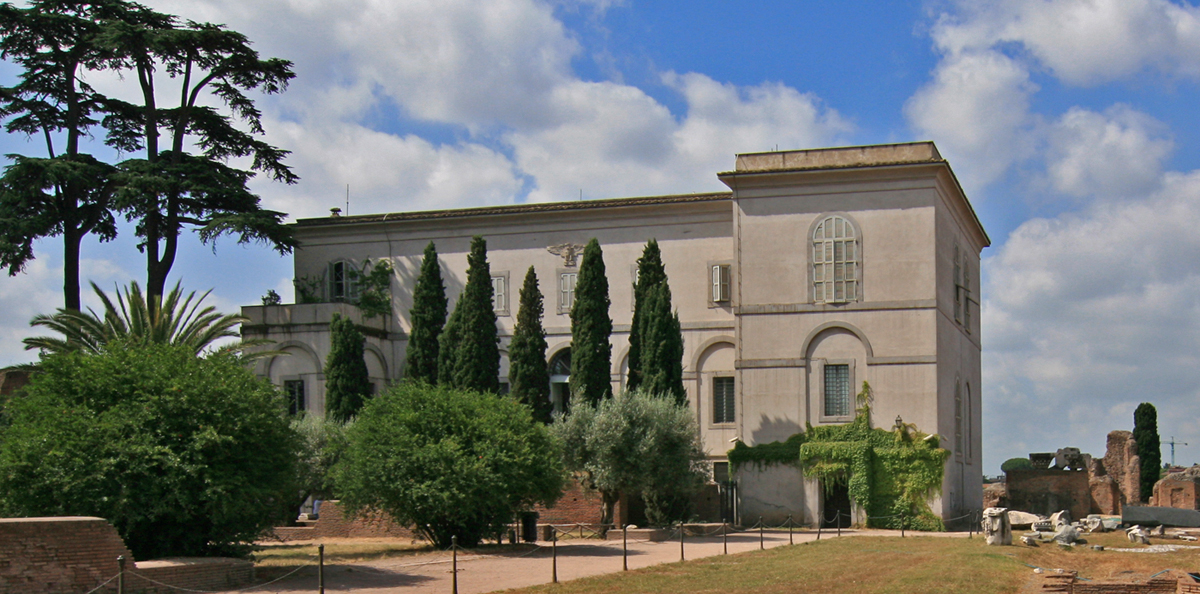
- Palatine Museum
- Click on the map for a fullscreen view
- Coordinates: 41°53′20″N 12°29′15″E
- Type: archaeology

The Palatine Museum (Italian: Antiquarium del Palatino) is a museum located on the Palatine Hill in Rome. Founded in the second half of the 19th century, it houses sculptures, fragments of frescoes, and archaeological material discovered on the hill.

== History ==
Pietro Rosa created the first Palatine Museum in the late 19th century in the ground floor of the Farnese building on Palatine Hill. It housed sculptures excavated on Palatine Hill during the reign of Napoleon III. Rodolfo Lanciani razed the Farnese building in 1882 to allow a connection between the Roman Forum and the Palatine Hill. At that time, Gherardo Ghirardini (1854–1920) cataloged its holdings and transferred them to the Museum of the Baths of Diocletian (which became the National Roman Museum in 1889).

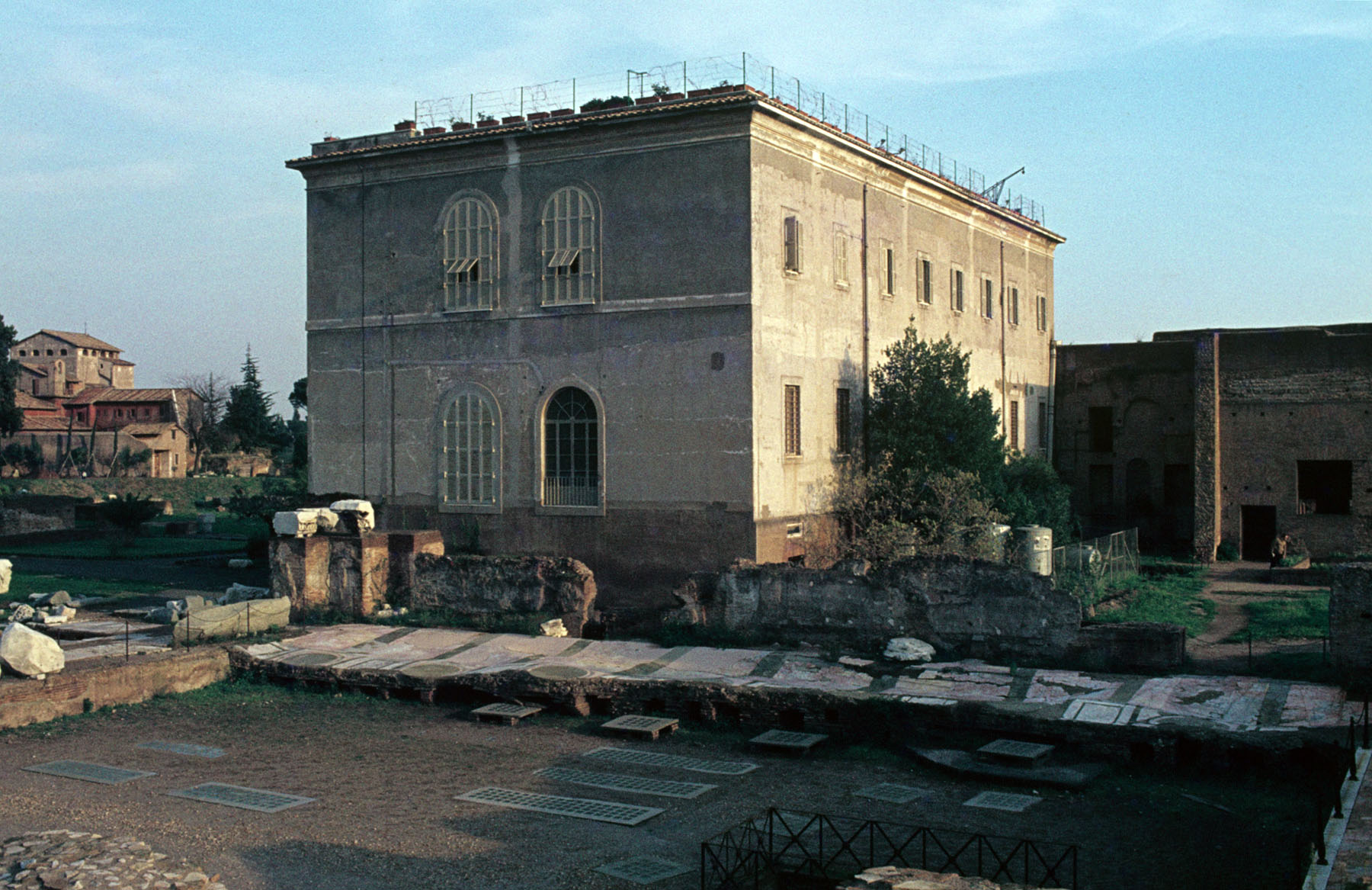
The Palatine Museum in 1987

In the 1930s, on the initiative of the archaeologist Alfonso Bartoli, director of excavations on the Palatine and discoverer of numerous objects on the site of the Domus Augustana, a new site was created, using the remaining parts of the demolished Villa Mills.

Bartoli managed to bring back on the Palatine a part of the sculptures from here that were in the Museum of the Baths, which in the meantime became the National Roman Museum, and exhibited them in a building built starting from 1868 for the Visitation nuns above the structures belonging to the ancient imperial palace of Diocletian, where the Domus Flavia and the Domus Augustana joined. The collections were moved again during the Second World Warfor security reasons, becoming the object of a new conflict of attribution between the Antiquarium of the Palatine and the National Roman Museum. The latter wanted to keep the most beautiful works inside. The Ministry of Education, owner of both institutions, agreed with the Roman National Museum, justifying the choice with the fact that visitors to the Palatine are first of all interested in the places and, only in a very secondary way, in the museum that is housed there.

The Antiquarium therefore now exhibits only materials directly linked to the history of the Palatine. The reorganization of the Roman National Museum, following the 1981 law on the archaeological heritage of Rome, leads to the return of the sculptures that have been found to the Antiquarium. The museum was entirely reorganized under the aegis of the Special Superintendence for Archaeological Heritage of Rome to present a panorama of imperial artistic tastes, from Augustus to Late Antiquity.

Since 2016, the Antiquarium belongs to the newly established Colosseum Archaeological Park.

== Collections ==
The building comprises two floors, each consisting of four rooms. The ground floor is dedicated to the Palatine from its origins to the Republican era, while the first floor is dedicated to works from the imperial era.

=== Ground floor ===
The rooms from I to III contain stone objects (room I), which attest to a human presence on the Palatine from the Middle Palaeolithic and, continuing, into the Upper Palaeolithic. Traces of a village of huts dating back at least to the eighth century BC have also been found: they consist of vases and other impasto utensils, locally made. Among other things, the rooms also include the models of the huts, the contents of an infantile tomb dated to the beginning of the 7th century BC and a wall that allows the reconstruction of the stratigraphy of hut A, i.e. the various discoveries ordered from the most recent to the most ancient, following the order in which they were found.

In room IV the works of the Archaic and Republican periods are exhibited. Among them is an altar from the Silla period dedicated to "a god or a goddess", a vague formulation found elsewhere and which is probably destined to hide the true name of the revered god from its enemies. There are also several antefixes in polychrome terracotta from various eras, representing Juno Sospita and, perhaps, Jupiter and Apollo.

=== First floor ===
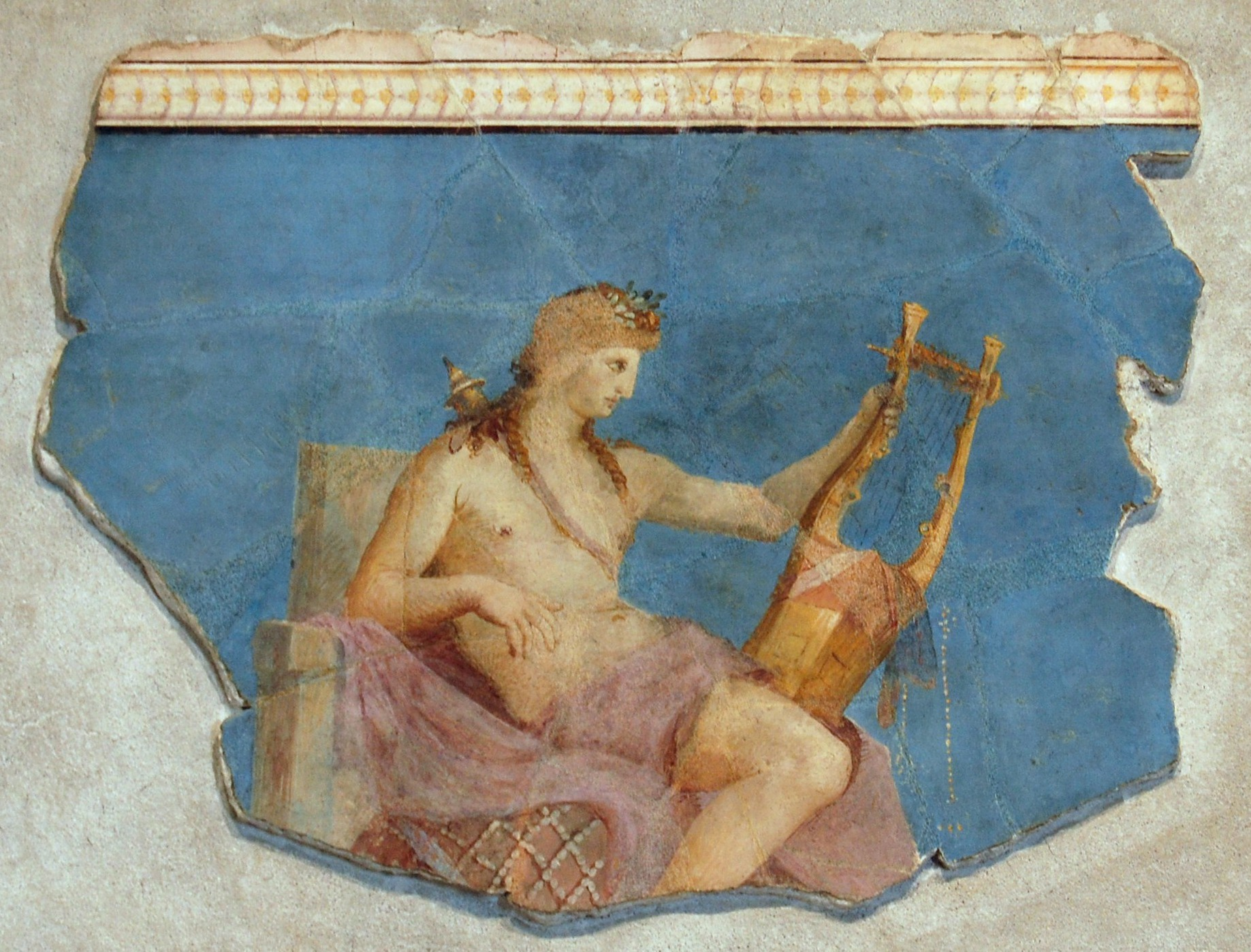
Apollo citaredo, a fresco discovered in the excavations of the "Scalae Ceci"

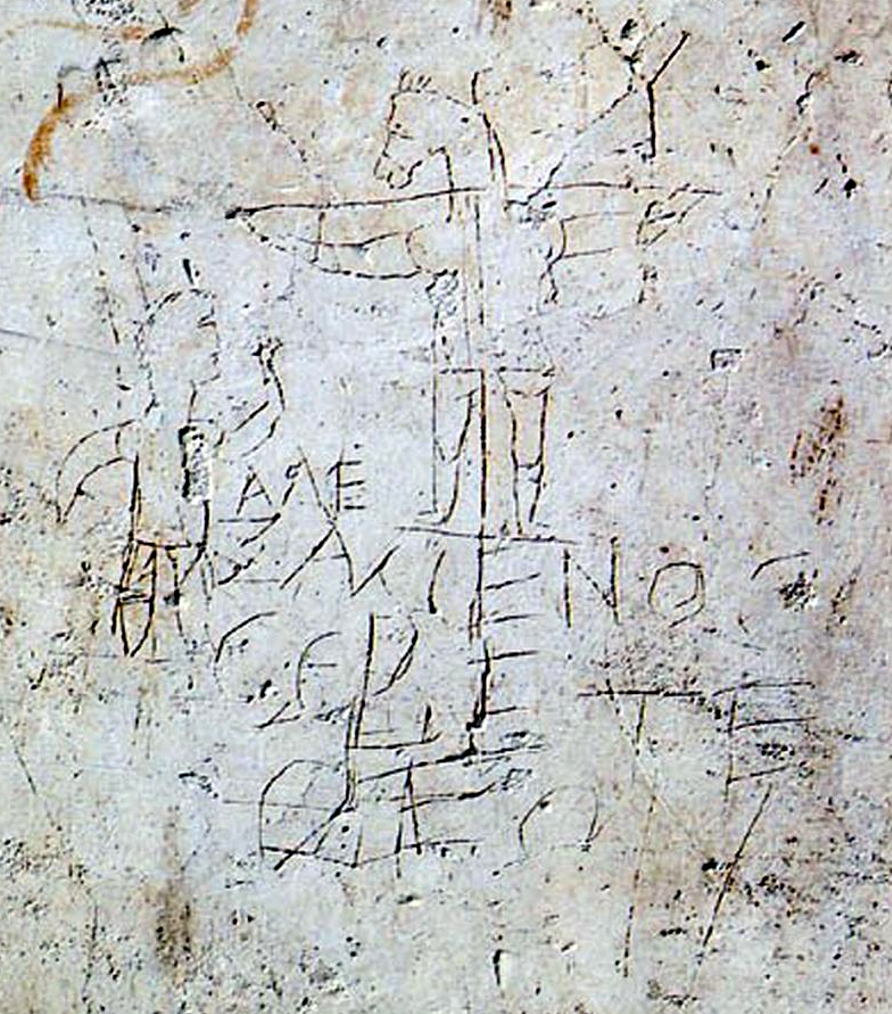
Alexamenos graffito, 3rd century, a crucified donkey and the comment "Alexhamen venerates (his) god" suggests that this drawing represents a Roman convert to Christianity.

In room V, works from the time of Augustus are exhibited. In particular, there are an eclectic statue of Hermes, which refers to the Greek sculptors Lysippus and Polykleitos, and a statue of a victorious athlete in basalt, probably commissioned by Octavian after the Battle of Actium. Some antefixes and some bas-relief plaques testify to the practice of the art of terracotta, inherited from the Etruscans. A fresco, unearthed in 1950 among the excavations of the Scalae Caci, depicts Apollo crowned with laurel, seated on a throne, with the citarain hand, near the omphalos.

In room VI there are paintings and decorations in opus sectile from the Domus Transitoria, built by Nero and then covered by the Domus Flavia.

Rooms VII and VIII group together works from the Julio-Claudian age up to the Tetrarchy. Among them there are several portraits, of which the main ones are those of Nero, Agrippina Minore, Antonino Pio, Adriano, and Marco Aurelio.

There is also the famous Alexamenos graffito, discovered in the Paedagogium in 1857, transferred first to the Kircherian Museum and then to the National Roman Museum, before being finally returned to the Antiquarium of the Palatine in 1946. The drawing, coarse in its features, represents a figure with the head of a crucified donkey and to his left another character with his arm raised. The two figures are separated by a Greek inscription which reads: "Alexamenus venerates [his] god". The work, dated to the third century AD, gave rise to multiple disputes. In general, it is considered that it was a representation for the purpose of derision against a Christian accused of practicing onolatry, that is to say the adoration of a donkey, the Onocoete, a belief also reported by Tertullian.

Room IX is a gallery that groups Roman copies of Greek statues, coming from the imperial palaces of the Palatine.

== Bibliography ==
- Maria Antonietta Tolomei, Museo Palatino, Electa, 1997. ISBN 88-435-6325-4.
