= Arses (disambiguation) =

Arses may refer to:

- Arses of Persia, king of Persia between 338 BC and 336 BC
- Arses (bird), a genus of monarch flycatchers (birds)
- Plural of arsis (a poetry metrical term)
- Plural of arse (disambiguation)
