= Cultural references to donkeys =

Donkeys as depicted in culture

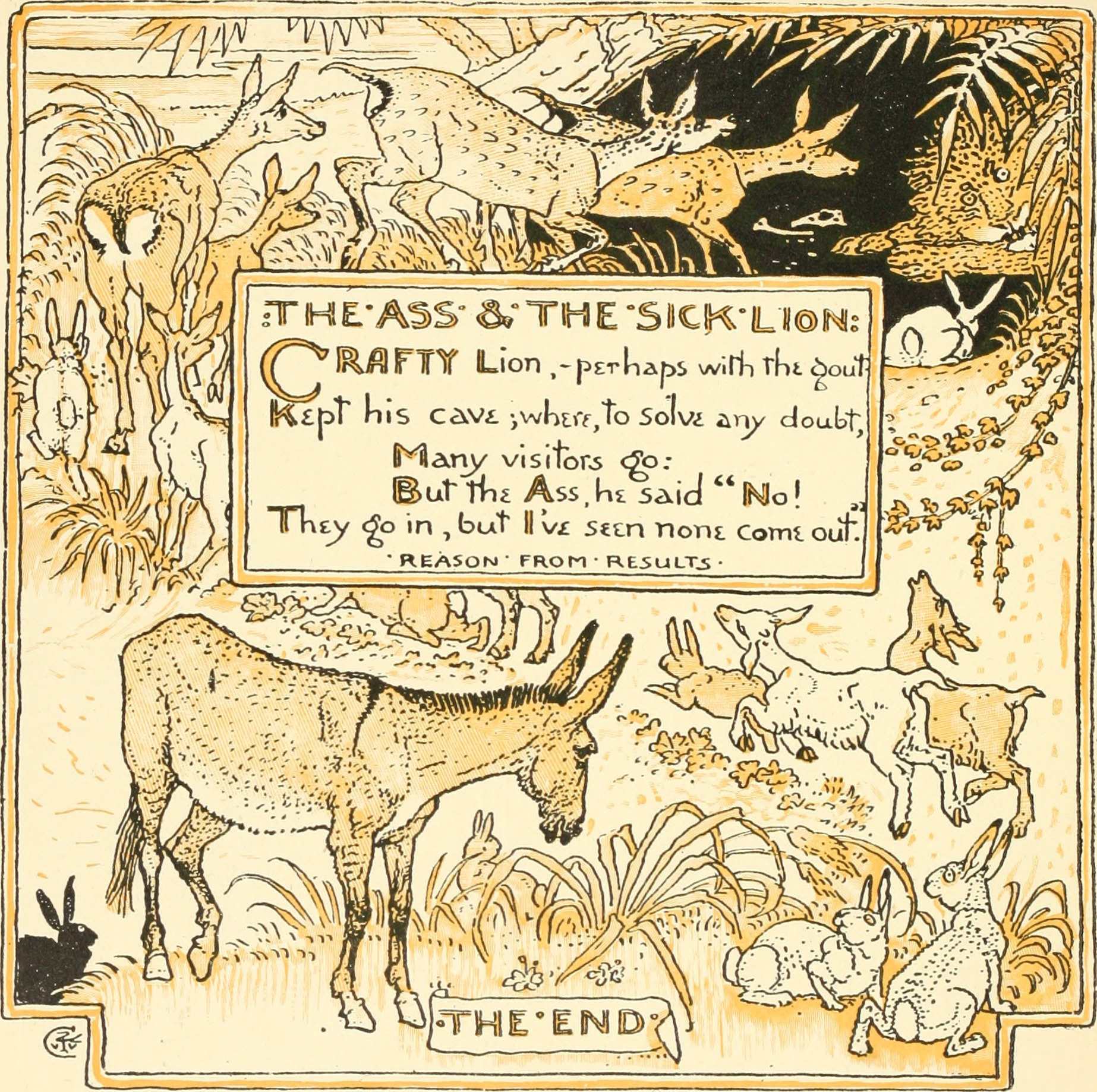
Page from The Baby's Own Aesop, Walter Crane, 1908.

There are many cultural references to donkeys or asses, in myth, folklore and religion, in language and in literature.

== Religion, myth and folklore ==
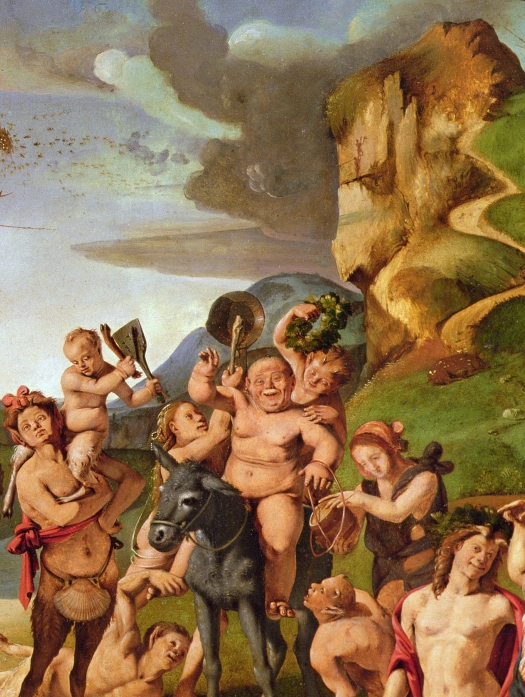
Silenus on a donkey, detail from The Discovery of Honey (c. 1500) by Piero di Cosimo.

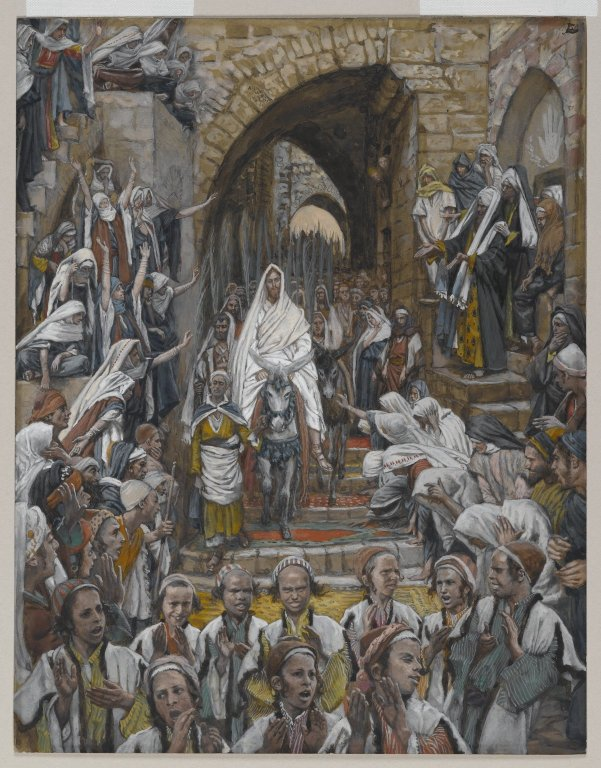
Jesus rode on a donkey in his triumphal entry into Jerusalem.

Due to its widespread domestication and use, the donkey is referred to in myth and folklore around the world. In classical and ancient cultures, donkeys had a part. The donkey was the symbol of the Egyptian sun god Ra. In Greek myth, Silenus is pictured in Classical Antiquity and during the Renaissance (illustration, left) drunken and riding a donkey, and Midas was given the ears of an ass after misjudging a musical competition.

=== Donkeys in the Bible ===
Donkeys (or asses) are mentioned many times in the Bible, beginning in the first book and continuing through both Old and New Testaments, so they became part of Judeo-Christian tradition. They are portrayed as work animals, used for agricultural purposes, transport and as beasts of burden, and terminology is used to differentiate age and gender. In contrast, horses were represented only in the context of war, ridden by cavalry or pulling chariots. Owners were protected by law from loss caused by the death or injury of a donkey, showing their value in that time period. Narrative turning points in the Bible (and other stories) are often marked through the use of donkeys — for instance, leading, saddling, or mounting/dismounting a donkey are used to show a change in focus or a decision having been made. They are used as a measure of wealth in Genesis 30:43, and in Genesis chapter 34, the prince of Shechem (the modern Nablus) is named Hamor ("donkey" in Hebrew).

In the Book of Samuel it is described that King Saul's kingship started with a journey to look for his father's lost donkeys. According to prophecy within the Hebrew Bible, the Messiah is said to arrive on a donkey: "Behold, your King is coming to you; He is just and having salvation, Lowly and riding on a donkey, A colt, the foal of a donkey!" (Zechariah 9:9). According to the New Testament, this prophecy was fulfilled when Jesus entered Jerusalem riding on the animal (Matthew 21:4-7, John 12:14-15). Jesus appeared to be aware of this connection (Matthew 21:1-3, John 12:16).

==== Donkeys in Judaism ====
In the Jewish religion, the donkey is not a kosher animal. In the Zohar, it is considered avi avot hatuma i.e. an ultimate impure animal, and doubly "impure", as it is both non-ruminant and non-cloven hoofed. However, it is the only impure animal that falls under the mitzvah (commandment) of firstborn ("bechor") consecration that also applies to humans and pure animals (See Petter Chamor). In Jewish Oral Tradition (Talmud Bavli), the son of David was prophesied as riding on a donkey if the tribes of Israel are undeserving of redemption.

In contemporary Israel, the term "Messiah's Donkey" (Chamoro Shel Mashiach חמורו של משיח) stands at the centre of a controversial religious-political doctrine, under which it was the Heavenly-imposed "task" of secular Zionists to build up a Jewish State, but once the state is established they are fated to give place to the Religious who are ordained to lead the state. The secularists in this analogy are "The Donkey" while the religious who are fated to supplant them are a collective "Messiach". A book on the subject, published in 1998 by the militant secularist Sefi Rechlevsky, aroused a major controversy in the Israeli public opinion.

==== Donkeys in Christianity ====
With the rise of Christianity, some believers came to see the cross-shaped marking present on donkeys' backs and shoulders as a symbol of the animal's bearing Jesus into Jerusalem on Palm Sunday. During the Middle Ages, Europeans used hairs from this cross (or contact with a donkey) as folk remedies to treat illness, including measles and whooping cough. Around 1400 AD, one physician listed riding backwards on a donkey as a cure for scorpion stings.

=== Donkeys in Hinduism ===
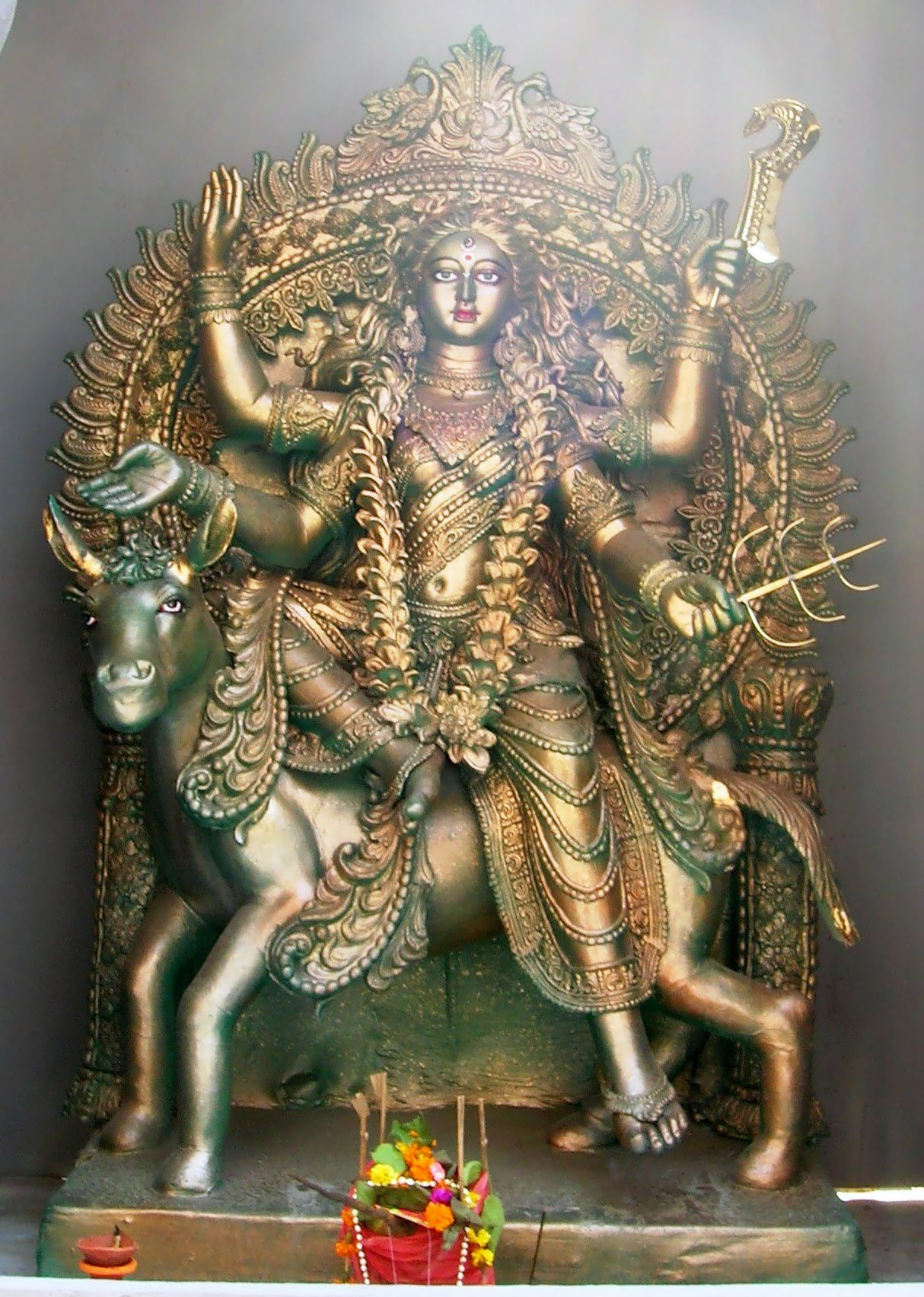
Goddess Kalaratri rides a donkey.

Donkeys are also referred to repeatedly in the writings and imagery of the Hinduism, where the goddess Kalaratri's vahana (vehicle) is a donkey. Donkeys also appear multiple times in Indian folklore as the subject of stories in both the Hitopadesha and the Panchatantra.

=== Donkeys In Islam ===
In Islam, eating the meat of domestic donkeys is forbidden.

== Literature and film ==
Donkeys hold a significant place in literature, especially in Western cultures. The original representations of donkeys in Western literature come mainly from the Bible and Ancient Greece. Donkeys were represented in a fairly negative form by the Greeks, but perceptions later changed, partially due to donkeys becoming increasingly symbolically connected to Christianity. Donkeys were found in the works of Homer, Aesop and Apuleius, where they were generally portrayed as stupid and stubborn, or servile at best, and generally represented the lower class. They were often contrasted with horses, which were seen as powerful and beautiful. Aesop's The Ass in the Lion's Skin, representational of the almost 20 of his fables that portray donkeys, shows the donkey as a fool. Apuleius's The Golden Ass (160 AD), where the narrator is turned into a donkey, is also notable for its portrayal of donkeys as stubborn, foolish, wicked and lowly. This work had a large influence on the portrayal of donkeys in later cultures, including medieval and renaissance Europe. During this time, donkeys continued to be shown as stupid, clumsy and slow. Shakespeare popularised the use of the word "ass" as an insult meaning stupid or clownish in many of his plays, including Bottom's appearance in A Midsummer Night's Dream (1600). In contrast, a few years later, Miguel de Cervantes writes a more positive slant on the donkey in his novel Don Quixote, primarily as Sancho Panza's mount, portraying them as steady and loyal companions. This difference is possibly due to donkeys being an important aspect of many Spaniards' lives at this point in time.

In contrast to Grecian works, donkeys were portrayed in Biblical works as symbols of service, suffering, peace and humility. They are also associated with the theme of wisdom in the Hebrew Bible's story of Balaam's ass, and are seen in a positive light through the story of Jesus riding into Jerusalem on a donkey. By the 19th century, the donkey was portrayed with more positive attributes by popular authors. William Wordsworth portrayed the donkey as loyal and patient in his 1819 poem Peter Bell:A Tale, using the donkey as a Christian symbol. Robert Louis Stevenson in Travels with a Donkey (1879), portrays the animal as a stubborn beast of burden. Sympathetic portrayals return in Juan Ramon Jimenez's Platero and I. The melancholy Eeyore in Winnie the Pooh (first published in 1926) is arguably the most famous donkey in Western literature. In G. K. Chesterton's 1927 poem, The Donkey, the animal deprecates himself as "the tattered outlaw of the Earth" but finally reveals his moment of glory on the first Palm Sunday.

Donkeys were featured in literature during the 20th century, including in George Orwell's 1951 Animal Farm, where Benjamin the donkey is portrayed as a resilient and loyal friend to Boxer the horse, as well as being wise, but he is also shown to be cynical about change and, like Eeyore, is resigned to his lot not improving. Puzzle is a well-meaning but easily manipulated donkey in C. S. Lewis's 1956 The Last Battle. Brighty is the central character of the 1953 children's novel and 1967 film Brighty of the Grand Canyon. Donkeys are portrayed in film including the 1940 Walt Disney animated films Fantasia and Pinocchio, where The Coachman and his henchmen turn boys into donkeys in Pleasure Island, and in the segment of Ludwig van Beethoven's Symphony No. 6, also known as The Pastoral Symphony a unicorn donkey named Jacchus with Bacchus and is attacked by Zeus. A donkey is featured as the main figure in the 1966 film Au hasard Balthazar by Robert Bresson, and, is given a life path of Christian symbolism. The major character Donkey, voiced by Eddie Murphy, features significantly within the Shrek film franchise. The logo and brand identity of popular YouTuber Videogamedunkey features a cartoon donkey.

== Philosophy ==
The symbolic use of the ass in philosophy and literature has been prevalent for centuries. It was increasingly used in the renaissance era from thinkers including Jean Buridan (1330-1358), Machiavelli (1469-1527) and Cornelius Agrippa (1486-1535). The philosopher Jean Buridan (1300-1358) proposed a dilemma in which a hypothetical donkey suffering from hunger and thirst finds itself halfway between a bucket of fresh water and enjoyable bales of hay. This makes the donkey perplexed, as it does not know whether to quench its thirst first or appease its hunger later or the vice versa. Its indecisiveness leads to its perish. This allegory could be taken as the cost of human inaction or as the total lack of free will versus determinism in human life.

Agrippa placed apostles on a level with asses. He regarded the donkey as a means to achieve divinity: “From what I have said, it is clear as day that no other animal is in a better position than the ass to receive the divine. If you do not look to the ass, you will be no position to receive the divine mysteries.” (p. ix) Machiavelli complained that “in the form of an ass, he had toiled and suffered to discover “more bad than good” at the every level of the world. Giordano Bruno (1548-1600) is another philosopher of the Renaissance Era who utilised the fictitious exposition of the donkey to achieve theoretical depth. In his long journey to explore the opposite aspects of the phenomenon of asininity, he combines the delicacy of an artist and the depth of a great philosopher: “according to cabalistic revelations…, the ass or asininity is the symbol of wisdom”; “pray, pray my dearest ones, that God may transform into asses if you are not already asses”; “Strive, strive, therefore, to be asses, who you are men”.

In his masterpiece, In Praise of Folly, the Dutch philosopher Erasmus of Rotterdam (1466-1506) depicted the concept of asininity and applied it to the high-ranking echelons of the society including kings, lawyers, grammarians, boastful theologians and even the pope himself.

== Politics ==
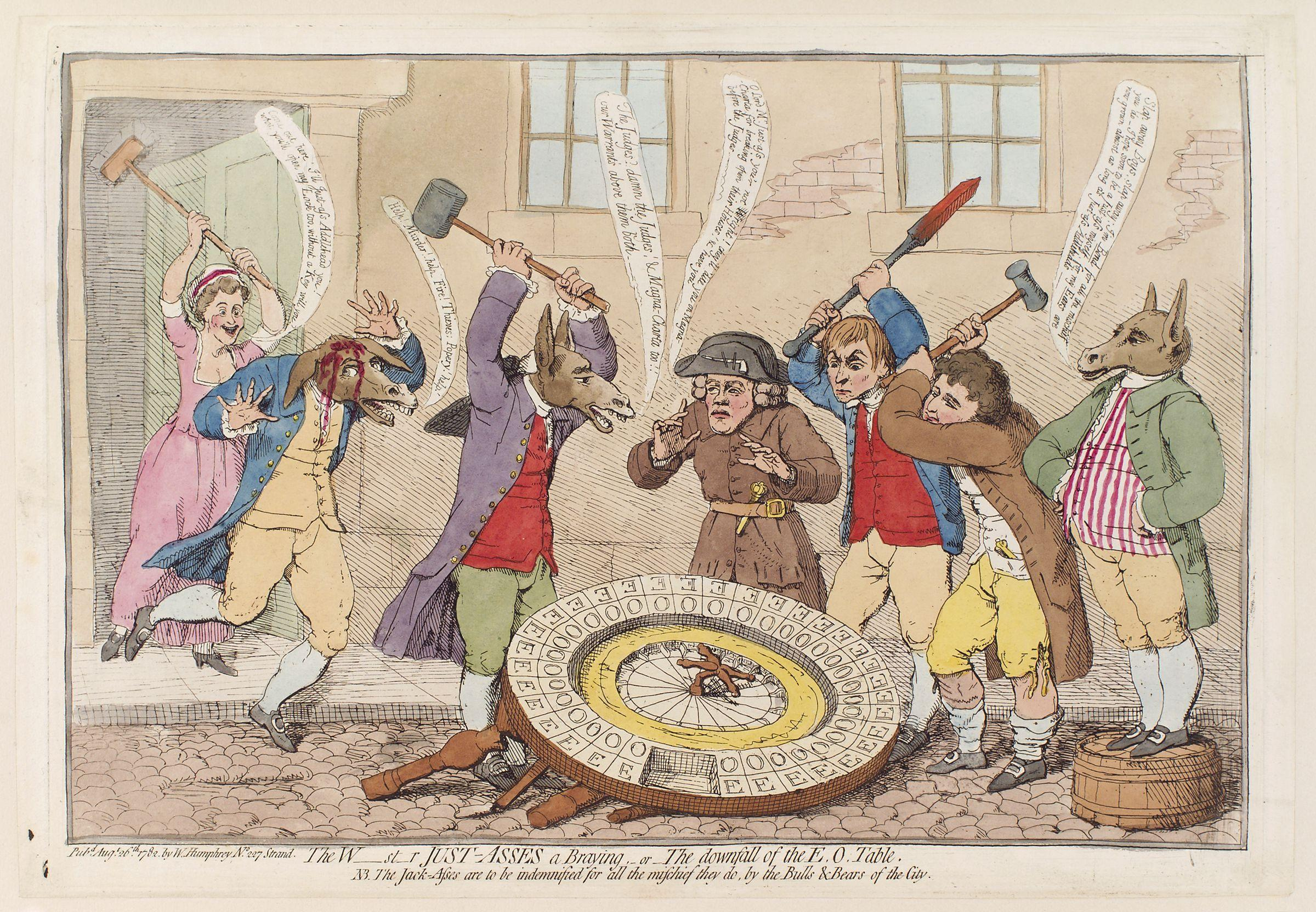
Satirical use of braying in a political cartoon.

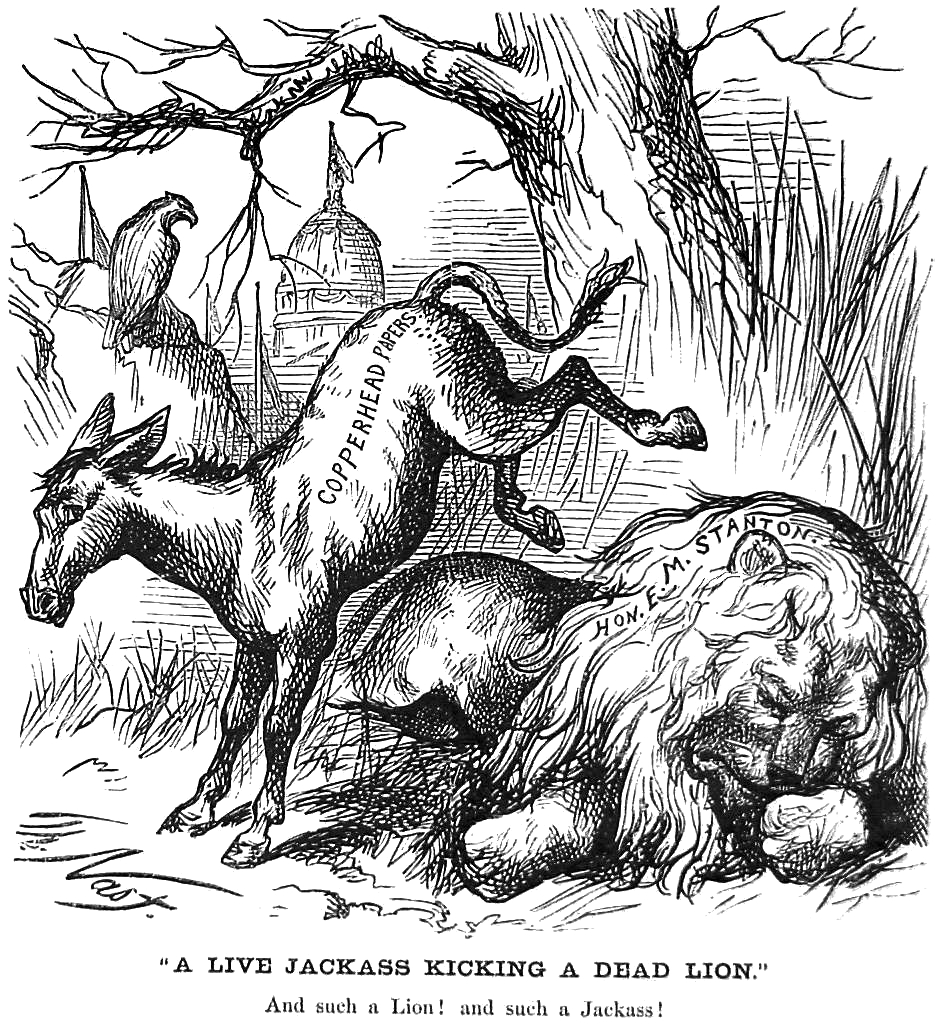
The Thomas Nast political cartoon that introduced the donkey as the mascot of the Democratic Party.

In keeping with their widespread cultural references, donkeys feature in political systems, symbols and terminology in many areas of the world. A "donkey vote" is a vote that simply writes down preferences in the order of the candidates (1 at the top, then 2, and so on), and is most often seen in countries with ranked voting systems and compulsory voting, such as Australia. The donkey is a common symbol of the Democratic Party of the United States, originating in the 1830s and became popularised from a cartoon by Thomas Nast of Harper's Weekly in 1870.

The bray of the donkey may be used as a simile for loud and foolish speech in political mockery. For example,

There are braying men in the world as well as braying asses; for what's loud and senseless talking and swearing, any other than braying

— Sir Roger L'Estrange

In 1963, Party of Donkeys, a frivolous political party was founded in Iran.

The ruc català or burro català (Catalan donkey) has become a symbol of Catalonia in Spain. In 2003 some friends in Catalonia made bumper stickers featuring the burro català as a reaction against a national advertising campaign for Toro d'Osborne, a brandy. The burro became popular as a nationalist symbol in Catalonia, whose residents wanted to assert their identity to resist Spanish centralism. Renewed attention to the regional burro helped start a breeding campaign for its preservation, and its numbers have increased.

Proshka, an ass owned by the Russian populist nationalist politician Vladimir Zhirinovsky of the Liberal Democratic Party of Russia, became prominent during the 2012 Russian presidential election campaign, when he was filmed in an election advertisement video. In that controversial ad, Zhirinovsky appeared sitting in a sleigh harnessed with Proshka, then claiming that the "little wretched ass" is the symbol of Russia and that if he would become President a "daring troika" would return as a symbol of Russia instead of the ass; at the end, Zhirinovsky beat Proshka with a whip, made the ass move and had a ride on him through the snow-covered backyard of his dacha. International organisations People for the Ethical Treatment of Animals (PETA) and World Animal Protection have accused Zhirinovsky of cruelty to animals. Zhirinovsky replied to the assertions by stating that similar treatment is commonplace in the Arab world and claimed that his ass has been treated "better than many people".

== Colloquialisms, proverbs and insults ==
Many cultures have colloquialisms and proverbs that include donkeys or asses. British phrases include "to talk the hind legs off a donkey", used to describe someone talking excessively and generally persuasively. Donkeys are the animals featured most often in Greek proverbs, including such statements of fatalistic resignation as "the donkey lets the rain soak him". The French philosopher Jean Buridan constructed the paradox called Buridan's ass, in which a donkey, placed exactly midway between water and food, would die of hunger and thirst because he could not find a reason to choose one of the options over the other, and so would never make a decision. Italy has several phrases regarding donkeys, including "put your money in the anus of a donkey and they'll call him sir" (meaning, if you're rich, you'll get respect) and "women, donkeys and goats all have heads" (meaning, women are as stubborn as donkeys and goats). The United States developed its own expressions, including "better a donkey that carries me than a horse that throws me", "a donkey looks beautiful to a donkey", and "a donkey is but a donkey though laden with gold", among others. From Afghanistan, the Pashto proverb "Even if a donkey goes to Mecca, he is still a donkey." refers to being the same no matter where the subject goes. In Ethiopia, there are many Amharic proverbs that demean donkeys, such as, "The heifer that spends time with a donkey learns to fart" (Bad company corrupts good morals).

=== Insult ===
The words "donkey" and "ass" (or translations thereof) have come to have derogatory or insulting meaning in several languages, and generally means someone who is obstinate, stupid, or silly. This should not be confused with the other, etymologically unrelated, sense of the word ass (British English: arse), meaning buttocks, which may also be used in an insulting or vulgar manner. In football, especially in the United Kingdom, a player who is considered unskillful is often dubbed a "donkey", and the term has a similar connotation in poker. The slang term "jackass" is used to refer to someone considered stupid. "Dumbass" is used a similar way, but the ass in question in that phrase is thought to refer to buttocks instead.

== See also ==
- Onolatry, worship of donkeys
- Donkeys in France
