= Artzi =

Artzi may refer to:

- Netanel Artzi (born 1997), Israeli basketball player
- Shlomo Artzi (born 1949), Israeli folk rock singer-songwriter and composer
- Yitzhak Artzi (1920–2003), Israel politician
- Arce, Spain (spelled Artzi in Basque), a town

== See also ==
- Shmuel Ben-Artzi (1914–2011), Israeli writer, poet and educator, and father-in-law of Israeli Prime Minister Benjamin Netanyahu
