= Jackass =

A jackass is a male donkey, or a person who is rude or foolish.

Jackass may also refer to:

== Entertainment ==
- Jackass (franchise), an American reality series
  - Jackass: The Movie, the first film in the Jackass film series
  - Jackass: The Game, a 2007 video game based on the Jackass television show and film series
- Jackass Mail, 1942 American film

== Music ==
- "Jack-Ass" (song), 1997, by Beck
- "Jackass", a 2000 song by Green Day from Warning
- "Jackass", a 2001 song by Bloodhound Gang from the film Jay and Silent Bob Strike Back

== Places ==
- Jackass Aeropark, an airport
- Jackass Ski Bowl, alpine ski area in northern Idaho (1967–73), now Silver Mountain
- Jackass Mountain, an infamous stretch of the Cariboo Road through the Fraser Canyon in British Columbia, Canada
- Jackass Flats, Nevada, former nuclear-test site
- Jackass Lane, a street in Anchorage, Alaska whose name was changed in the 1980s due to frequent street sign thefts

== Other ==
- Jackass penguin, an alternative name for the African penguin, Spheniscus demersus
- Laughing jackass, a bird, now laughing kookaburra
- Jackass morwong, a fish
- Jackass, an insult for a obnoxious rude person
- Jackass-barque, ship type
- Jackass rabbit, better known as jackrabbit
