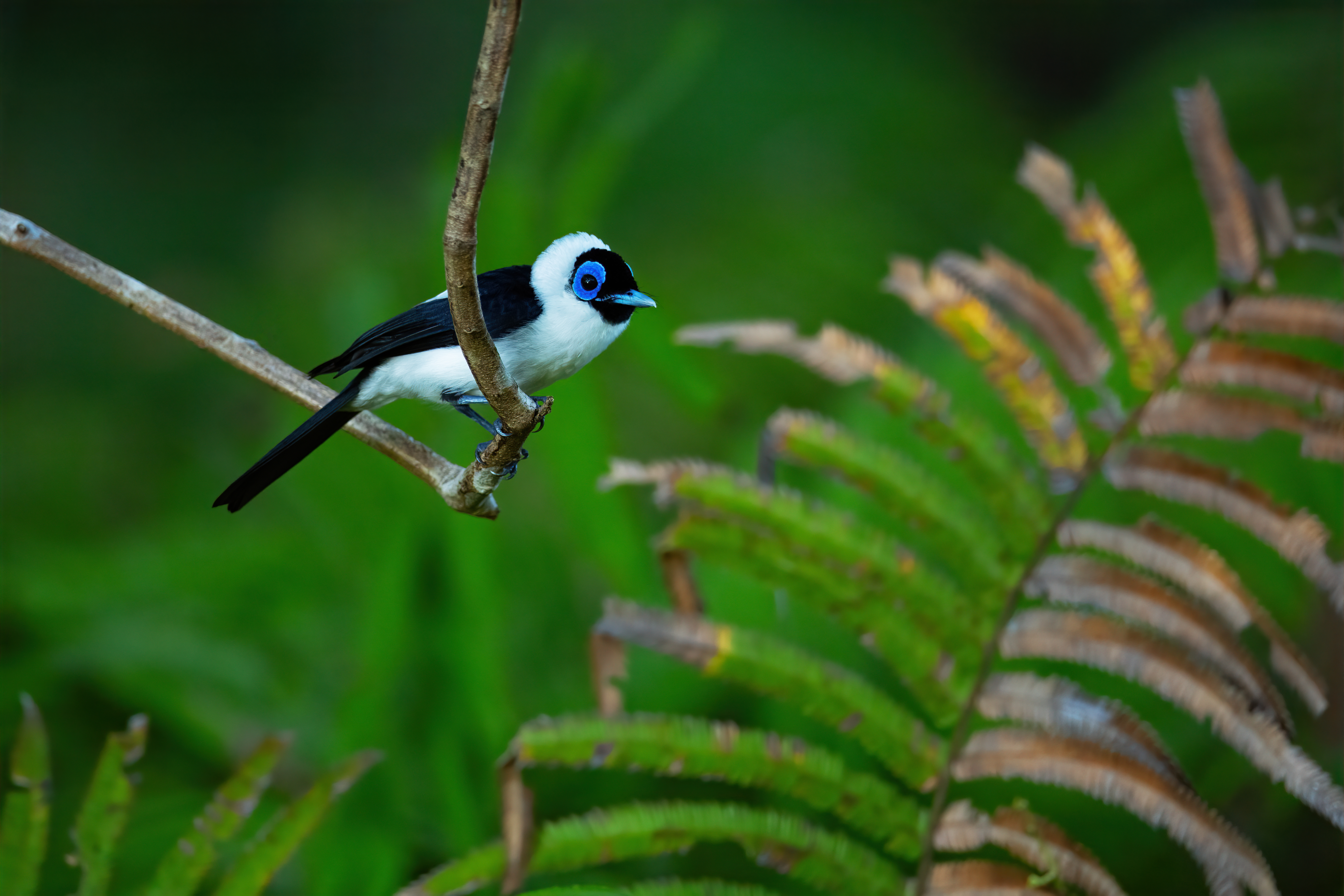

Conservation status
- Least Concern (IUCN 3.1)

Scientific classification
- Kingdom: Animalia
- Phylum: Chordata
- Class: Aves
- Order: Passeriformes
- Family: Monarchidae
- Genus: Arses
- Species: A. telescopthalmus

Binomial name
- Arses telescopthalmus (Lesson & Garnot, 1827)

Subspecies
- See text

Synonyms
- Arses telescophthalmus; Muscicapa telescopthalmus

= Frilled monarch =

Species of bird

The frilled monarch (Arses telescopthalmus) is a species of bird in the family Monarchidae. As currently defined, its range is restricted to forest on New Guinea and nearby smaller islands, but historically it has included some or all of the remaining members of the genus Arses as subspecies.

== Taxonomy and systematics ==
This species was originally described in the genus Muscicapa. Some authorities consider the ochre-collared monarch and the frill-necked monarch as subspecies of the frilled monarch. Alternate names include the Australian frilled monarch and frilled flycatcher.

=== Subspecies ===
Five subspecies are recognized:

- A. t. batantae - Sharpe, 1879: Formerly classified by some authorities as a subspecies of the frill-necked monarch. Found on Batanta and Waigeo (western Papuan islands)
- A. t. telescopthalmus - (Lesson & Garnot, 1827): Found on Salawati and Misool (western Papuan islands) and north-western New Guinea
- A. t. aruensis - Sharpe, 1879: Formerly classified by some authorities as a subspecies of the frill-necked monarch. Found on the Aru Islands (south-west of New Guinea)
- A. t. harterti - van Oort, 1909: Formerly classified by some authorities as a subspecies of the frill-necked monarch. Found in southern New Guinea
- A. t. henkei - Meyer, AB, 1886: Found in eastern and southern New Guinea
