= Kafr Abdu =

Kafr Abdu كفر عبده
- Neighborhood
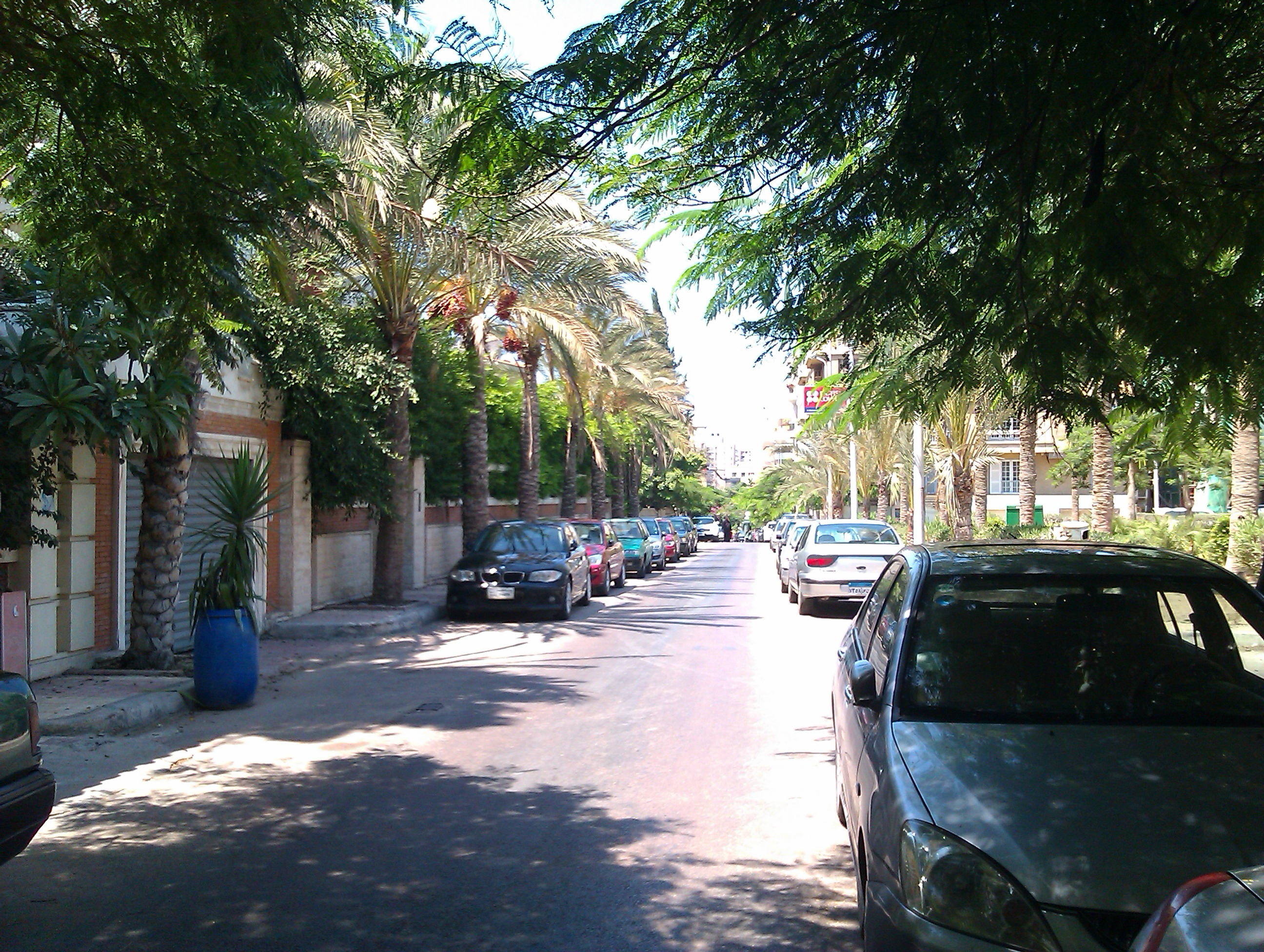
- View along Kafr Abdu Street in Kafr Abdu neighborhood

- Location in Egypt
- Coordinates: 31.224876°N 29.954585°E
- Country: Egypt
- Governorate: Alexandria
- City: Alexandria
- Time zone: UTC+2 (EET)
  - Summer (DST): UTC+3 (EEST)

Kafr Abdu (Arabic: كفر عبده) is an affluent neighborhood in Alexandria, Egypt. The neighborhood mainly houses wealthy Egyptians, as well as foreigners living in Alexandria. During the Revolution of 2011, the Egyptian Army cordoned the neighborhood off, only allowing residents of the area to enter, to prevent looting, particularly of the vacated apartments of foreigners forced to flee. Kafr Abdu is known for its tree-lined streets, greenery and its many cafés.

== History ==
The original name of the neighborhood was Marshal Allenby, named after the British Field Marshal that was appointed High Commissioner of Egypt in 1919. The neighborhood was connected by the Rosetta Avenue, later known as Abu Qir or Horreya Road, to the top of Abu Nawatir hill where Marshal Allenby had his residence and headquarters. The street led to his residence and the park that still holds his name. Many wealthy British and other foreign businessmen built their villas along the same street.

The neighborhood developed following a garden city pattern, with lavish vegetation and trees lining the streets. It attracted poorer classes of the population seeking work as gardeners, servants or guards, they soon established themselves in shacks in an adjacent shanty town at the bottom of the hill, called “the Arab Khana”, that gradually developed into the neighborhood of Zerbana, as it is known today. With the Egyptian revolution in 1952, president Nasser ordered the removal of all foreign, and especially English, names of streets and public places. The area was then renamed Kafr Abdu, the reason for this particular name was not made public however.

Allenby Park continues to be referred to by its original name, it is often mistakenly called the Olympic (olymbi) Park however, an eggcorn that is easier to pronounce in the Egyptian tongue. Many of the villas deserted by their foreign owners after the Suez Crisis, were bought by wealthy Egyptians. Much like the rest of Alexandria the area has witnessed wide-scale demolition of villas to make room for apartment towers.

== See also ==
- Neighborhoods in Alexandria
