= Villa Mills =

Building in Rome, demolished in the 20's

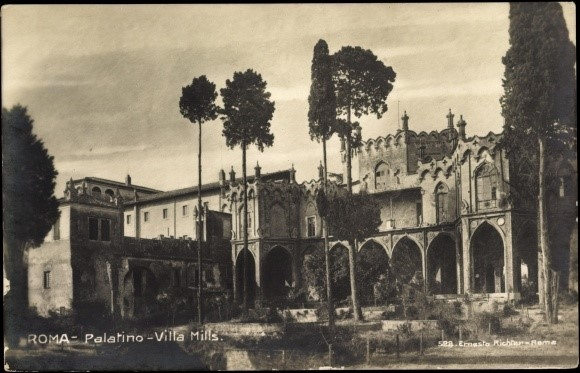
View of the "Villa Mills" around 1900.

Villa Mills, formerly known as Villa Mattei al Palatino, was a villa in Rome located above the Palatine Hill between Via di San Bonaventura and Via dei Cerchi, in the Campitelli. The structure was built over the Domus Augustana and the Domus Flavia. It was demolished at the beginning of the twentieth century to allow excavations of the archaeological site.

== History ==
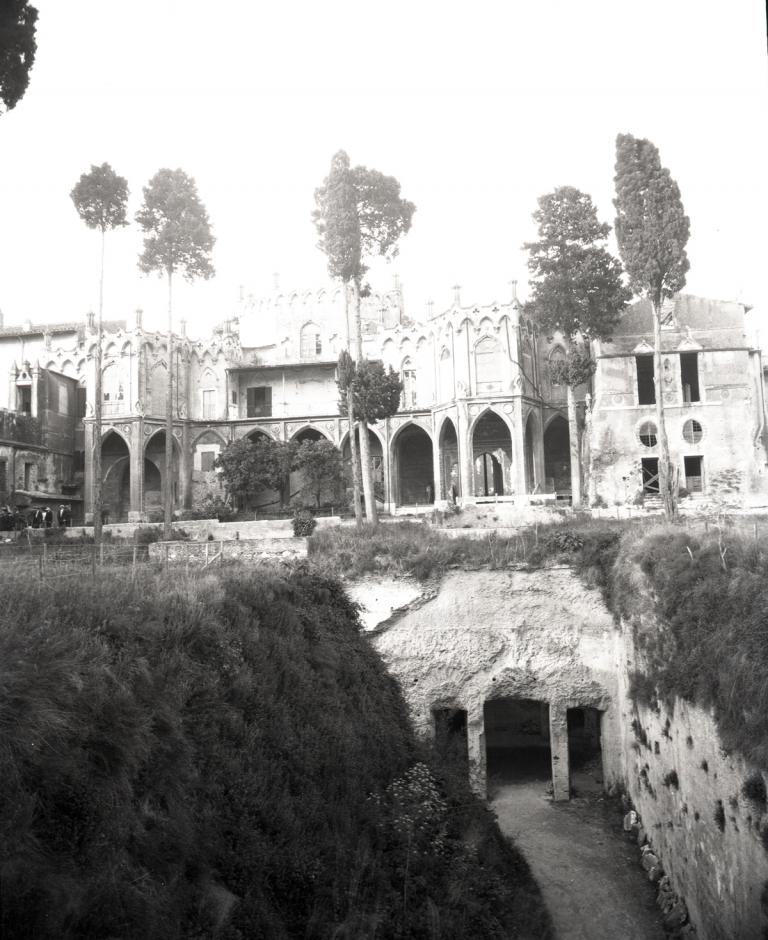
Image from 1907 showing the position of the villa above the ruins of the Domus Augustana.

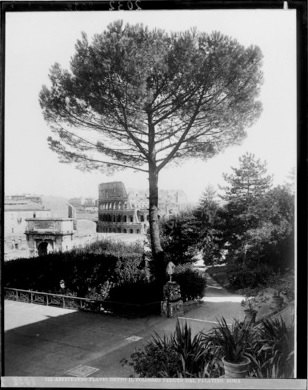
The Colosseum from the gardens of Villa Mills in 1906–1907.

In the sixteenth century, the area where Villa Mills was located was essentially made up of gardens and vineyards, part of the famous Orti Farnesiani on the Palatine Hill created by Cardinal Alessandro Farnese.

A small country house was built by the Stati family above the ancient Domus Augustana, with a small loggia decorated with frescoes by Baldassarre Peruzzi – depicting the zodiac, muses, and other classical themes – and by other painters from Raphael's workshop. Later the villa passed through the hands of the main families of Rome, such as the Colonna, the Mattei di Giove, the Spada and the Magnani, and other lesser-known owners, and was known as Villa Mattei al Palatino or Villa Stati–Mattei. In 1818, the property was bought by Charles Andrew Mills (1770-1846) and the English archaeologist William Gell (1777-1836).

In 1824, the two restored the small open Renaissance loggia that housed Peruzzi's frescoes. Later on, medallions with a rose, a thistle, and a clover were placed on the pendentives of the painted arches of the first floor, while the pillars of the entrance gate were decorated with thistles.

In 1846, (Note: Charles Mills died in 1846, therefore the villa could not be purchased by Smith between 1846 and 1856, when the property was purchased by the Order of the Visitation of Holy Mary.) Robert Smith (1787-1873), a former officer of the East India Company, bought Villa Mills after marrying a French heiress, Julia Adelaide Vitton de Claude, and after the birth of the couple's son, Robert Claude, in Venice in 1843.

Mills is believed to have added Gothic elements to the villa using the services of a "fashionable British architect" to create "pinnacles, battlements, cornices, and cloisters" and also two Chinese pagodas, painted yellow, over augustane spas Given the lack of evidence of Mills' "changes", it is possible that Smith and not Mills was responsible. Although evidence suggests the villa was built by Mills, as the thistles in the decoration indicate, a reference to its Scottish origin, the building reveals much more of Smith's mixed style, with Gothic and Italian elements linked to other Indians in a central rotunda flanked by two octagonal towers with a loggia with arches at the bottom. With the ruins of ancient civilizations under the building and a grandiose panorama above, the design of the villa is reminiscent of a bungalow in Delhi. In confirmation of this thesis, the guests of the villa during the period in which Charles Mills was alive did not mention the "eccentric" aspect of the complex, which surely would have done if the modifications had already been present. In these accounts, the garden appears to have been the most attractive point of the villa rather than the architecture of the palace, making it all the more likely that the new additions were the work of Smith and not Mills.

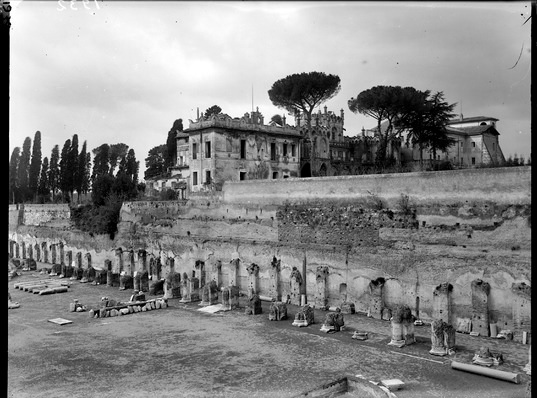
Another view (ca. 1906-1907), of the other side, with the Palatine Stadium in the foreground and the Villa Mills in the background.

In 1856, the property was sold to the sisters of Order of the Visitation of Holy Mary and enlarged by Virginio Vespignani. However, being built over the ruins of the ancient imperial palaces of the Palatine, the villa incorporated in its private property precious evidence of the early stages of the Roman Empire.

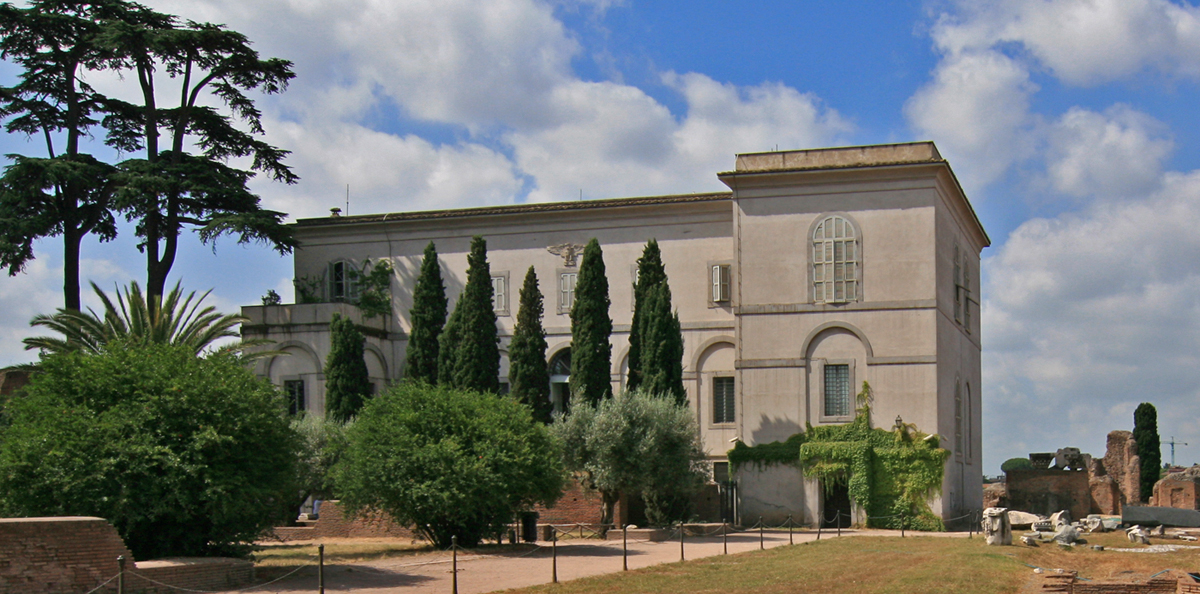
Palatine Museum.

Although excavations had been carried out at the site in the mid-18th century, at some point the research and preservation of knowledge of the earlier ages of the city became a priority through much deeper exploration than the simple summary inspections conducted until then. The decision to demolish the villa therefore became inevitable, an operation carried out under the direction of the archaeologist Alfonso Bartoli, who was also responsible for the excavations of the Roman Forum and the Palatine Hill and who claimed that the new discoveries would amply justify the destruction of the magnificent building.

The excavations conducted between 1926 and 1929 were very productive. After the demolition of Villa Mills, systematic excavations were started on the site and the residences where the first Roman emperors lived were brought to light: the Domus Augustana, which was the private part of the palace with the Augustan's private apartments and baths, enlarged by Domitian. The only surviving structure of the Renaissance complex is a small lodge, called "Loggetta Mattei" or "Casina Farnese", that had housed the frescoes of Baldassarre Peruzzi, and a 19th-century structure built by the sisters of the Visitation that has become the seat of the Palatine Museum.

== See also ==
- List of archaeological sites by country#Italy
- Renaissance architecture
- Archaeological ethics
