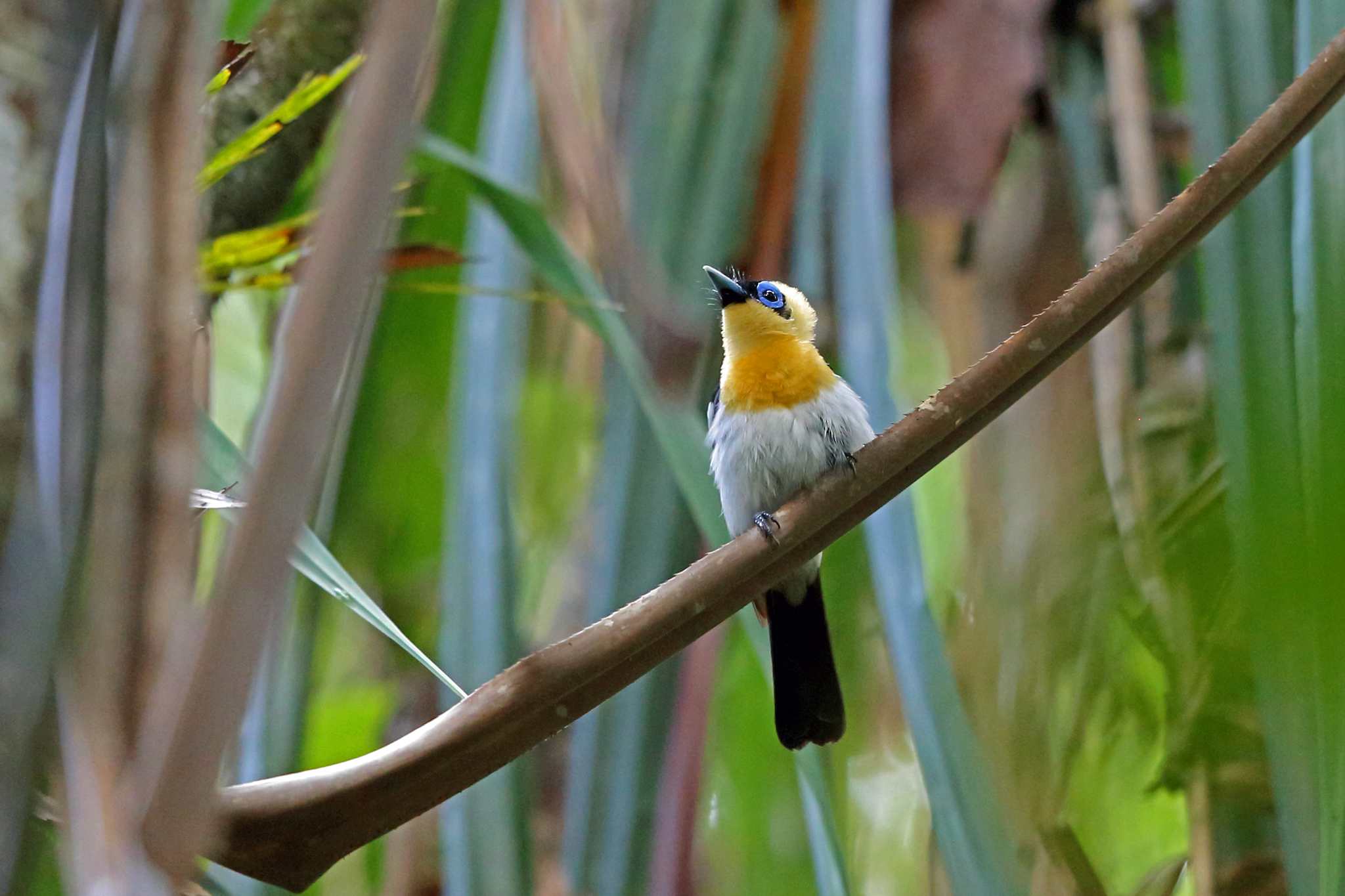

Conservation status
- Least Concern (IUCN 3.1)

Scientific classification
- Kingdom: Animalia
- Phylum: Chordata
- Class: Aves
- Order: Passeriformes
- Family: Monarchidae
- Genus: Arses
- Species: A. insularis

Binomial name
- Arses insularis (Meyer, AB, 1874)

Synonyms
- Arses telescophthalmus insularis; Monarcha insularis

= Ochre-collared monarch =

Species of bird

The ochre-collared monarch or rufous-collared monarch (Arses insularis) is a species of bird in the family Monarchidae. It is found in Yapen and northern New Guinea. Its natural habitats are subtropical or tropical moist lowland forests and subtropical or tropical moist montane forests.

== Taxonomy and systematics ==
This species was originally described in the genus Monarcha. Some authorities consider the ochre-collared monarch as a subspecies of the frilled monarch.
