= ARS (bodyboard) =

An ARS, which stands for Air - Roll - Spin, is a bodyboarding trick that combines an El Rollo with a 360° spin while the bodyboarder is in the air. The bodyboarder starts off by approaching the lip and doing the El Rollo, and during the rotation throws him/herself into a forward 360° spin. An Australian bodyboarder from Coffs Harbour Scott Mason invented and completed the first ARS. Which was known as a "Scroll" at the time in the early 90s. Then later made famous and renamed as the "ARS - Air Roll Spin" by Michael "EPPO" Epplestun, former world champion Australian Bodyboarder.

The move was revolutionary and ushered in a whole new gymnastic approach to riding a bodyboard, which morphed later to the Backflip.

Kelly Slater credits the Rodeo Clown move was adapted from the ARS.
