= Asshole (disambiguation) =

Asshole or arsehole is a vulgar term for the anus, or an insult derived from this meaning.

Asshole may also refer to:

- Asshole (album), by Gene Simmons
  - "Asshole", a song by Gene Simmons from his album, Asshole
- "Asshole" (song), by Denis Leary
- "Asshole", a song by Eminem from his album, The Marshall Mathers LP 2
- "Asshole", a song by Beck from his album, One Foot in the Grave
- "Asshole", a song by Ronnie Radke from his mixtape, Watch Me
- "Asshole", a song by Jim's Big Ego
- "The Asshole Song", a song by Three Dead Trolls in a Baggie
- Asshole (EP), an EP by Sebadoh
- Assholes: A Theory, a 2012 non-fiction book by Aaron James
  - Assholes: A Theory, a 2019 film directed by John Walker based on the book by Aaron James
- Asshole (card game)

== See also ==
- Arsole, arsenic-containing chemical compound
