= Petter chamor =

Mitzvah in Judaism

Halakhic texts relating to this article
- Torah: Exodus 13:13 and Exodus 34:20
- Babylonian Talmud: Bekhorot 5b
- Mishneh Torah: Hilchos Bikkurim 12:4

The Petter Chamor (Hebrew: פטר חמור) or Redemption of the firstborn, is a mitzvah in Judaism in which a male firstborn (bechor) donkey is redeemed by the owner of the donkey, who gives a lamb or kid to a Kohen. The lamb is not required to be firstborn.

The mitzvah applies to the firstborn male offspring of a Jewish-owned donkey. The donkey retains a level of holiness and is forbidden for work. The redemption transfers the holiness to another animal, such as a cow, goat or sheep, so that the donkey can be used for work. The other animal is then given to a Kohen who usually eats it. The ceremony is similar to the redemption of a firstborn male, a pidyon haben when a month-old male child is redeemed with silver coins given to a Kohen.

The mitzvah, albeit rare in modern times, is listed as an "obligation of the body" and thus applies in the diaspora as well as the Land of Israel.

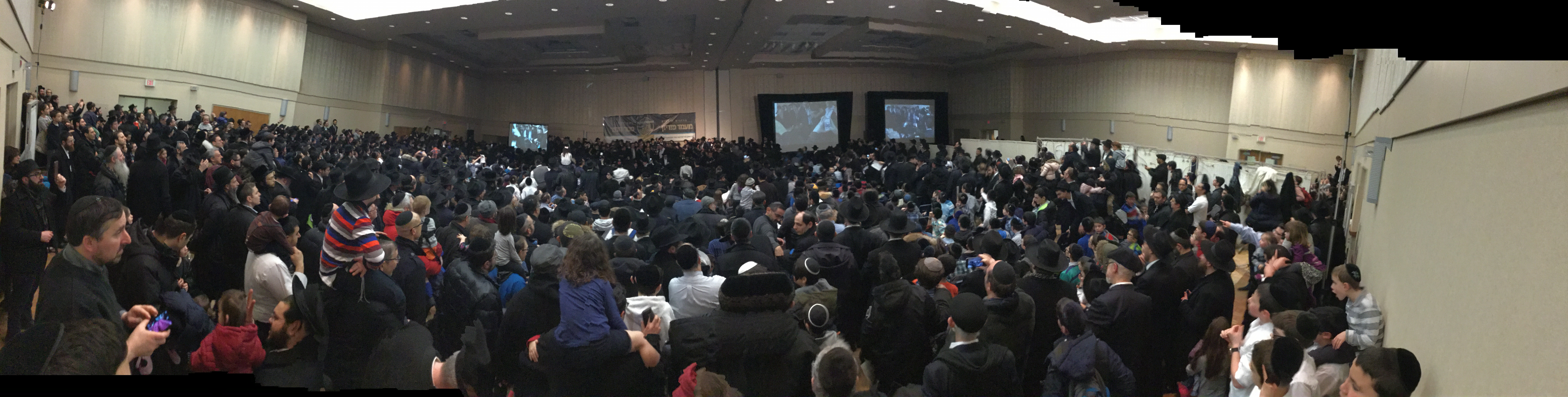
Men's section of a Petter Chamor in Toronto in 2017 with approximately 5000 participants.
