= Automobiles Sans Soupapes =

- Founded: March 1919; 107 years ago Lyon, France
- Founder: Bernard Verdy
- Defunct: March 1920; 106 years ago
- Fate: Merged with Société des Moteurs Thomas

Automobiles Sans Soupapes (ASS) (English: Automobiles Without Valves) was a French automobile manufacturer founded in 1919 by Bernard Verdy in Lyon, France. The company merged with Société des Moteurs Thomas in March 1920.

== Vehicle ==
Automobiles Sans Soupapes marketed their vehicle under the abbreviated name ASS and advertised it as L'automobile pour tous (The automobile for everyone), The car was powered by a 1240cc, 12 hp (8.9 kW) two-stroke Thomas engine and used a 2-speed epicyclic transmission. The car featured electric lights and starter. The vehicle was launched in March 1919 available in 4-door tourer and 2-door coupe variants at a cost of 4750 francs. Plans for mass production went unrealized, and in March 1920 it was announced that the company had merged with Société des Moteurs Thomas.
