= German submarine U-75 =

U-75 may refer to one of the following German submarines:

- SM U-75, a Type UE I submarine launched in 1915 and that served in World War I until sunk 13 December 1917; laid the mine that sank HMS Hampshire, killing Lord Kitchener
  - During World War I, Germany also had these submarines with similar names:
    - SM UB-75, a Type UB III submarine launched in 1917 and sunk on 10 December 1917
    - SM UC-75, a Type UC II submarine launched in 1916 and sunk 31 May 1918
- German submarine U-75 (1940), a Type VIIB submarine that served in World War II until sunk on 28 December 1941
