= El Rollo =

An El Rollo (Spanish for "The Roll") is a bodyboarding trick performed when the bodyboarder hits the lip of the wave and uses its power to throw himself out with the lip in a perfect arc to complete a roll before landing on the wave surface or into the white water. When the bodyboarder detaches completely from the wave surface or the lip, the trick is called an air roll or aerial roll. Other variations include the "barrel roll" where the roll is completed inside the barrel, and the "rollo takeoff" which is performed while catching the wave. This trick was named by someone in the industry. I remember the story where Pat Caldwell did the roll and Jack Lindholm or whoever saw him do it and commented "what do you call that an el rollo". Photos of the new move and captions started appearing in Bodyboarding Magazine. The move and the term caught on and spread around the world.

El Rollos are a staple move in the bodyboarding world and can look awesome in a range of different waves. Air rolls are a great move for riders that have mastered the drop in, bottom turning and trimming. Any bodyboarder with the above skills in the bag will naturally want to move quite literally upwards with their bodyboarding. Air rolls are the ideal entry move into the world of aerial bodyboarding!

The El Rollo was independently invented by bodyboarding legends Pat Caldwell and Mike Stewart.

== See also ==
- Bodyboarding
