= Peter Maser =

German protestant church historian (born 1943)

- Born: 3 August 1943 (age 83); Berlin, Germany
- Education: University of Halle
- Occupation: Protestant church historian
- Spouse: Malwine Maser
- Children: 2

Peter Maser (born 3 August 1943) is a German protestant church historian.

== Life ==
Peter Maser was born in Berlin at the height of the Second World War. He grew up at Bad Kösen in the Soviet occupation zone, relaunched in October 1949 as the Soviet sponsored German Democratic Republic (East Germany). His mother fled from Berlin during the closing months of the war in order to escape the bombardment of the city and he became separated from her. Identified as a war orphan he was adopted by Lorenz and Elisabeth-Charlotte Bertheau: their views in many ways provided the intellectual basis for his own adult life. Lorenz Bertheau (1886-1968) was a protestant pastor between 1925 and 1963 and during the Nazi years a member of the Confessing Church. He was driven by opposition to the idea of totalitarian government, and under the East German one-party regime was twice imprisoned. Peter Maser attended the local secondary school till 1957 and was then sent to the Landesschule Pforta, a former monastery in the hills between Erfurt and Leipzig, and in recent centuries chiefly notable as a prestigious German public boarding school for academically gifted children. However, he was excluded from the school "on political ground" after two years. He had organised a school visit to attend the Christmas Oratorio in nearby Naumburg Cathedral. In the context of the frequently tense relationship between church and state, this was seen as an inappropriate interpretation of his responsibilities as "Kulturbeauftragter" (loosely: student arts officer). He then attended a church "pre-seminary" in Naumburg until he was able to progress to university in 1962.

Between 1962 and 1968 Maser studied at the University of Halle, emerging with a degree in protestant theology. He stayed on, now working as a research assistant under Konrad Onasch, who supervised him for his doctorate which he received in 1971 or 1972. His doctoral dissertation was entitled "Zur Entstehung des Kreuzigungsbildes" ("On the origins of the crucifixion picture"). His habilitation (higher academic qualification) would follow only in 1988. He lost his place at Halle in 1976 after he applied for an Ausreiseantrag (permission permanently to leave the country).) By this time the state had clearly identified him as a potential or actual dissident. He himself later recalled that he was being monitored by six Stasi spies and his professional ambitions were being blocked. He was by now married to Malwine - like him, trained in theology - and the couple had two children, Jakob and Rebekka. The slaughter of war and massive emigration to the west during the early 1950s had left East Germany desperately short of working age population, but, slightly unusually, the Masers were permitted to relocate to the German Federal Republic (West Germany) without massive delay.

After relocating he became, in 1977, an academic researcher with the national "Churches Office" ("Kirchenamt") of the Evangelical Churches federation (EKD), based in Hanover. He also took a teaching post in Christian Archaeology and the History of Christian Art at the University of Münster. It was at Münster, in 1988, that he received his habilitation in church history. His appointment as an extraordinary professor for Church History and Christian Archaeology at the university faculty for Protestant Theology (Evangelische Theologie) followed in 1993. He remained at Münster till his retirement in 2008. Subsequently his retirement has turned out to be an active one.

The changes that opened the way for German reunification in 1990 provided new opportunities for Peter Maser to contribute to national life. He was appointed as the Theology expert in the parliamentary Commission set up to re-evaluate the History and Consequences of the Communist Dictatorship in [East] Germany ("Aufarbeitung von Geschichte und Folgen der SED-Diktatur in [Ost-]Deutschland"). He then served, between 1995 and 1998, as an expert (non-party) member of the follow-up parliamentary Commission mandated to "overcome the impact of the Communist Dictatorship on the implementation of German unity" ("Überwindung der Folgen der SED-Diktatur im Prozeß der deutschen Einheit"). In 1998 he joined the Board of Trustees for the National Archives' Foundation for Political Parties and Mass Organisations in the German Democratic Republic ("Stiftung Archiv der Parteien und Massenorganisationen der DDR im Bundesarchiv" / SAPMO). Since 2013 he has chaired the Advisory Board of the Ettersberg Foundation and been a member of the 24 person advisory board for the "Luther Decade" project. His qualifications for this last appointment can be seen to have dated back to 1983, which, being the five hundredth anniversary of the great reformer's birth, was designated "Luther Year" in the German Democratic Republic. Maser's contribution to the celebration in 1983 had been his challenging book, "Mit Martin Luther alles in Butter?".

== Honour ==
In June 1998 Maser was awarded the Order of Merit of the Federal Republic of Germany 1st Class.
