= Party of Donkeys =

Fictitious political party in Iran

- Founder: Towfigh Brothers
- Founded: 1963
- Dissolved: 1971
- Headquarters: Tehran, Lalezar Street, Iran
- Newspaper: Towfigh Magazine
- Ideology: Satire
- Colors: Green Alfalfa Sprouts
- Slogan: Persian: گاوان و خران باربردار، به زآدمیان مردم‌آزار, lit. 'Oxen and donkeys that carry loads, Are better than people who torment their fellows'

Party of Donkeys or Donkeys' Party (Persian: حزب خران, romanized: Ḥezb-e Ḵarān; Donkey is the epitome of docile imbecility) was a fictitious political party in Iran. It was founded in 1963, when the New Iran Party vs. the People's Party rivalry was shaped. The party had members with green membership cards and held gatherings. The party was a critique of the lack of popularity of the corrupt two-party system of Iran during the reign of the Shah and in fact drew more members than the actual government-created political parties. The Persian word for donkey is "khar" which translates in English to "idiot". A committee was established to vet membership whereby each member had to provide evidence of an act of idiocy that they had committed. No politicians or members of the Royal Court were allowed to join the Donkey's Party.

"Donkeys of Iran and the World Unite! Create a world in which donkeys can live in comfort. Support the creation of a Bank of Hay. Oppose and end all donkey-like despotism. Create an atmosphere in which every donkey can freely bray", was among the principles declared by the party.
