= Ars (magazine) =

Montenegrin journal

Ars (from the Latin for "art") is a Montenegrin monthly cultural and political magazine, that identifies as a journal of literature, culture and social affairs.

It started out in 1986 in Cetinje (then part of SR Montenegro, Yugoslavia). One of the founders and first editors of the magazine was Slavko Perović, later a leader of the liberals and anti-war movement in the Republic of Montenegro during the Yugoslav Wars.

The magazine is currently published by a cultural non-governmental organization called Open Cultural Forum (Otvoreni kulturni forum, OKF) based in Cetinje, Montenegro.
