= The Messiah's Donkey =

Steed of the Messiah at the end of days

In Jewish and Christian tradition, the Messiah's Donkey (Hebrew: חמורו של משיח) refers to the donkey upon which the Messiah will arrive (Judaism) or arrived (Christianity) to redeem the world. In Modern Hebrew the phrase "the Messiah's donkey" is used to refer to someone who does the 'dirty work' on behalf of someone else.

== In Jewish tradition ==
The origin of the belief can be found in Zechariah 9:9: "... your king is coming to you; righteous and having salvation is he, humble and mounted on a donkey, on a colt, the foal of a donkey." The 'king' mentioned in this verse is interpreted by Chazal as referring to the Messiah.

In the discussion regarding this verse in the Babylonian Talmud (Sanhedrin 98a), a story is told of the Persian king Shevor, who says to Samuel, one of the Amoraim, "You say that the Messiah will come on a donkey; I will send him the riding horse that I have." In response to the ridicule of the king, Samuel answers, "Do you have a horse with one thousand colors like the donkey of the Messiah? Certainly his donkey will be miraculous."

== In Christian tradition ==
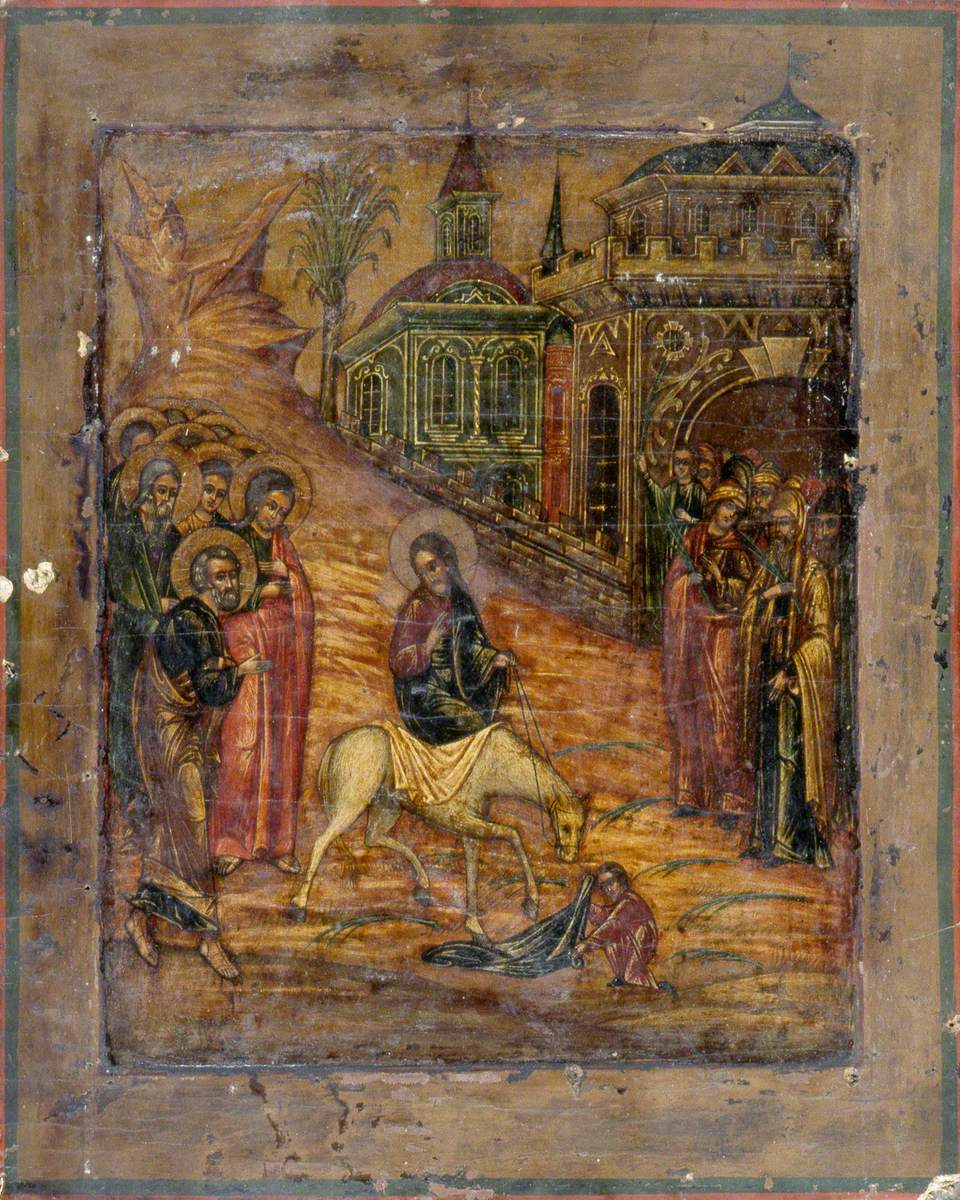
Christ's entry into Jerusalem, icon of the Russian school

The triumphal entry into Jerusalem is a narrative in the four canonical Gospels describing the arrival of Jesus Christ in Jerusalem a few days before his crucifixion. This entry into Jerusalem is celebrated each year by Christianity in the liturgy of Palm Sunday.

In the New Testament (Matthew 21:1–11, Mark 11:1–11, Luke 19:28–44 and John 12:12–19), it is told that as Jesus approached the Mount of Olives, he sent two of his disciples to a nearby village to fetch him a donkey, or exactly an Onager or wild donkey. Upon their return, Jesus rode the donkey into Jerusalem, where he was met by cheering crowds. He arrived in Jerusalem to celebrate Passover, entering the city riding a donkey. He was greeted by a crowd acclaiming him by waving palm branches and laying cloaks on the ground to honor him. This episode introduces the events of the Passion of Jesus, leading to his crucifixion and resurrection. According to the Christian tradition, this was the fulfillment of the prophecy of Zechariah 9:9: "Rejoice greatly, O daughter of Zion! Shout aloud, O daughter of Jerusalem! Behold, your king is coming to you; righteous and having salvation is he, humble and mounted on a donkey, on a colt, the foal of a donkey." In Christian iconography the donkey is usually white.

== Modern references ==
In Israel, the phrase "the Messiah's Donkey" can also refer to the controversial political-religious doctrine ascribed to the teachings of Avraham Yitzhak Kook which claims that secular Jews, which represent the material world, are an instrument in the hands of God whose purpose it was to establish the State of Israel and begin the process of redemption, but upon its establishment they would be required to step aside and allow the Religious-Haredi public to govern the state. According to this analogy, the secular Jewish public are the "donkey", while the Religious-Haredi public who would take their place represent a collective quasi-Messianic body. A book called The Messiah's Donkey, which focuses on this issue, was published in 1998 by Seffi Rachlevsky and caused widespread controversy among the Jewish public; according to Hassidic teaching the donkey is a symbol of the fact that the Messiah and Messianic age will not oppose the material world, but rather control it for sacred purposes. Thus, the act of riding upon the donkey is a symbol of the sovereignty of the Messiah over the material world (represented by the donkey).

In his memoir Three Worlds, Avi Shlaim recounts that Muslim friends of the family once asked his mother's maternal uncle if it was true that when the Messiah arrives, Muslims will become donkeys and Jews will ride upon them, and if so, would they choose Sunni or Shi'a donkeys. The uncle sidestepped the point by remarking: "when the Messiah came, there would be utter pandemonium and the Jews would jump on the first donkey that came their way without checking out its sect!"
