= Juan Bautista Avalle-Arce =

Juan Bautista Avalle-Arce (13 May 1927 – 25 December 2009) was an Argentine Hispanist.

Bautista Avalle-Arce was born in Buenos Aires, Argentina, to a family with Galician and Basque roots. He was educated in St. Andrews, a Scottish boarding school. Juan Bautista Avalle-Arce met Amado Alonso upon returning to Argentina, and followed him to Harvard University, obtaining a doctorate in 1955. Though he sought to return to his parents' homeland, the Francoist government did not acknowledge doctorates earned abroad. As such, Bautista Avalle-Arce began teaching in the United States. Despite spending five decades in the United States, he never sought US citizenship. Over the course of his career, Bautista Avalle-Arce taught at Smith College, Ohio State University, the University of North Carolina at Chapel Hill, and the University of California, Santa Barbara, where he was Jose Miguel Barandiaran Professor of Basque Studies. In 1960, Bautista Avalle-Arce was awarded a Guggenheim fellowship. After retiring in 2003, he moved to Eneriz. Bautista Avalle-Arce died on December 25, 2009, at the University Hospital of Navarre.
