= Autonomous Rotorcraft Sniper System =

The Autonomous Rotorcraft Sniper System (ARSS) was an experimental robotic weapons system that was in development by the U.S. Army since 2005, but no information about the status of the system has been made public since 2010.

The ARSS consisted of a remotely operated sniper rifle attached to an unmanned autonomous helicopter. It was intended for use in urban combat or for several other missions requiring snipers. Flight tests were scheduled to begin in Summer 2009.

The rifle, a semiautomatic RND Manufacturing Edge 2000 firing the .338 Lapua Magnum cartridge, was mounted on a stabilized platform, which was attached to the underside of a Vigilante 502 UAV. The helicopter was to be flown by an autopilot while a human controller aims and fires the rifle, which may fire up to ten well-aimed shots per minute. The rifle platform, called the Precision Weapons Platform (PWP), was designed by Utah State University’s Space Dynamics Laboratory and was equipped with a situational awareness camera and a two-level zoom scope.

The system as a whole was being developed under the Army's Aviation Applied Technology Directorate in the course of its Aerial Delivery of Effects from Lightweight Aircraft (ADELA) program. It used much commercial off–the–shelf hardware to reduce cost and development time. For instance, the system was controlled using an Xbox 360 video game controller.

Other weapons considered for use with the ARSS included the M249 or M240 machine guns, the AA-12 shotgun or non-lethal weapons. The ARSS hardware could also be installed on fixed-wing UAVs or ground combat robots. The Lockheed Martin One Shot sniper system was being considered for addition to ARSS.
