= Arce, Spain =

Town in northern Spain

Coordinates: 42.9214°N 1.38389°W

Arce's flag

Arce's coat of arms

Arce (Basque: Artzi) is a town located in the province of Navarre, in the autonomous community of Navarre, northern Spain.
