= Onolatry =

Ancient worship of donkeys

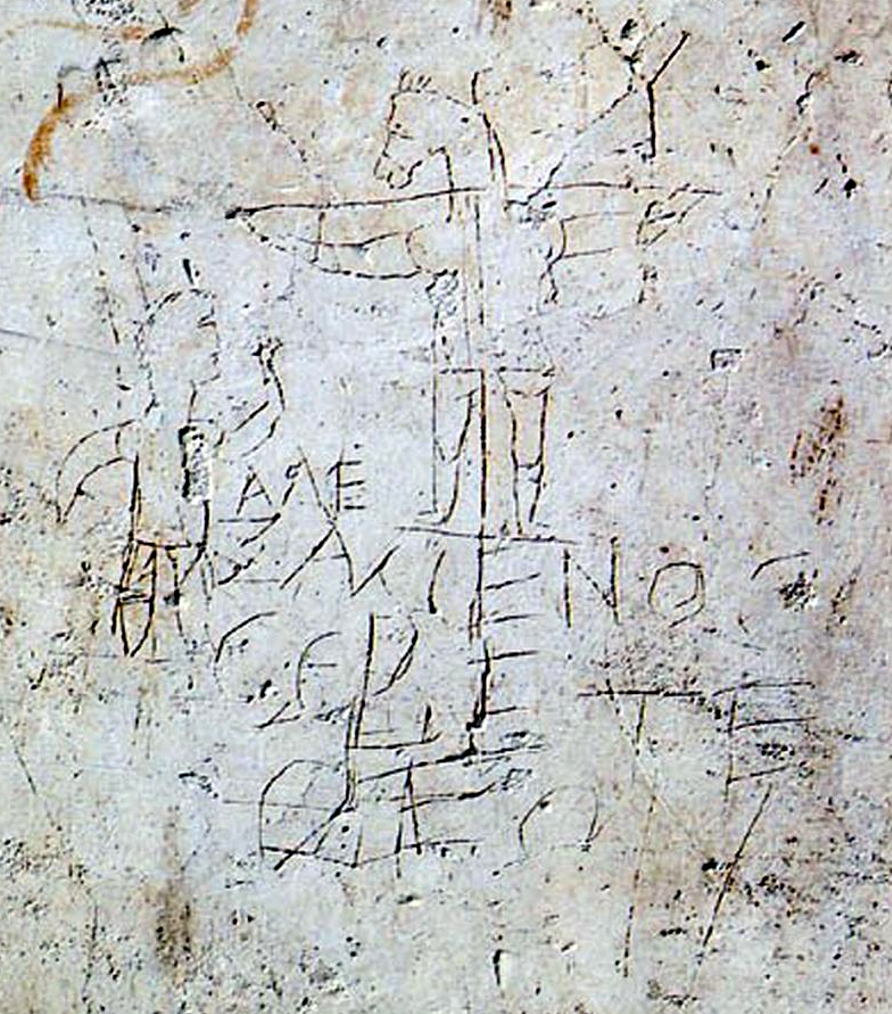
2nd-3rd Century CE, the satirical Alexamenos graffito

Onolatry is the supposed worship of the donkey during antiquity. In Imperial Rome, the charge of onolatry was used as a polemic against Jews and Jewish Christians. The association of Jews with donkeys was a common feature of Hellenic as well as Latin ethnographic and historical writings, and included accusations of worshipping a golden donkey head and even sacrificing foreigners to it at intervals.

The charge was likely first used against Jews in Egypt, where donkeys were at some points associated with Set, the murderer of Osiris who is in turn destroyed by Isis. The Egyptian and Greek Alexandrians would equate the Judahite deity Yahweh as being Set/Typhon, a chaotic god of the deserts, storms and violence. It is first attested in the second century BCE, and was used against Christians extensively in the first and second centuries CE before disappearing almost entirely in the third. The accusation against the Jews is discussed by Josephus in his Against Apion II.7. As well as those targeted at Christians being addressed by Tertullian and Minucius Felix, among other early Christian apologists. A famous example of this is the Alexamenos graffito, showing a crucified man with the head of a donkey.

Arthur Bernard Cook, in an 1894 article, argued that there had been an ancient Mycenaean cult practising onolatry, citing a fresco depicting donkey-headed figures found near a sacrificial pit and several carved gems apparently showing people wearing donkeys' heads and skins holding sacrificial objects, and further describing the diverse roles asses played in Ancient Greek mythology. His interpretation was challenged at the time by Andrew Lang in Longman's Magazine.

== See also ==
- Alexamenos graffito
- Animal worship
- Cultural references to donkeys
- History of early Christianity
- Yaldabaoth
