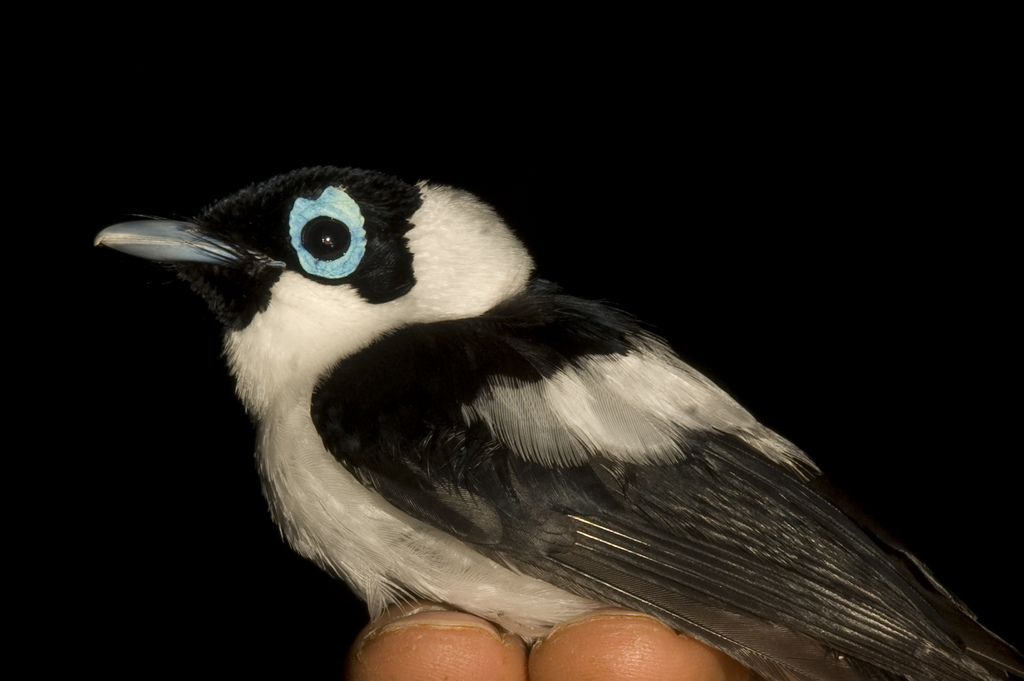
- Frill-necked monarch, Arses lorealis

Scientific classification
- Kingdom: Animalia
- Phylum: Chordata
- Class: Aves
- Order: Passeriformes
- Family: Monarchidae
- Genus: Arses; Lesson, 1831

Type species
- Muscicapa telescophthalmus Lesson & Garnot, 1827

Species
- see text

= Arses (bird) =

Genus of birds

Arses is a genus of monarch flycatchers in the family Monarchidae. The genus is restricted to forest and second growth on the island of New Guinea, a few surrounding islands and northern Queensland, Australia. The genus is separated by their frilled necks, fleshy blue eye wattles and delicate pendent nests. They also have a distinctive foraging technique, hopping up tree trunks in a spiral fashion.

== Taxonomy ==
The genus Arses was introduced by the French naturalist René Lesson in 1831. The type species was subsequently designated as the frilled monarch (Arses telescopthalmus) by English zoologist George Robert Gray in 1840. The genus name is from the Persian king Arses who ruled from 338 until 336 BC.

The genus contains four species:

Image	Common name	Scientific name	Distribution
	Ochre-collared monarch	Arses insularis	northern New Guinea.
	Frilled monarch	Arses telescopthalmus	New Guinea.
	Frill-necked monarch	Arses lorealis	northern Cape York Peninsula in Australia.
	Pied monarch	Arses kaupi	Queensland in Australia.
