= Jackass Aeropark =

- IATA: none; ICAO: none; FAA LID: U75

Summary
- Airport type: Public
- Location: Amargosa Valley, Nevada
- Elevation AMSL: 2,640 ft / 804.7 m
- Coordinates: 36°38′04″N 116°24′48″W
- Interactive map of Jackass Aeropark

Runways
Direction	Length		Surface
Direction	ft	m	Surface
14/32	6,200	1,890	Dirt
- Sources: FAA and Nevada DOT

Jackass Aeropark (FAA LID: U75) was a public-use airport located in Amargosa Valley, Nevada. It was named after Jackass Flats, Nevada, where wild jackasses once gathered to graze on the Nevada Test Site.

== History ==
The airfield was opened in 1949 as Lathrop Wells Airport (IATA: LTH) with an unpaved 4,700-foot (1,433 m) runway. In 1957 the runway was 5,000 feet (1,524 m) and by 1959 the airport was closed. It reopened in 1964 as Jackass Aeropark with an unpaved 6,200-foot (1,890 m) runway built to the west of the former airstrip. The airport was owned by the U.S. Bureau of Land Management. It was deactivated by the Federal Aviation Administration on May 18, 2004.

== Facilities and aircraft ==
Jackass Aeropark resided an elevation of 2,640 ft (805 m) above mean sea level. It contained one runway designated 14/32 with a dirt surface measuring 6,200 by 100 ft (1,890 by 30 m). The airport had an average of 50 aircraft operations per month: 83% transient general aviation, 17% local general aviation and <1% military aviation. A 2003 Nevada DOT airport diagram showed a 2,200-by-50-foot (671 m × 15 m) taxiway and a 250-by-250-foot (76 m × 76 m) apron with a hangar and 8 covered tie-downs.
