= Regio X Palatium =

Historical region of Rome

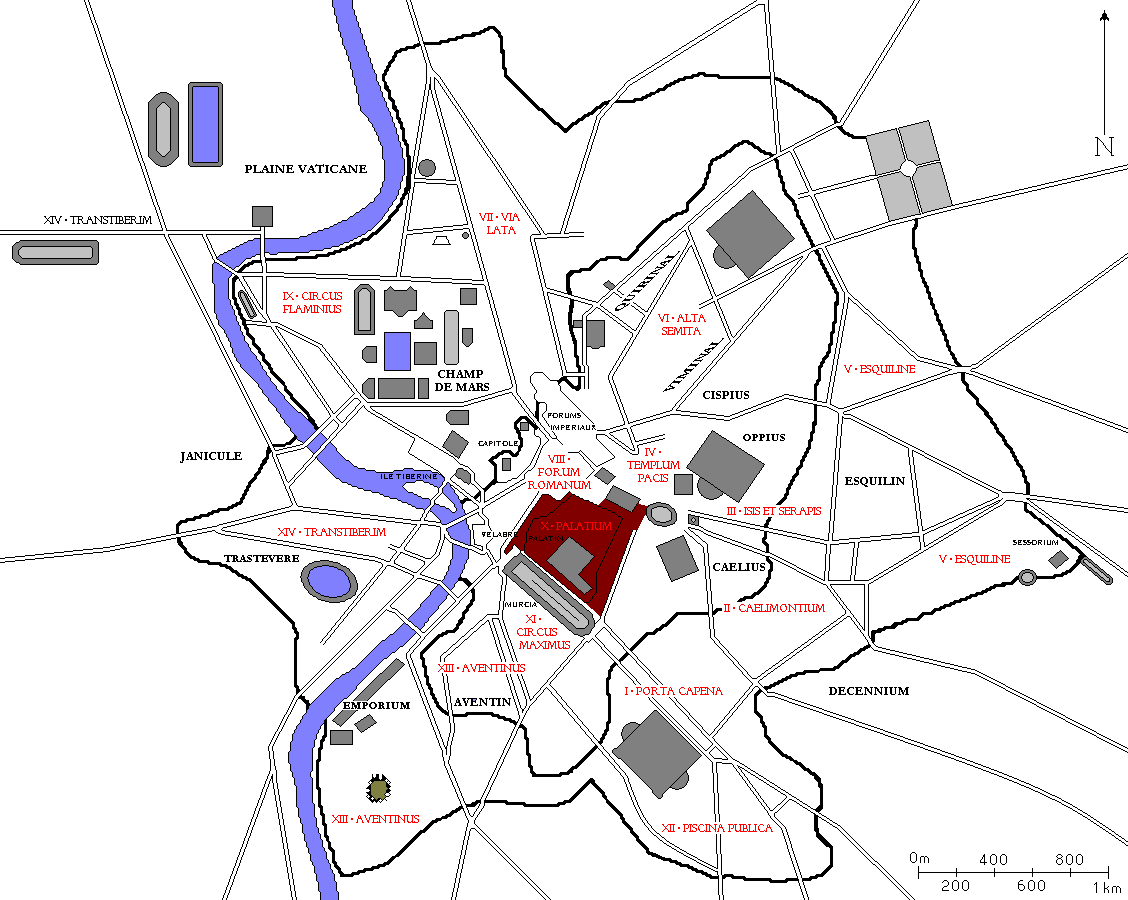

The Regio X Palatium is the tenth regio of imperial Rome, under Augustus's administrative reform. Regio X took its name from the Palatine Hill and the imperial palaces located on it.

== Geographic extent and important features ==
Regio X was centred on the Palatine Hill. In extent, the region largely followed the contours of the Palatine, and so was bordered by the Velabrum on the north west, the Circus Maximus to the south west, the Via Sacra on the north east, and on the south east, a street where the modern Via di San Gregorio is now situated. A measurement taken at the end of the 4th century recorded that the perimeter of the region was 11,510 Roman feet (approximately 3.4 km), making it the second smallest of the Augustan regions.

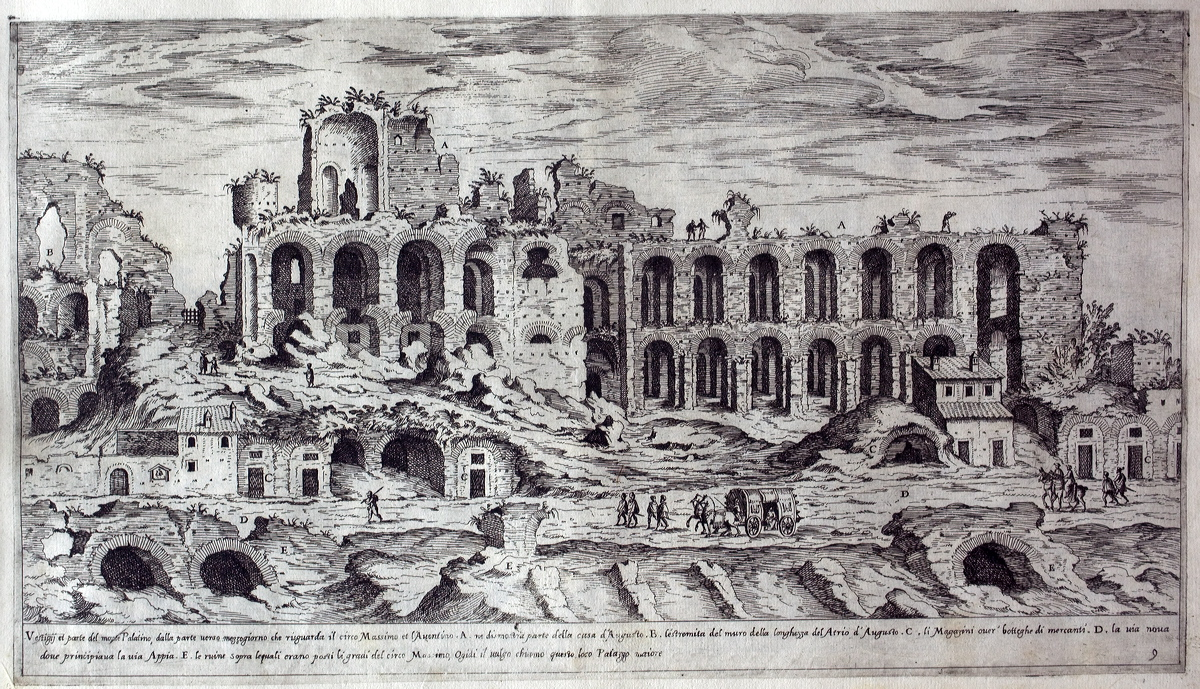
Drawing of the ruins of the Domus Augustana on the Palatine (1575)

The hill itself is dominated by a series of imperial palaces, which were the residences of the emperors and their families whilst they were lodged in the city. The most prominent of these was the vast Palace of Domitian, with its three principal wings: the Domus Augustana, the Domus Flavia, and the Hippodrome of Domitian (in reality, a private sunken garden). Earlier palaces had been created by the emperors Augustus (the Domus Augusti) and Tiberius (the Domus Tiberiana), both of which were preserved by later emperors. Later, the Domus Severiana was added by the emperor Septimius Severus, who also constructed the Septizodium (or the Temple of the Seven Suns) adjacent to it.

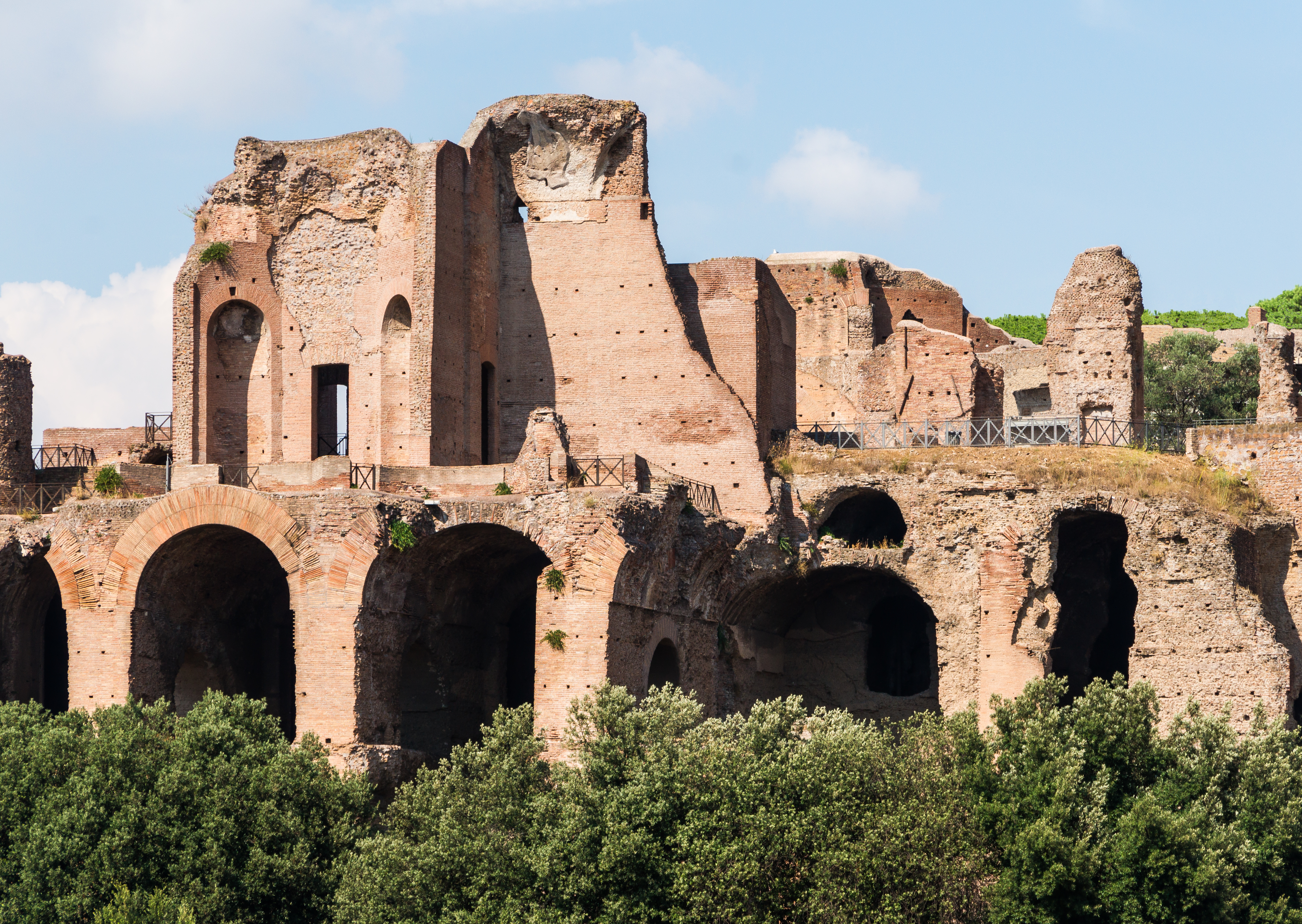
The ruins of the Domus Augustana on the Palatine

The hill also possessed several other temples. First was the Temple of Apollo Palatinus, built by Augustus, to which was attached a library (the Bibliotheca Apollinis). The Temple of Apollo was situated next to the much older Temple of Magna Mater. Also here, according to the 5th century Notitia, was the Temple of Jupiter Victor, which is assumed to have been situated near the entrance of Domitian's Palace.

This region also contained a number of sites that dated back to Rome's mythical past. Chief amongst these was the Casa Romuli (or House of Romulus, the legendary founder of Rome). Also here was the Lupercal, reputedly where the twin boys (Romulus and Remus) were suckled by a she-wolf and where the Lupercalia festivities were held, as well as the Roma quadrata. Finally, at its northwestern end, the region contained the still intact Arch of Titus, the now ruined Baths of Elagabalus and the Arch of Constantine, where it terminated. At the turn of the 5th century, the Regio contained 20 aediculae (shrines), 89 domūs (patrician houses), 48 horrea (warehouses), 44 balneae (bath houses) and 89 loci (fountains).

== Subdivisions ==
At the turn of the 5th century, the Regio was divided into 20 vici (districts) and 2,642 insulae (blocks). It had two curators and was served by 48 Roman magistrates.
