= House of Augustus =

Ancient domus in Rome

- Domus Augusti (Latin)
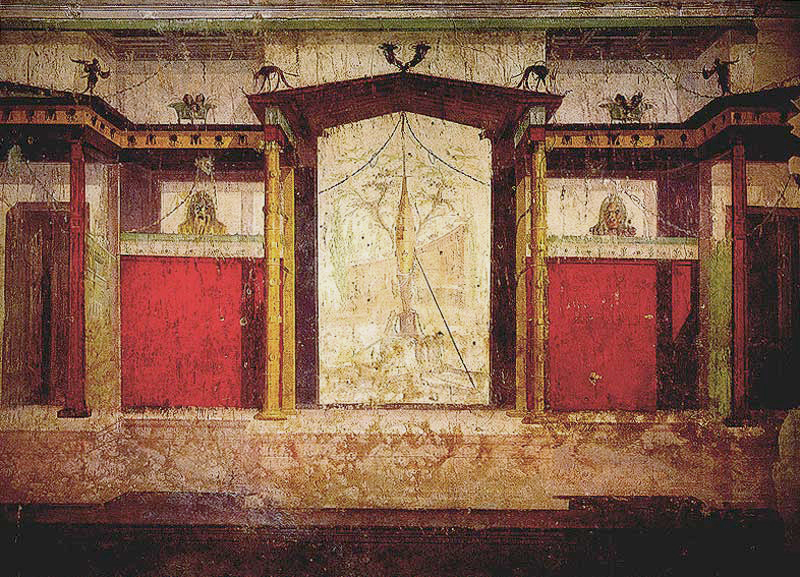
- Fresco in the House of Augustus

- Shown within Augustan Rome
- Interactive map of House of Augustus
- 41°53′20″N 12°29′07″E
- Type: Domus
- Location: Regio X Palatium

The House of Augustus, or the Domus Augusti (not to be confused with the Domus Augustana), is situated on the Palatine Hill in Rome, Italy. A house on the southwestern corner of the Palatine has been identified, though not without dispute, as the primary place of residence for the emperor Augustus (r. 27 BC – AD 14).

The Domus Augusti is located near the so-called Hut of Romulus and other sites that have connections to the foundation of Rome. The location of the Flavian-era Domus Augustana has also been identified as that of the house of Augustus.

== Augustus's Palatine house in literary sources ==
Augustus had multiple houses, though the most famous one is that on the Palatine. He moved there from his original home close to the Forum. The house was a relatively simple home: its porticoes used peperino stone and its reception rooms refrained from marble veneers or decorative flooring. It was originally owned by the orator Quintus Hortensius and was adjacent to the Apolline temple on the Palatine and the house that had belonged to Quintus Lutatius Catulus, which it later incorporated. Velleius Paterculus reports that the purchase occurred around 41–40 BC.

Soon after, this spot was struck by lightning, and so Augustus declared it a public property and dedicated a temple to Apollo Palatinus, as Apollo had helped Augustus in his victory over Sextus Pompey in 36 BC. Because of this "pious act" the Senate decreed that the property around this area should be given to Augustus from public funds. An oak crown said to have adorned the front door was a tribute to this senatorial dedication in 27 BC. The house also contained a tower which Augustus called a technyphion ("little workshop") that served as his personal study, and a small altar to Vesta.

The house was permanently destroyed in the AD 64 fire which consumed much of the Palatine Hill, but had previously burnt around AD 3 before being rebuilt at public expense.

== Carettoni house ==
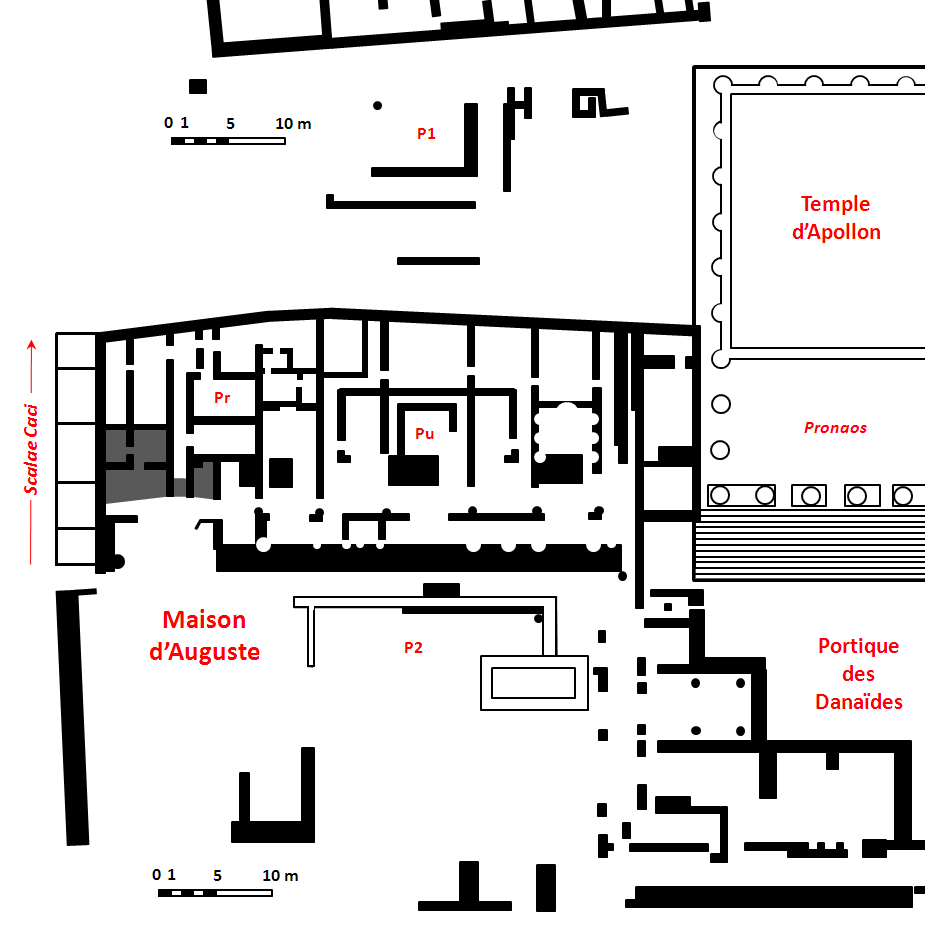
A portion of the Carettoni house located to the west of the Temple of Apollo on the Palatine.

A specific house on the southwestern portion of the Palatine Hill is now traditionally attributed to Augustus and customarily called the domus Augusti. Whether this was in fact the first emperor's house is disputed. This article refers to that house, therefore, as the "Carettoni house".

In 1865, Pietro Rosa began excavations at the so-called House of Livia. His excavations, part of a larger program commissioned by Napoleon III, included a superficial excavation of a house, located to the south. In 1937, Alfonso Bartoli did further surveys of the area and found archaeological remnants of collapsed vaults. In 1956, extensive excavations began under Gianfilippo Carettoni. His initial excavations revealed a structure, consisting of a set of rooms, which has now been identified as part of a larger complex known as Peristyle A. He attributed this structure to Augustus based on its proximity to the nearby Temple of Apollo Palatinus.

In the first decade of the 2000s further work revealed that the original peristyle was part of a much larger house. A restoration program was completed in 2008, giving the public access.

The plan of the site is based on two peristyles bordered by rooms. Between each peristyle sits the Temple of Apollo Palatinus. Most of the remains are around Peristyle A (P2), as much of Peristyle B (P1) was destroyed by the later Palace of Domitian. This entire site occupies c. 8,600 square metres (93,000 sq ft).

The house was built on two terraces.

=== Domicile ===
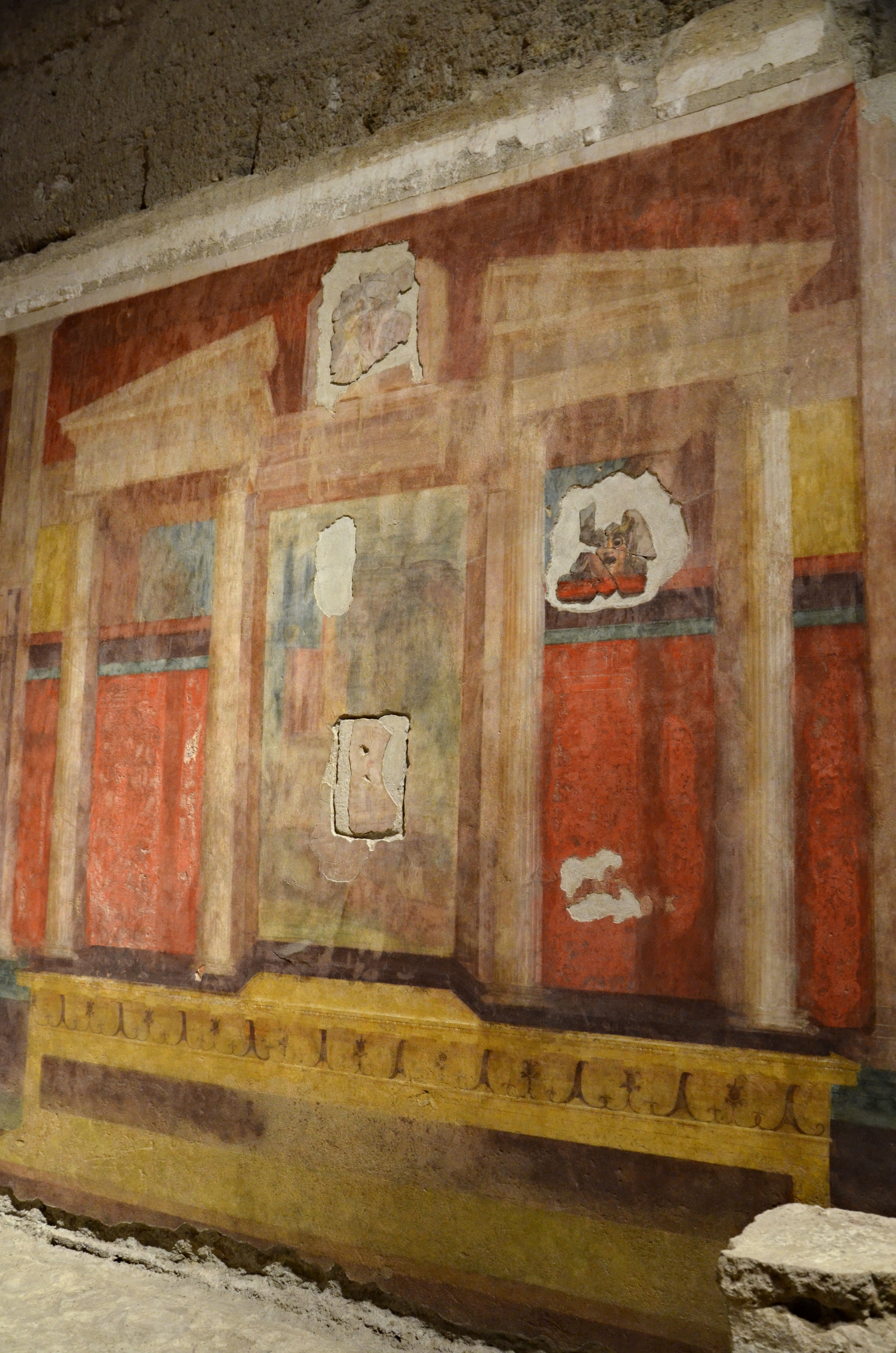
South wall of the "Large oecus" with architectural wall painting of the Second Pompeian Style, House of Augustus, Palatine Hill, Rome

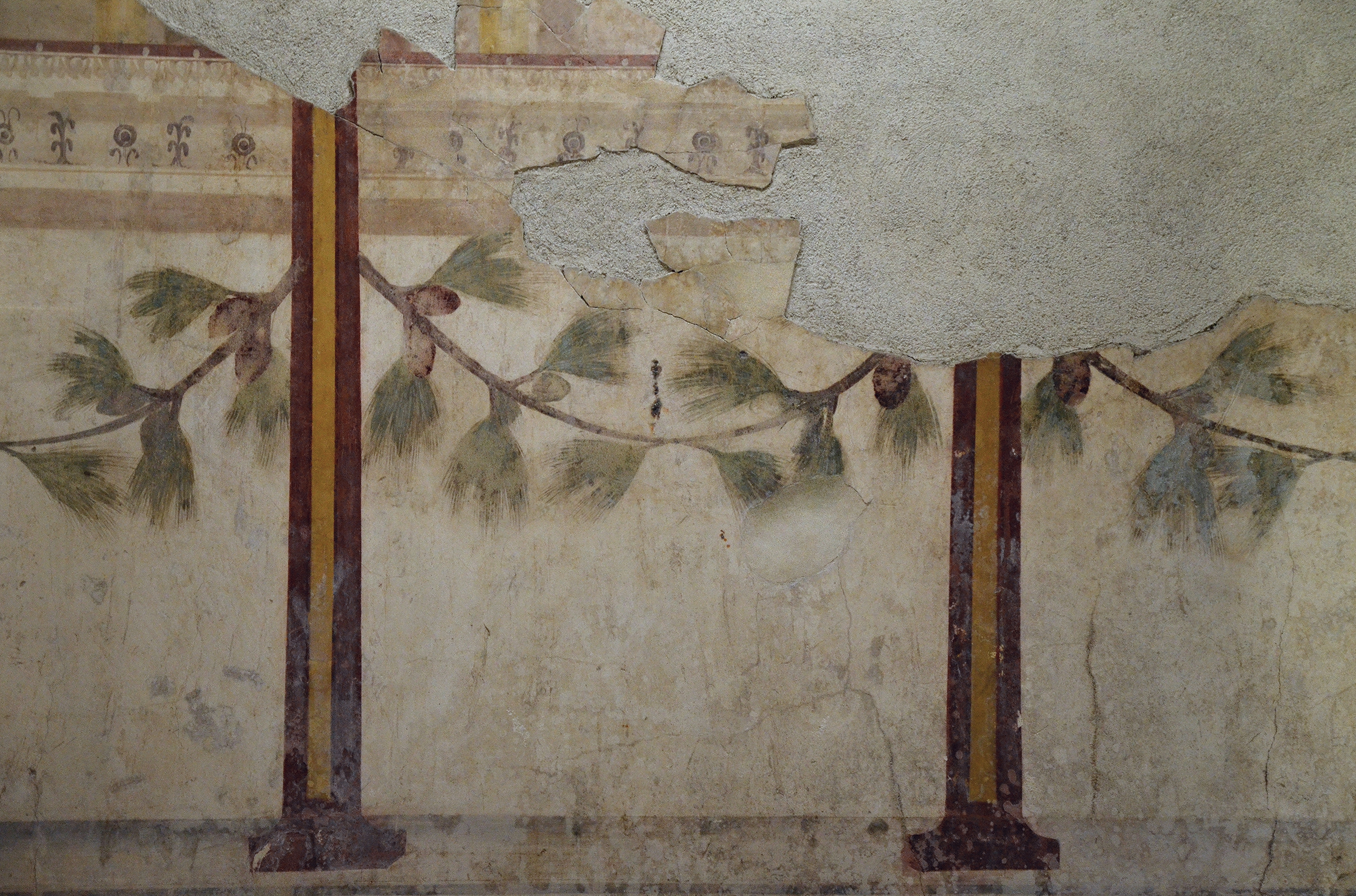
Room of the Pine Festoon, House of Augustus, Palatine Hill, Rome

The house encompasses the northern rooms on Peristyle A.

After building the Temple of Apollo Palatinus, Augustus destroyed some of the rooms and reconfigured the villa, building a large Peristyle A and rooms over the original house.

The visible structure consists of two rows of rooms built in opus quadratum, divided into eastern and western sections. The rooms to the western side of this complex may have been the private living quarters and have extensive wall decorations. One room, known as the Room of the Masks, features perspective architectural paintings and theatrical masks, typical of the Second Style of Roman wall painting. Another room features paintings of decorative pine branches, very similar to the House of Livia. These two rooms date to 30 BC.

The eastern rooms encircled a large central room, which was open toward the south and perhaps served a public function. These rooms were decorated with geometric floor mosaics.

=== Peristyle A (P2) ===
This peristyle sits just west of the Temple of Apollo. It dates to approximately 39 BC and has been identified as the private quarters of the villa. Little archaeological evidence remains, with the exception of a portion of the tufa peristyle.

=== Peristyle B (P1) ===
Peristyle B lies in a symmetrical position across on the other side of the Temple of Apollo Palatinus and was constructed between 39 and 36 BC. It perhaps served a public function. However, the Palace of Domitian (Domus Augustana) has disturbed much of this area, which is possibly how the Domus Augustana received its name.

=== Temple of Apollo Palatinus ===
Initially identified as the Temple of Jupiter Victor, the Temple of Apollo Palatinus is located between both peristyles, on a higher terrace. It was finished in 28 BC, confirmed by the findings of Republican houses underneath it. The podium was 24 m by 45 m, and the temple featured barrel vaults and Corinthian capitals. Built of Luna marble and concrete, it housed the cult statues of Apollo, Diana and Latona, in addition to the Sibylline books.

== Issues of identification ==
Literary accounts from Velleius Paterculus and Cassius Dio offer evidence of the location of Augustus' house next to the Apolline temple on the Palatine. Suetonius also wrote:

He lived at first near the Forum Romanum, afterwards on the Palatine in a modest dwelling remarkable neither for size or elegance, having but a short colonnade with columns of local stone and rooms without any marble decorations or handsome pavements. For more than 40 years he used the same bedroom in winter and summer.

These literary accounts have ignited debates over the identification of this monument in recent years, and have called into question the identification of this complex as the House of Augustus. Since recent excavation has revealed a very large villa plan, some are inclined to doubt the statement of Suetonius. This doubt is reinforced by the fact that Suetonius is known to have included rumors and literary embellishment in his biographical accounts, in order to characterize emperors in a certain light. Others have instead suggested that this villa would have been too luxurious and large to be the House of Augustus that is described in the literary sources. More recent scholarship has seen wider agreement that the Carettoni house is not the House of Augustus.

The Carettoni house was destroyed before its completion to construct the Apolline temple complex. Moreover, archaeological evidence under the domus Augustiana to the east indicate activities of Augustus' freedmen at that location, suggesting that Augustus' house was actually there; it would have been destroyed by the fire in AD 64 before the basements were incorporated into the Flavian structure.

== See also ==
Media related to Domus Augusti (Rome) at Wikimedia Commons

- List of ancient monuments in Rome

== Bibliography ==
=== Modern sources ===
- Carandini, Andrea; Bruno, Daniela (2008). La casa di Augusto: dai "Lupercalia" al Natale. Editori Laterza. ISBN 978-88-420-8641-3. OCLC 262536681.
- Coarelli, Filippo; Clauss, James J; Harmon, Daniel P; Clauss, J Anthony; Mackay, Pierre A (2014). Rome and environs: an archaeological guide (1st ed.). University of California Press. ISBN 978-0-520-28209-4. JSTOR 10.1525/j.ctt5vk043.
- Hall, Jonathan M (2014). Artifact and artifice: classical archaeology and the ancient historian. University of Chicago Press. ISBN 978-0-226-31338-2. LCCN 2013-018750.
- Iacopi, Irene; Tedone, Giovanna (2006). "Bibliotheca e Porticus ad Apollinis". Mitteilungen des Deutschen Archäologischen Instituts, Römische Abteilung. 112: 351–378.
- Platts, Hannah (2018). "The development and role of the Roman aristocratic domus". In Holleran, Claire; Claridge, Amanda (eds.). A companion to the city of Rome. Wiley Blackwell. pp. 299–316. ISBN 978-1-118-30069-5. LCCN 2018-001005.
- Richardson, Lawrence (1992). A new topographical dictionary of ancient Rome. Baltimore: Johns Hopkins University Press. ISBN 0-8018-4300-6. LCCN 91-45046.
- Wiseman, T Peter (2012). "Where did they live (eg Cicero, Octavius, Augustus)?". Journal of Roman Archaeology. 25: 657–672. doi:10.1017/S1047759400001562. ISSN 1047-7594.
- Wiseman, T Peter (2019). The house of Augustus: a historical detective story. Princeton University Press. doi:10.2307/j.ctvc77f88. ISBN 978-0-691-18007-6. JSTOR j.ctvc77f88.
- Wiseman, T Peter (2014). "Archaeology and history: the house of Augustus". Journal of Roman Archaeology. 27: 544–551. doi:10.1017/S1047759414001494. ISSN 1047-7594.
- Wiseman, T Peter (2022). "Palace-sanctuary or pavilion? Augustus' house and the limits of archaeology". Papers of the British School at Rome. 90: 9–34. doi:10.1017/S0068246221000295. ISSN 0068-2462.

=== Ancient sources ===
- Dio. Roman history.
- Suetonius. "Life of Augustus". The twelve Caesars.
- Velleius Paterculus. History of Rome.

Preceded by Flavian Palace	Landmarks of Rome; House of Augustus	Succeeded by Palace of Domitian
