= Flavian Palace =

Palace on the Palatine Hill in Rome, Italy

Domus Flavia
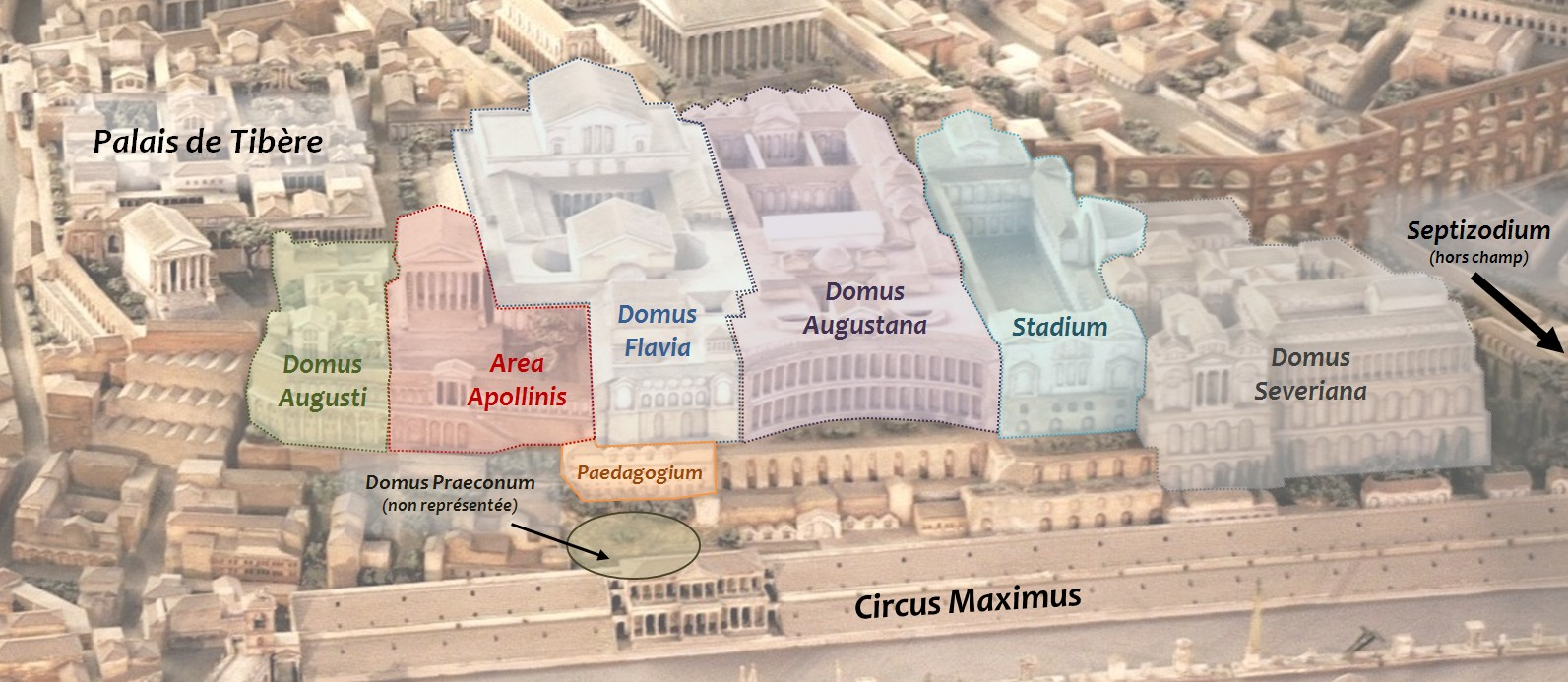
- Domus Flavia on the Palatine

- Shown within Augustan Rome
- Interactive map of Domus Flavia
- 41°53′N 12°29′E
- Type: Domus
- Location: Regio X Palatium

History
- Built: AD 92
- Built by: Domitian

The Flavian Palace, commonly known as the Domus Flavia, forms part of the extensive Palace of Domitian on the Palatine Hill in Rome. It was completed in AD 92 by the emperor Domitian and is attributed to his architect Rabirius.

The term Domus Flavia is a modern designation for the northwestern section of the palace, where most of the large public rooms used for official business, entertainment and ceremony were concentrated. Although Domitian was the last emperor of the Flavian dynasty, the palace continued to be used, with modifications, until the end of the Roman Empire.

It is connected to the domestic wing to the southeast, the Domus Augustana, a name which in antiquity may have applied to the palace as a whole.

== Layout ==
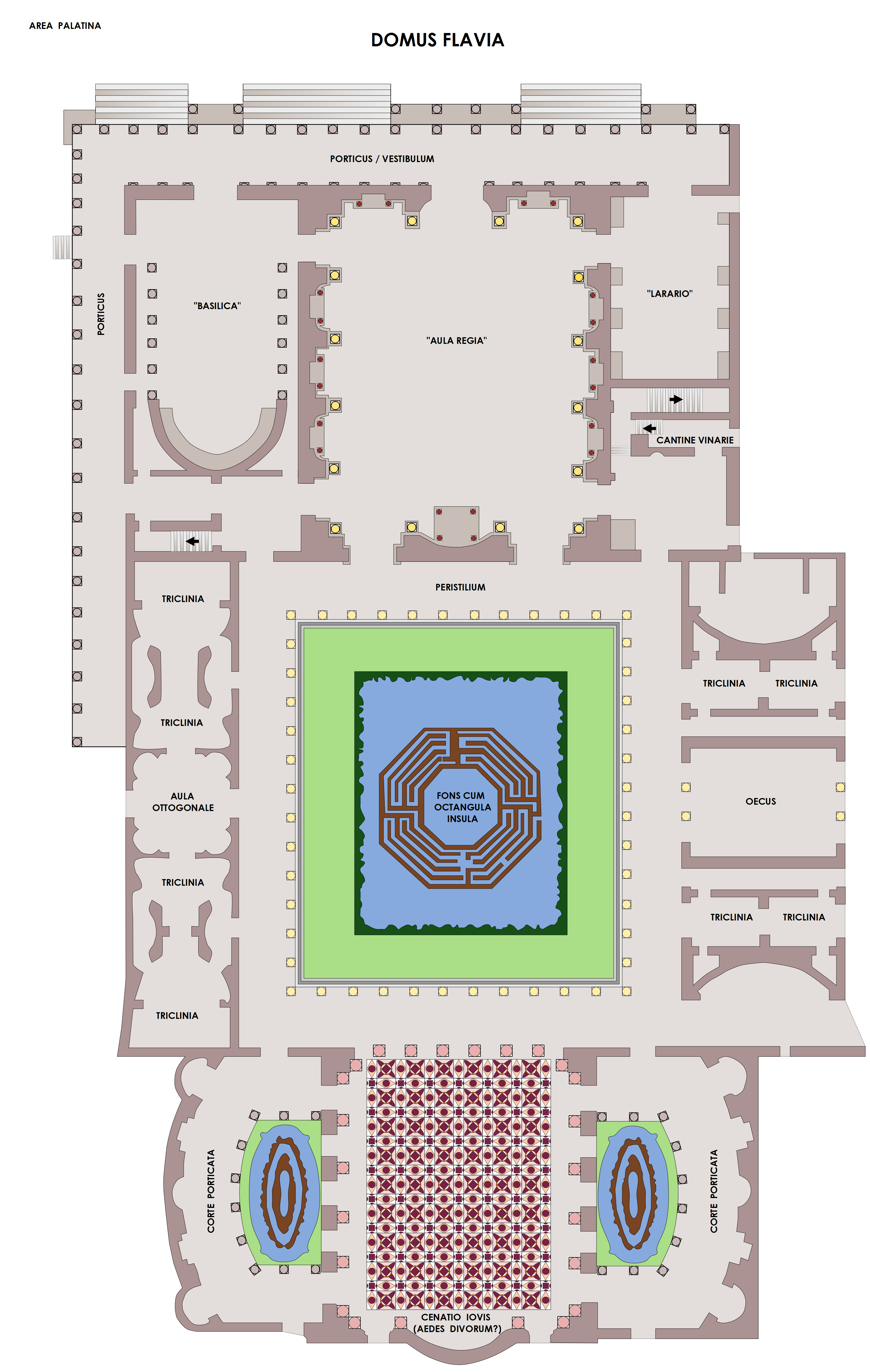
Plan of the Domus Flavia

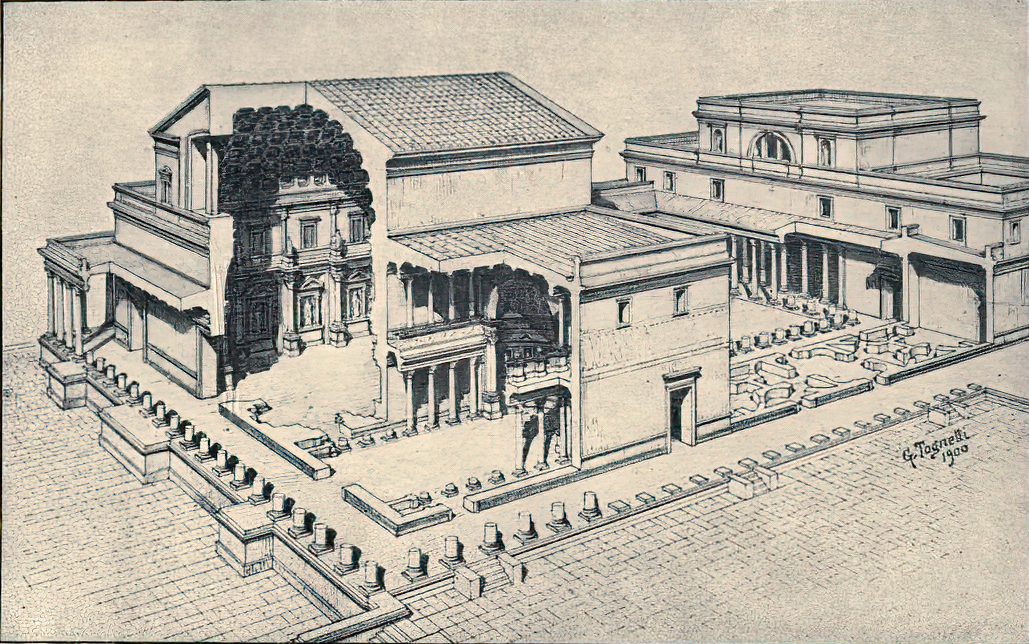
Reconstruction of the Domus Flavia by G. Tognetti, 1900

The Domus Flavia is organized around a large peristyle courtyard surrounded by rooms of considerable height. Only a few walls survive to a height of approximately 16 m (52 ft); some are about 3 m (9.8 ft) thick. The palace was constructed over portions of Nero's earlier residences, the Domus Transitoria and Domus Aurea, and excavations have shown that it retained parts of their layout.

On the northern side, the enormous aula regia was the central and largest room. It was flanked by two smaller reception rooms, conventionally called the Basilica and the Lararium. The northern façades of the three rooms opened onto a portico forming the principal entrance to the palace for visitors arriving from the Roman Forum.

=== Aula Regia ===
The Aula Regia was an enormous rectangular audience chamber used for important receptions and embassies. A shallow apse was built into its southern wall, where the emperor would have sat during audiences; doorways on either side opened directly onto the peristyle. To the north, the hall opened onto a monumental portico overlooking the palace forecourt, from which the emperor received the morning salutatio.

The poet Statius, a contemporary of Domitian, described the splendour of the palace, particularly the Aula Regia, in his Silvae:

Awesome and vast is the edifice, distinguished not by a hundred columns but by as many as could shoulder the gods and the sky if Atlas were let off. The Thunderer's palace next door gapes at it and the gods rejoice that you are lodged in a like abode […]: so great extends the structure and the sweep of the far-flung hall, more expansive than that of an open plain, embracing much enclosed sky and lesser only than its master.

The hall's relatively thin walls precluded a vaulted roof across its 30.6 m (100 ft) span. It was probably covered by roof trusses concealed beneath a coffered ceiling rising at least 30 m (98 ft) above the floor.

The walls were clad in exotic marble veneer and punctuated by niches framed by projecting architectural elements. Coarelli interprets the niches as settings for large statues of coloured stone and associates two colossi now in Parma with this decorative scheme. The statues, generally identified as Hercules and Dionysus and known as the Palatine Colossi, were not excavated in the Aula Regia itself. Eighteenth-century records place their discovery in the adjacent Basilica, apparently in a secondary position.

=== Basilica ===
The room is conventionally called the Basilica because its plan resembles that of a civic basilica. It was a rectangular hall terminating in a deep semicircular apse and was probably divided into three aisles by two rows of columns. It may have served as the meeting place of the emperor's council, where political and administrative decisions were made.

The colossal statues of Hercules and Dionysus now known as the Palatine Colossi were discovered on the floor of the Basilica during the Farnese excavations in April 1724. Their original placement within the palace is uncertain.

Beneath the Basilica is the Aula Isiaca, a room decorated with frescoes dating to around 30 BC and probably once forming part of the Domus Augusti. It was subsequently built over by Nero's Domus Transitoria.

=== Lararium ===
The room was misidentified by eighteenth-century excavators as a shrine for the Lares, or household gods. It may instead have been used by the Praetorian Guard, as it stood immediately east of the Clivus Palatinus, along which visitors approached the palace. Behind the so-called Lararium was a staircase providing access to the Domus Augustana below. Portions of the earlier House of the Griffins have been excavated beneath it, and its surviving decorations were removed to the Palatine Museum.

=== Peristyle ===
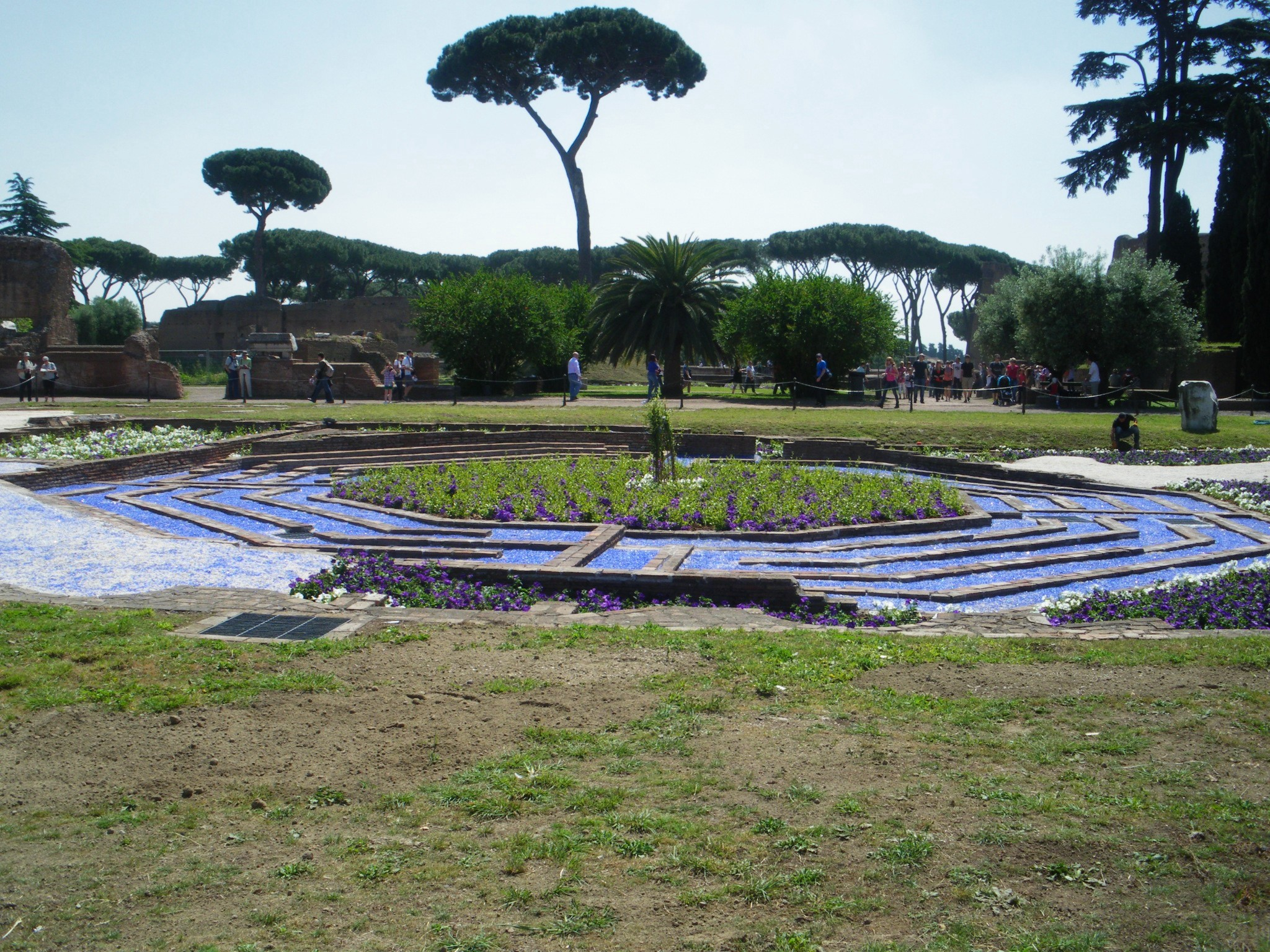
Peristyle with octagonal island

The principal entrance from the west led first into the Aula Ottagonale, with elaborate triclinia on either side, and then into the large peristyle garden. A pool occupied most of the courtyard and surrounded an octagonal island crossed by a pattern of channels and fountains, all faced with marble.

The columns surrounding the peristyle were made from yellow Numidian marble and supported a sculpted entablature beneath the roof.

=== Banqueting hall ===
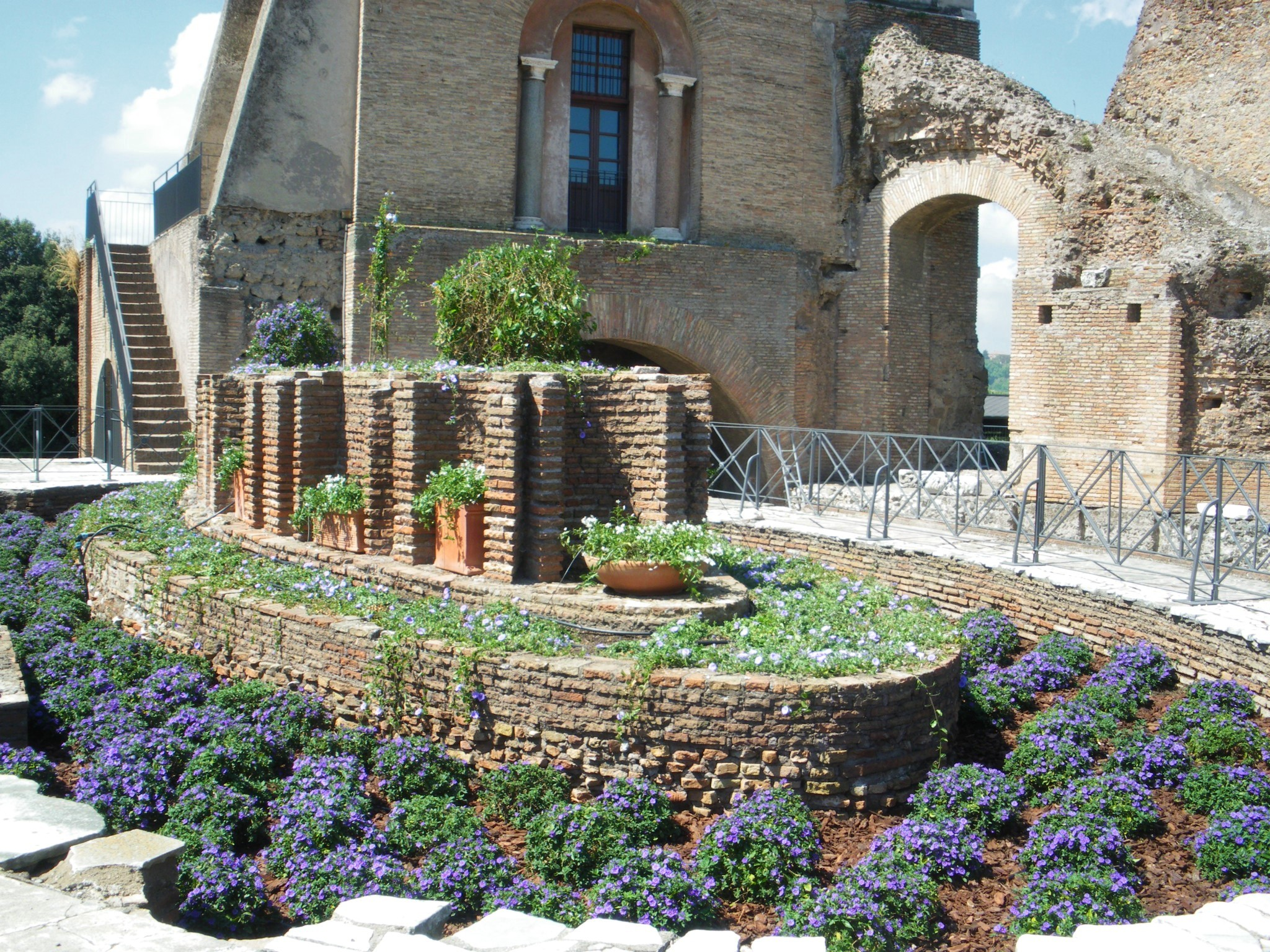
Oval fountain of the cenatio

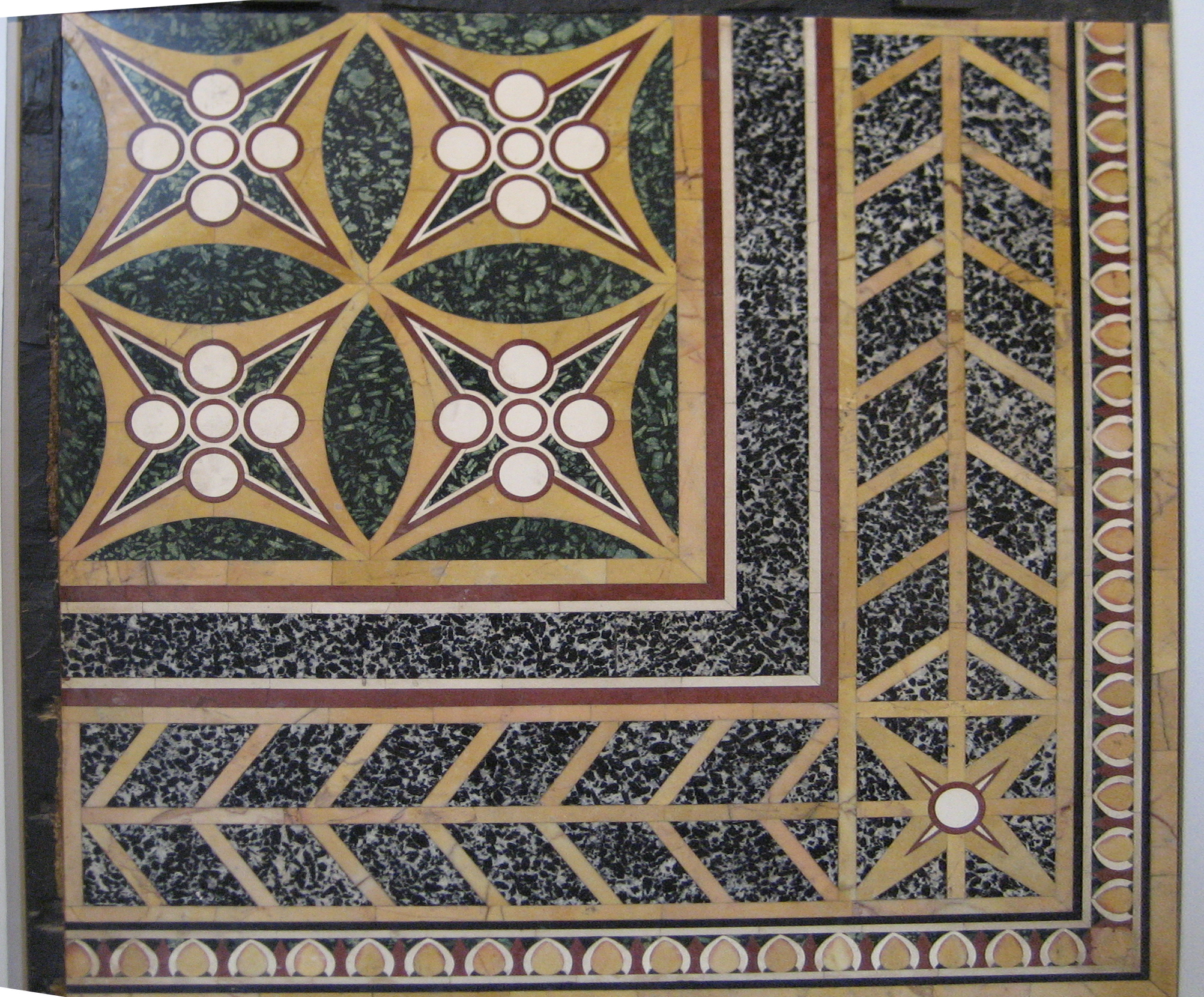
Opus sectile panel from the cenatio of Nero's palace, now in the Palatine Museum

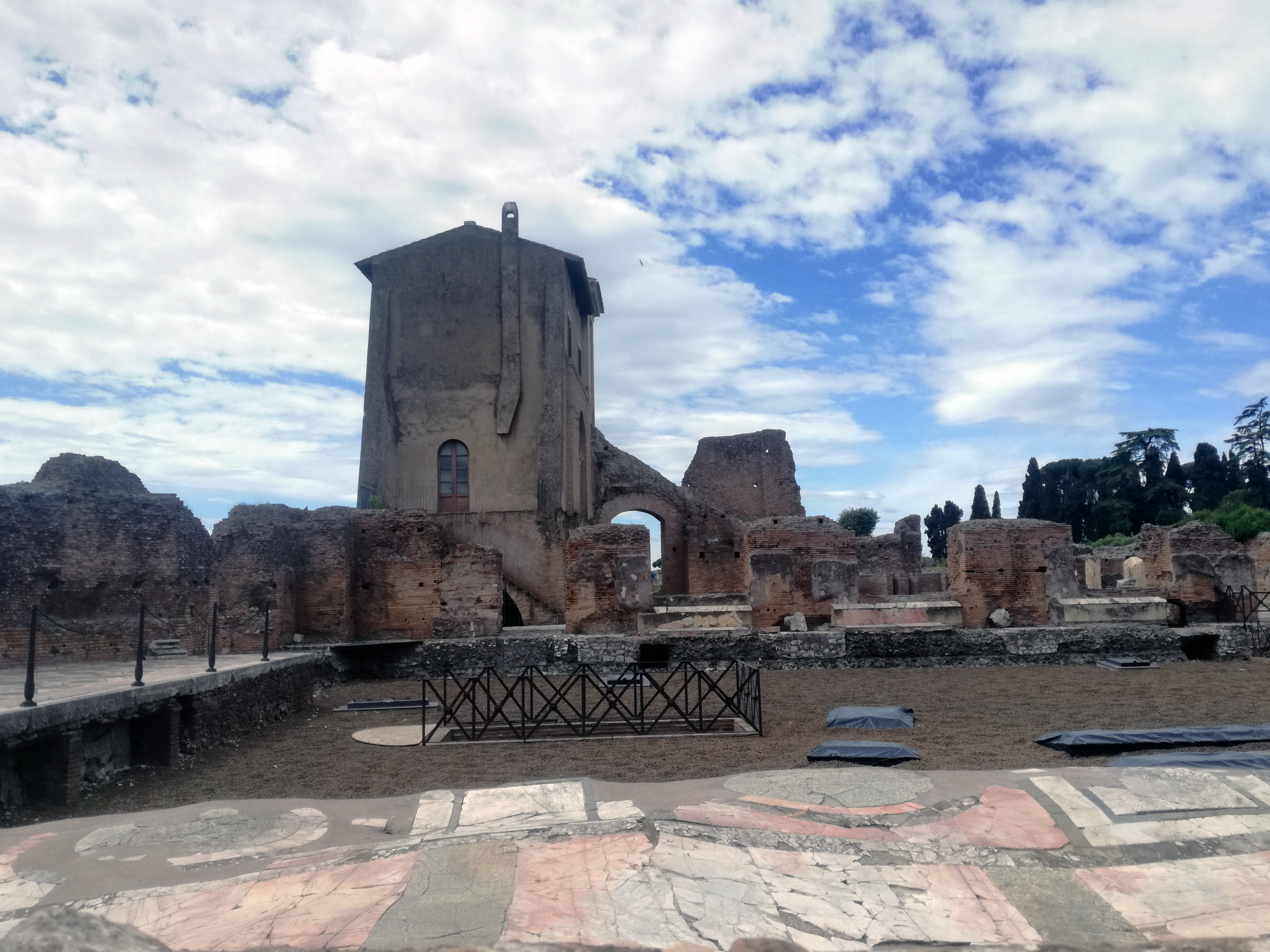
Marble floor border of the cenatio

The cenatio, or banqueting hall, stands on the southwestern side of the peristyle and is the second-largest room in the palace. Like the Aula Regia, it was richly decorated with several tiers of columns in imported marbles and a sculpted frieze. Guests could look through large windows onto the peristyle pool or into two adjoining courtyards containing oval marble fountains surrounded by yellow Numidian marble columns.

An apse in the centre of the southern wall was flanked by passages giving access to the library of the Temple of Apollo Palatinus. The surviving marble floor dates to the early fourth century, while the hypocaust beneath it dates to the 120s, during the reign of Hadrian. The heating system suggests that the room was used for winter banquets and supports its identification with the Cenatio Iovis mentioned in ancient literary sources.

Martial described a banquet given there by Domitian:

Great as is reported to have been the feast at the triumph over the giants, and glorious as was to all the gods that night on which the kind father sat at table with the inferior deities, and the Fauns were permitted to ask wine from Jupiter (i.e. Domitian); so grand are the festivals that celebrate your victories, O Caesar; and our joys enliven the gods themselves. All the knights, the people, and the senate, feast with you, and Rome partakes of ambrosial repasts with her ruler. You promised much; but how much more have you given! Only a sportula was promised, but you have set before us a splendid supper.

The cenatio was built over two earlier halls constructed by Nero before and after the Great Fire of Rome in AD 64, as parts of the Domus Transitoria and Domus Aurea respectively. Their layouts resemble that of the later room, and much of the earlier construction remains intact beneath the Flavian floor. The marble floors of the adjoining fountains also belong to Nero's palace. Their decoration comprises floral and climbing-plant designs in red and green porphyry, yellow and red Numidian marble, and white and yellow Phrygian marble. The border consists of panels of pink-grey Chian marble framed in green porphyry.

== See also ==
- Domus
- Roman architecture
- List of Roman domes
- List of Greco-Roman roofs
- List of ancient monuments in Rome

Preceded by Domus Transitoria	Landmarks of Rome; Flavian Palace	Succeeded by House of Augustus
