= Domus Severiana =

Imperial palace extension in Rome

Coordinates: 41.8866°N 12.4878°E

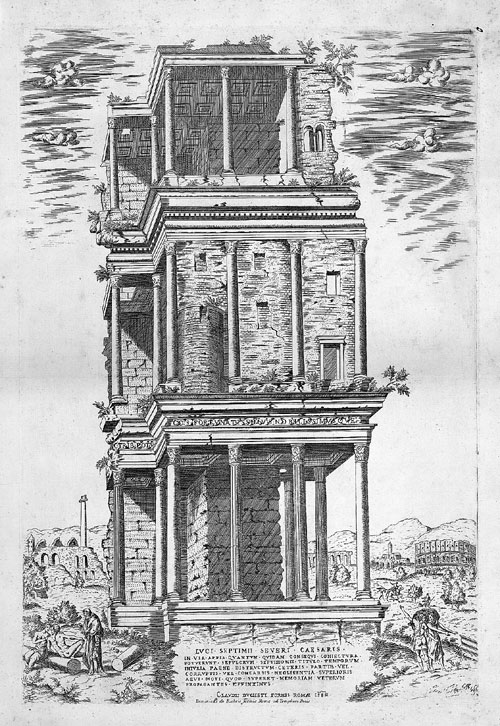
The remains of the Septizodium in a print of 1582, just prior to its demolition

The Domus Severiana is the modern name given to the final extension to the imperial palaces on the Palatine Hill in Rome, built to the south-east of the Stadium Palatinum in the Domus Augustana of Septimius Severus. It included the Baths of Septimius Severus (Latin: Balneum Palatii).

All that remains of the building are the imposing brick substructures at the corner of the hill, which created an artificial platform at the same level as the palace of Domitian, extending it, since the emperors had run out of space on the hill. There are very few remains of the building itself, which was then built on the terrace supported by the substructures. It had a view of Rome from the Circus Maximus and the Aventine Hill to the Caelian Hill and the Baths of Caracalla. They were part of an imperial baths complex or thermae, now visible in the remains below the exedra of the Stadium Palatinum, which may have been built under Domitian and which was rebuilt by Maxentius. They were fed by a branch of the Aqua Claudia, which spanned the valley between the Palatine Hill and the Caelian Hill and whose arches are still visible.

On the side facing the via Appia, Septimius Severus commissioned an impressive three-level facade akin to the scaenae frons in a theatre, with fountains and colonnades. This became known as the Septizodium. It is said that the emperor monumentalised this side of the building to impress his fellow Africans, who would arrive in Rome along the via Appia. The Septizodium's remains were demolished in the 16th century and it is only known from Renaissance drawings.

== See also ==
- List of ancient monuments in Rome

== Bibliography ==
- Filippo Coarelli, Guida archeologica di Roma, Arnoldo Mondadori Editore, Verona 1984.
