= Palace of Domitian =

Building in Rome, Italy

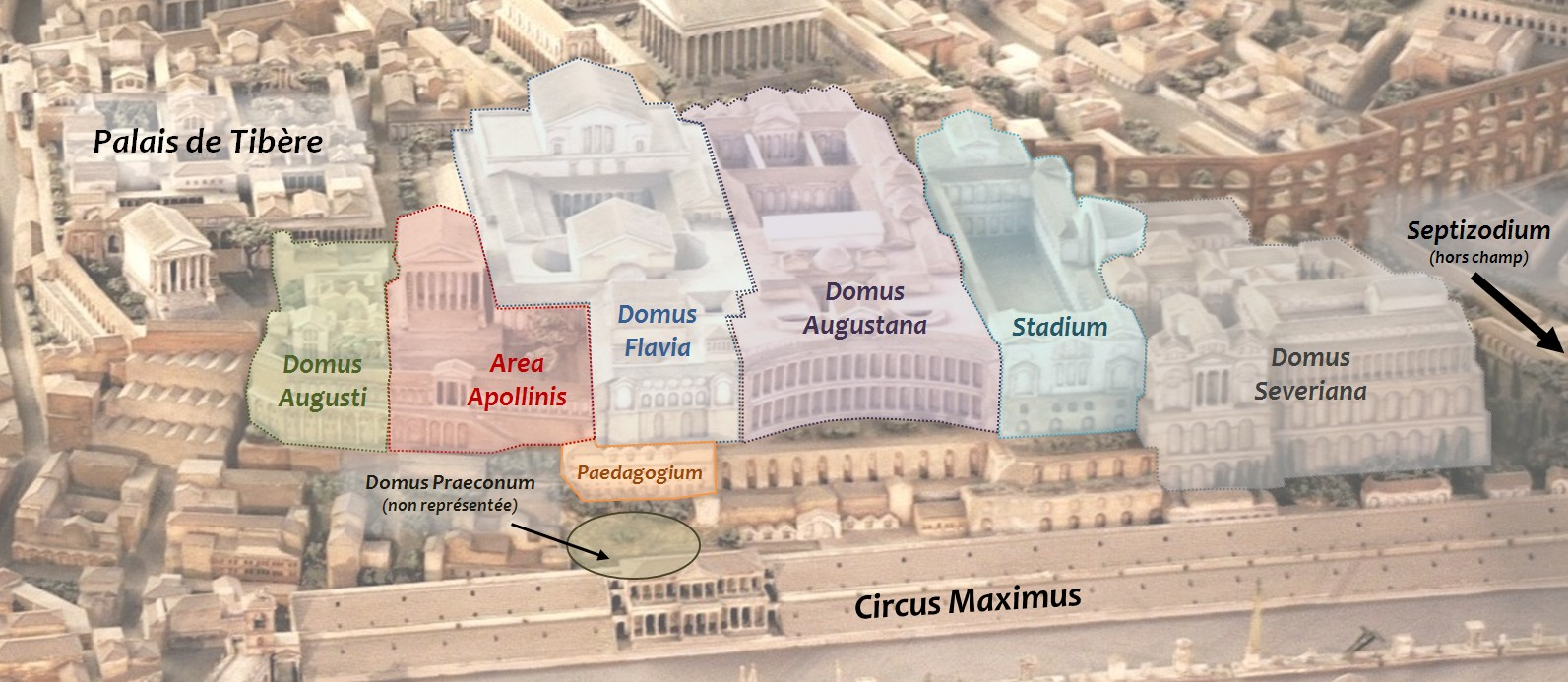
- Names of parts of the Palace

- Shown within Augustan Rome
- Interactive map of Palace of Domitian
- 41°53′20″N 12°29′11″E

The Palace of Domitian was built as Roman emperor Domitian's official residence in 81–87 AD and was used as such by subsequent emperors. Its remains sit atop and dominate Palatine Hill in Rome, alongside other palaces.

The Palace is a massive structure separated today into three areas. In the past, these partitions allowed business and political matters to have separation from private life while their close proximity allowed them to be conducted in parallel if required. The modern names used for these areas are:

- the Domus Flavia
- the Domus Augustana
- the garden or "stadium".

Not all of the palace can be seen as portions lie under more recent buildings, much like a significant portion of the remains of Ancient Rome.

The palace was one of Domitian's many architectural projects including renovation of the Circus Maximus, renovation of the Pantheon, and three temples deifying his family members: the temple of Vespasian and Titus, the Porticus Diuorum, and the Temple of the gens Flavia.

== History ==
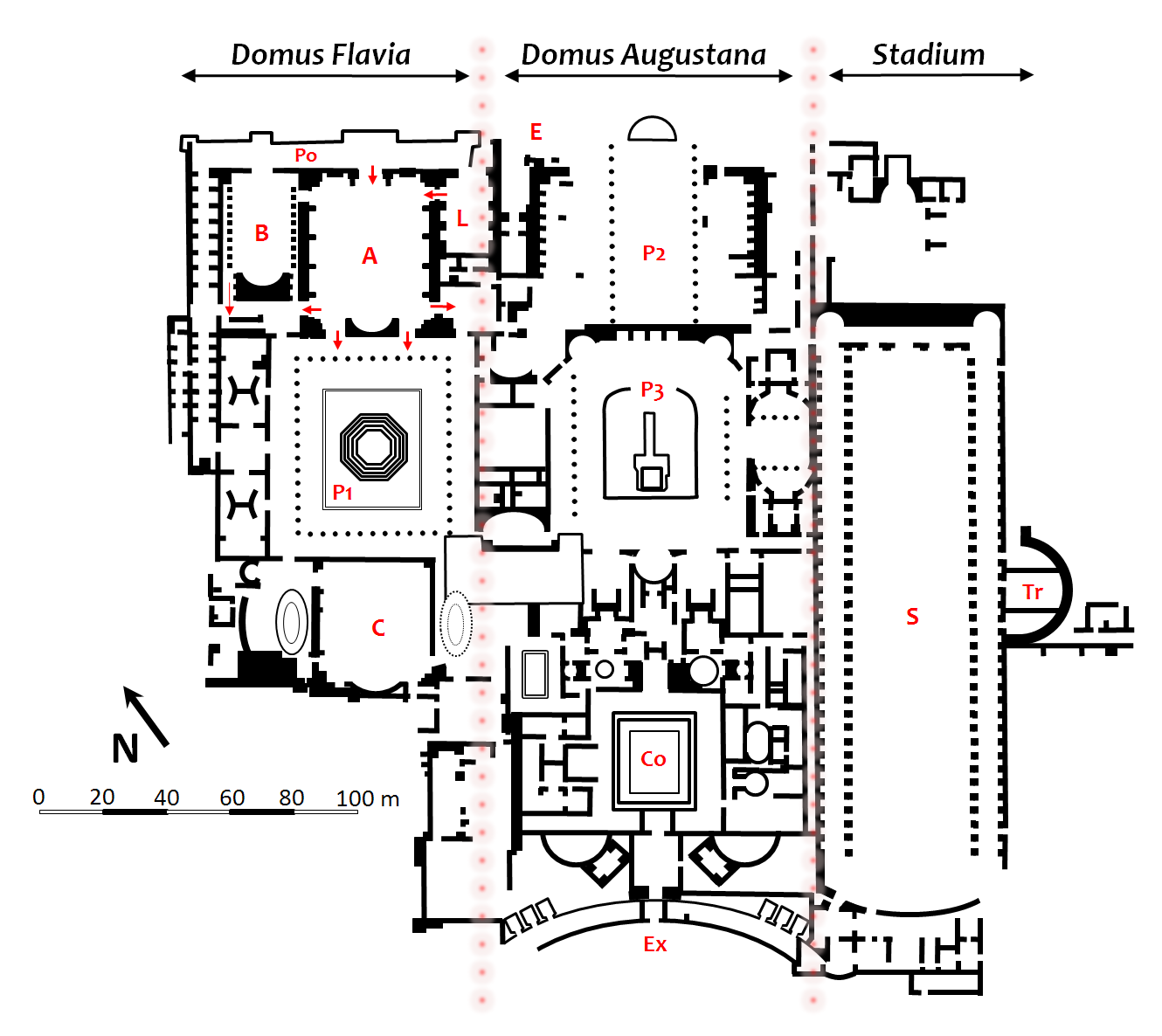
Domus Augustana: P2: 2nd peristyle P3: 3rd peristyle Co: courtyard Ex: grand exedra S: Stadium Tr: Tribune of the Stadium

The palace was designed by the architect Rabirius. It was built on top of earlier buildings, notably Nero's Domus Transitoria and the Republican House of the Griffins, significant remains of which have been discovered.

Under Septimius Severus a large extension was added along the southwestern slope of the hill overlooking the Circus Maximus, but otherwise the bulk of the Palace as constructed under Domitian remained remarkably intact for the remainder of the Empire. The Palace functioned as the official residence of the Roman Emperors until the fall of the Western Roman Empire in the 5th century AD.

The palace was renovated under Theodoric the Great (r.493-526) the Ostrogothic King of Italy in the 6th century using the receipts from a specially levied tax.

== Domus Flavia ==
The Domus Flavia is the public wing of the Palace.

== Domus Augustana ==
The Domus Augustana was believed to be the private wing of the palace.

== The Garden or "stadium" ==
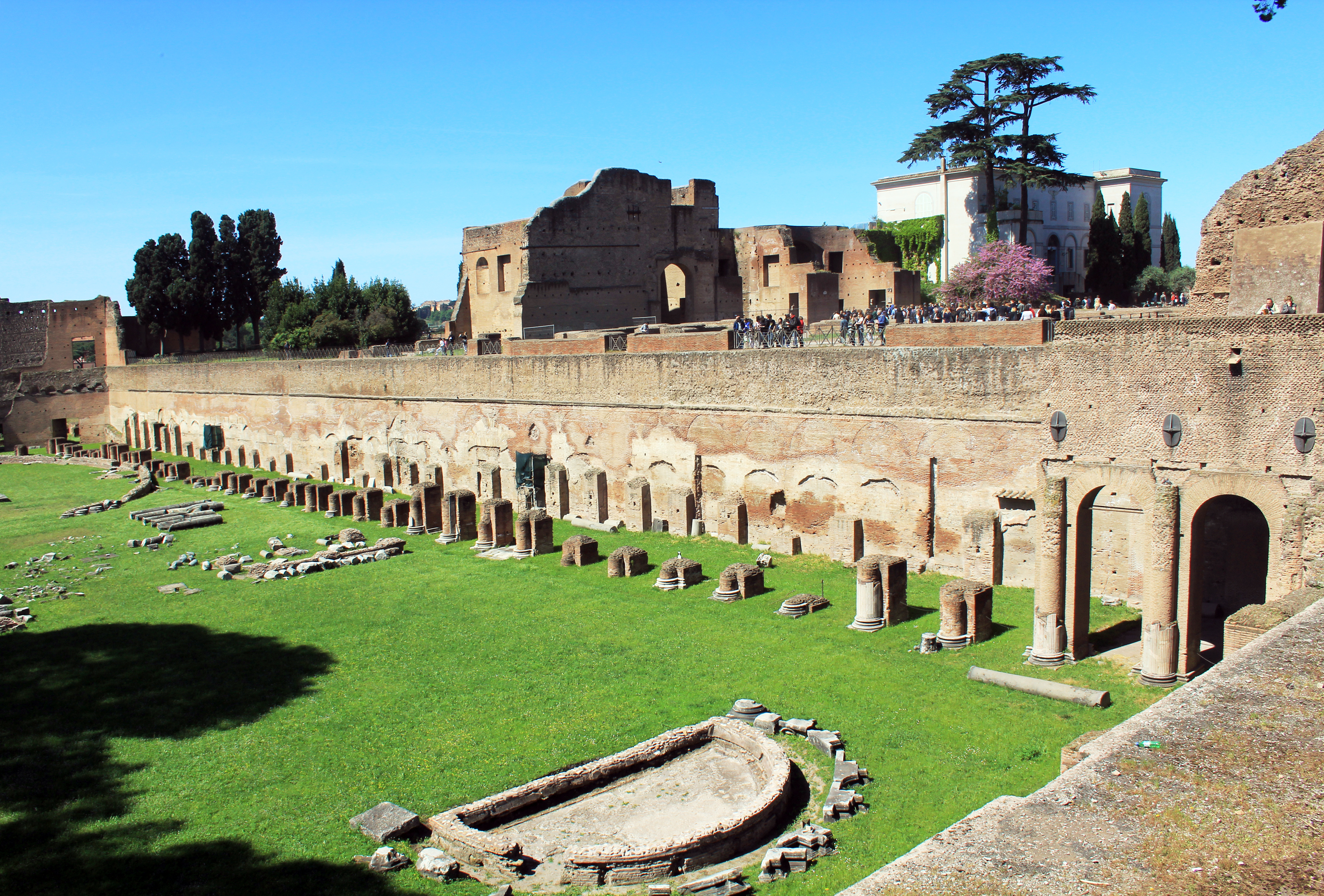
Garden or "stadium" of the Palace of Domitian

The so-called "Hippodrome" or "Stadium" of Domitian (160 x 48 m) extends over the entire eastern side of the Domus Augustana. It has the appearance of a Roman Circus but is too small to accommodate chariots. In reality, it was a large and elaborate sunken garden, similar to the earlier one at the Roman Villa of Pliny "in Tuscis", and most of the statuary in the nearby Palatine museum comes from the Stadium. Domitian enjoyed this form of garden as shown by the one he also built at his country villa in the Alban Hills. It may have been used as a private riding school which must have been present in the private villas of the time, according to Pliny the Younger; in the Acts of the Martyrs, a Hippodromus Palatii is mentioned concerning Saint Sebastian, which must certainly have been this.

On the eastern side was a large semi-circular exedra on three levels, decorated with sculptures and fountains, commanding views of the garden below. A belvedere sat atop its concrete dome. Around the perimeter ran a two-story portico upheld by slender columns veneered in expensive coloured marble. The lower level feature a sheltered promenade adorned with an elaborate stuccoed roof vault.

=== History ===
The stadium was the last section of the palace to be built; proceeding the completion of the first two parts (completed: 92 AD). The stadium's construction replaced older buildings dating from the Roman Republic to Nero.

Brick stamps show that Hadrian reinforced the structure of the porticos. In the Severan era the exedra was reduced to a quarter circle externally when the adjacent Severan Baths were built. The small oval enclosure in the southern end dates to the time of Theodoric (early 6th c.) when it was perhaps used as a private amphitheatre (certainly not as a training ground for gladiators, as this type of show was abolished since the time of Honorius).

The complex was discovered and excavated in the 18th century which was soon followed by looting which irreparably compromised the state of the building.

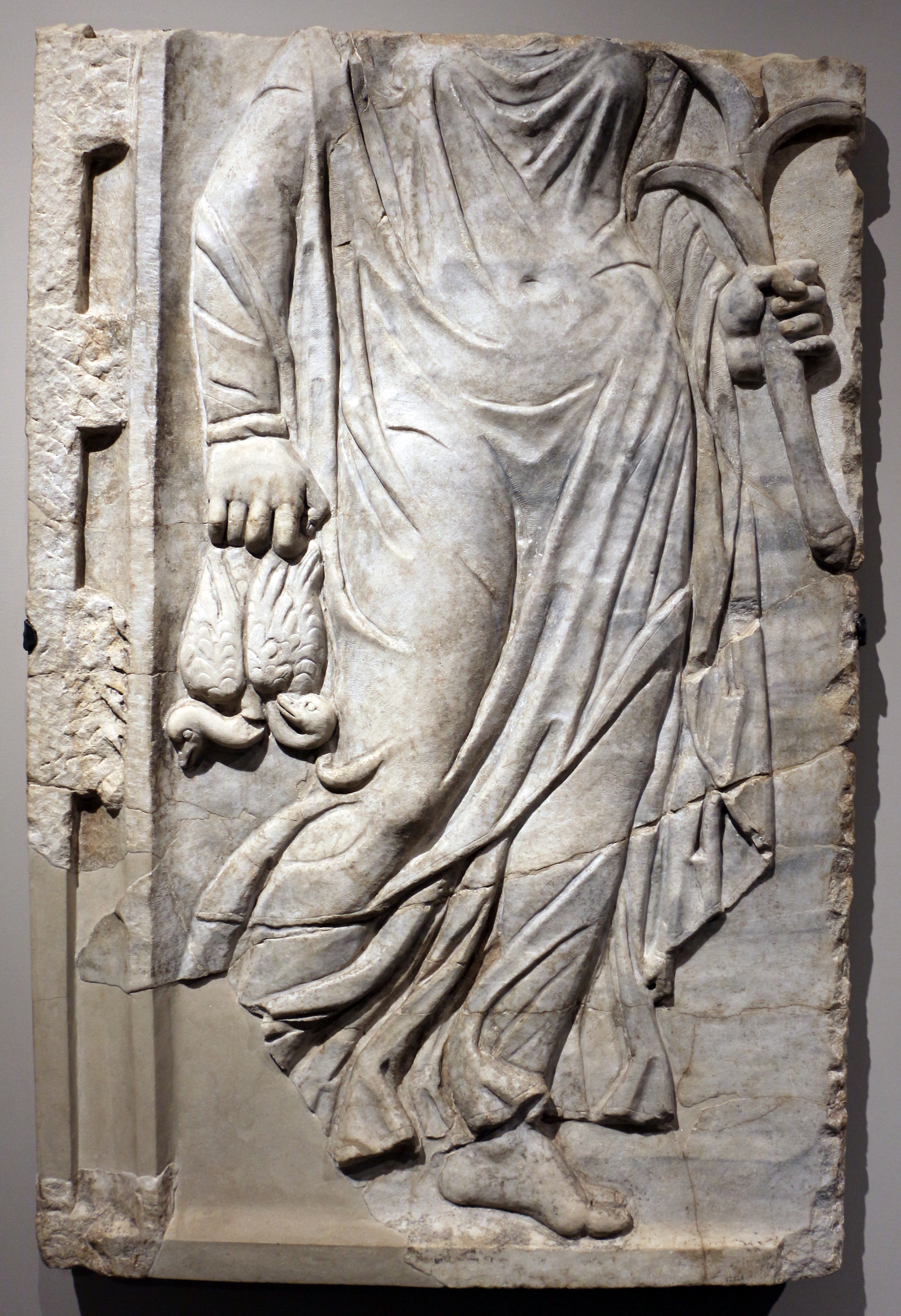
"Spring"

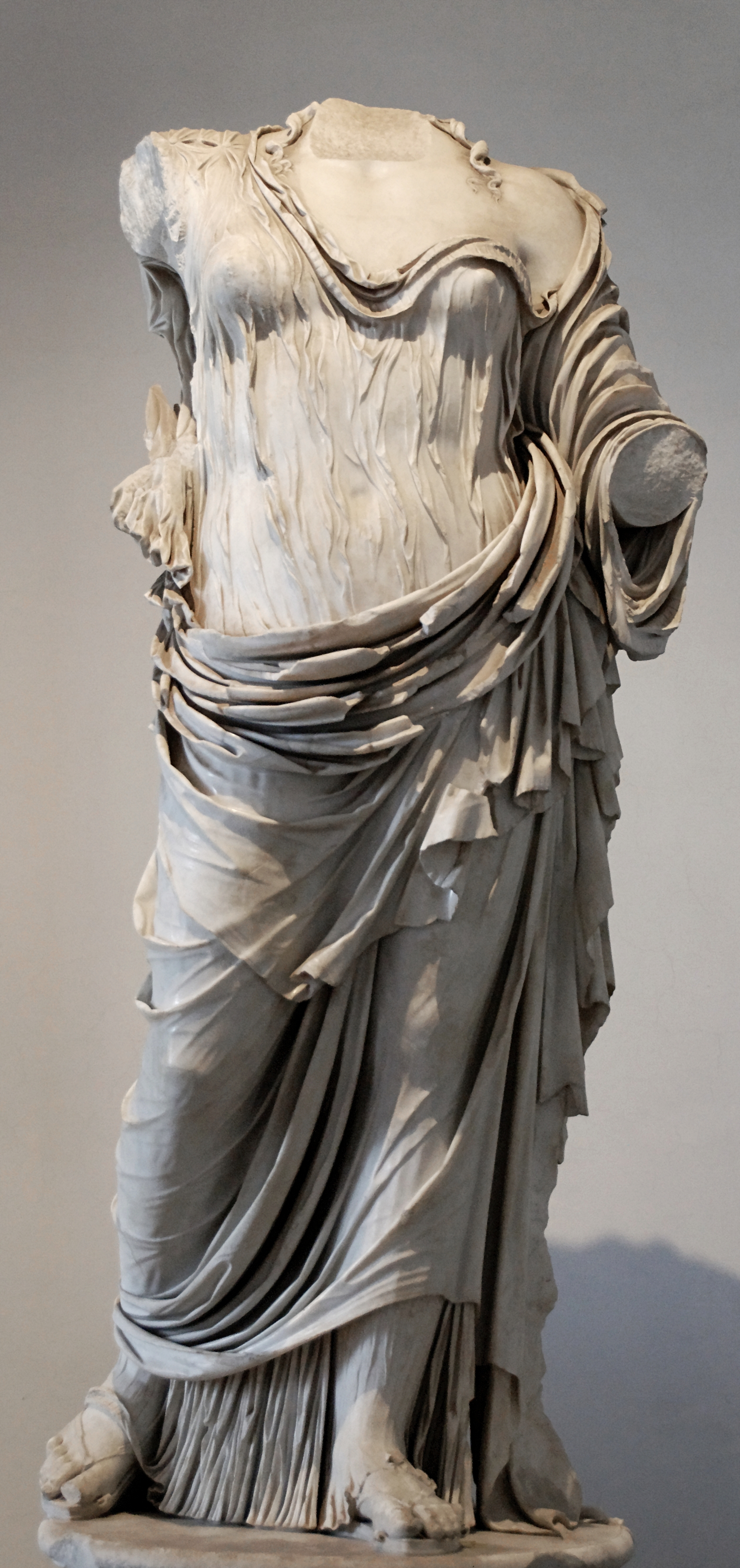
Aphrodite (type "Hera Borghese")

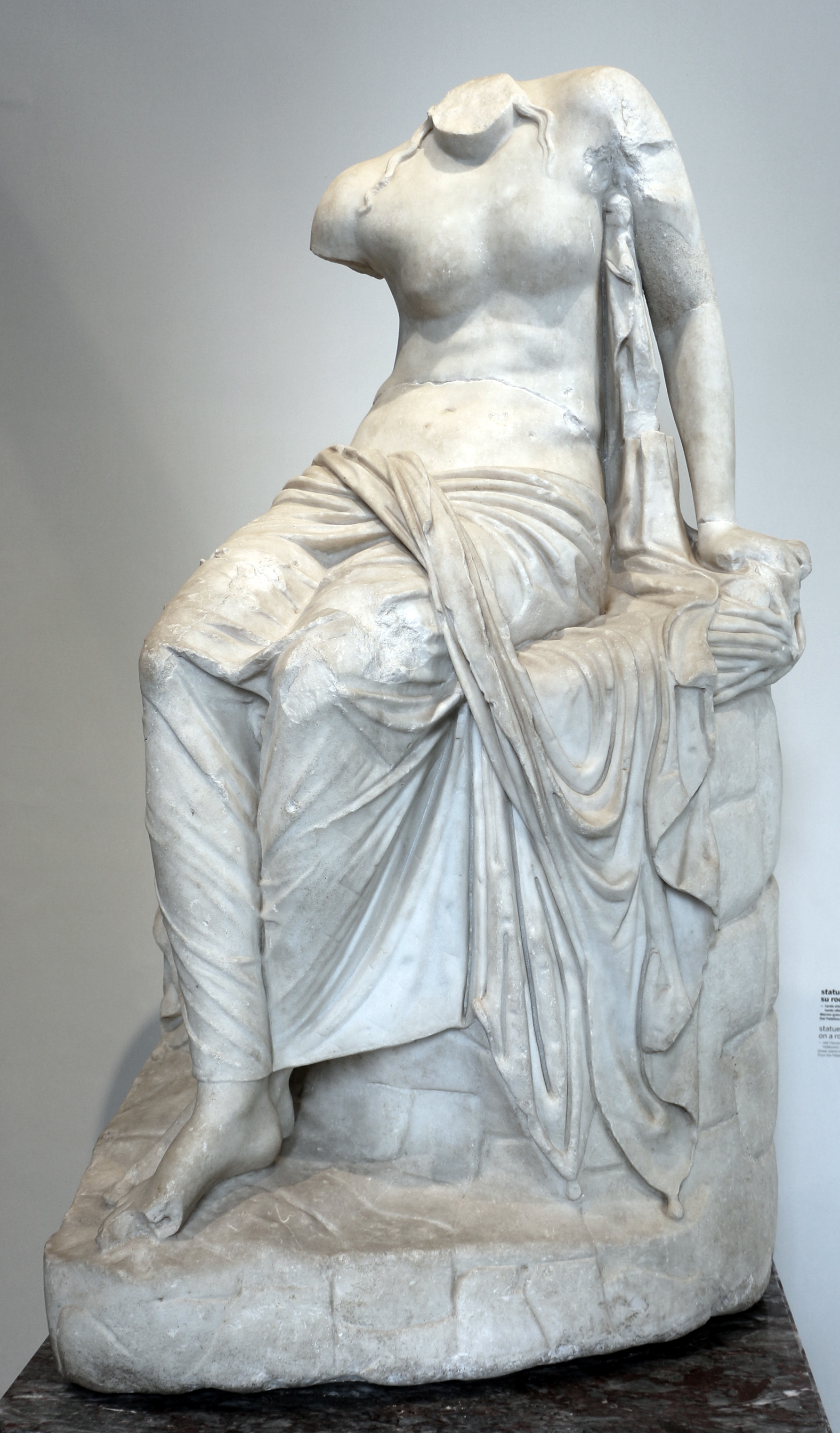
Nymph 69–96 AD

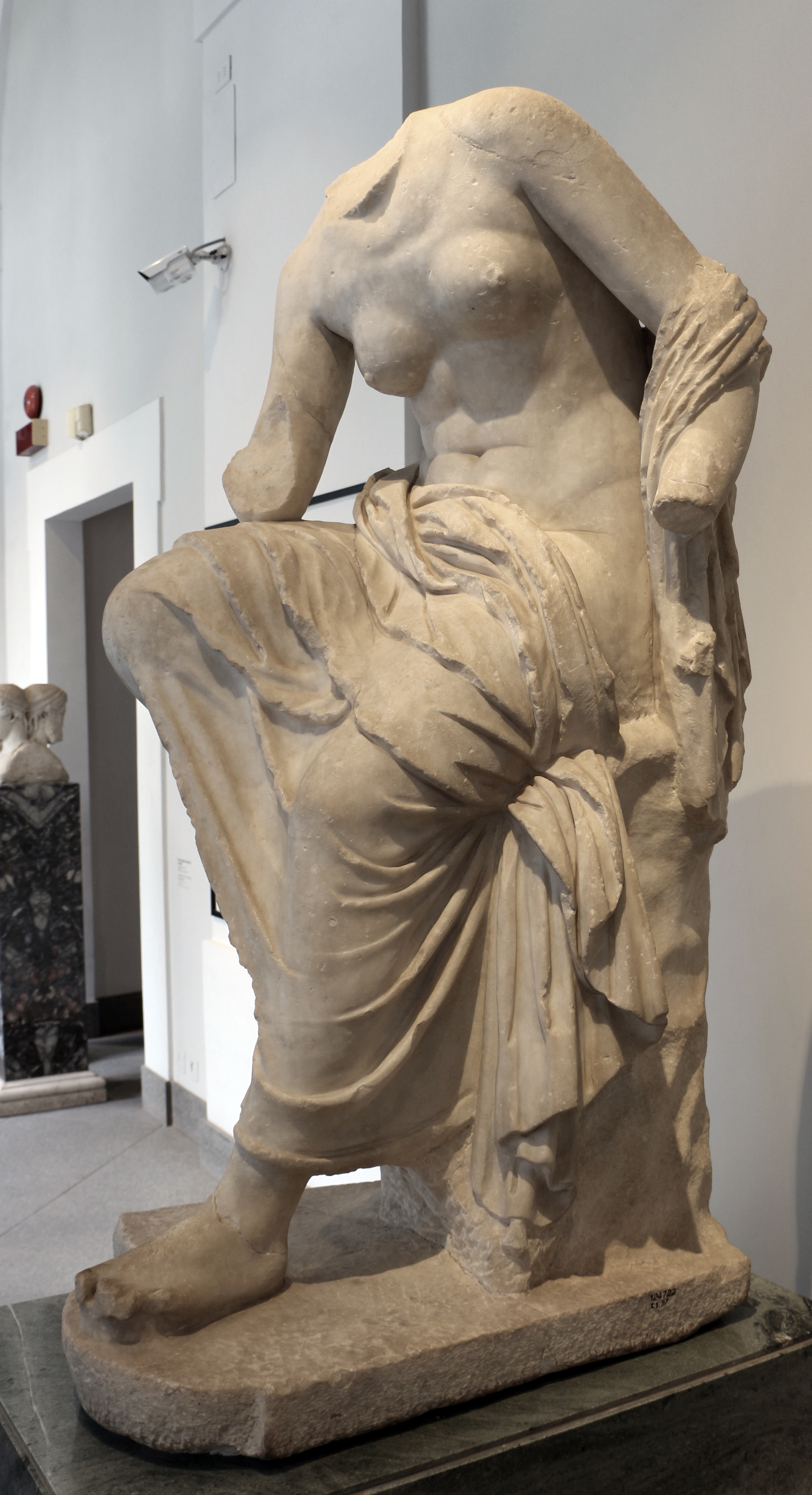
Muse 90 AD (type Dresden-Zagreb)

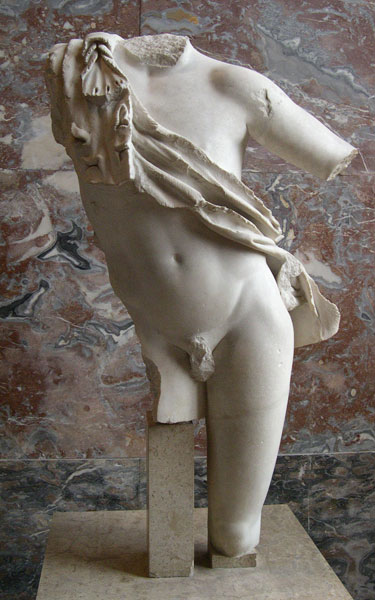
Torso of the type of the Leaning satyr. Marble, Roman copy from the reign of Domitian (81–96 AD)

== See also ==
- List of ancient monuments in Rome

== Other sources ==
- Fred S. Kleiner. A History of Roman Art. Wadsworth Publishing. 1st Edition. 2007. Chapter 13 Page 187.
- Filippo Coarelli, Rome and surroundings, an archaeological guide, University of California Press, London, 2007

Preceded by House of Augustus	Landmarks of Rome; Palace of Domitian	Succeeded by Villa Gordiani
