= Roman Villa of Pliny "in Tuscis" =

Ancient Roman villa-estate

Coordinates: 43.530815°N 12.214688°E

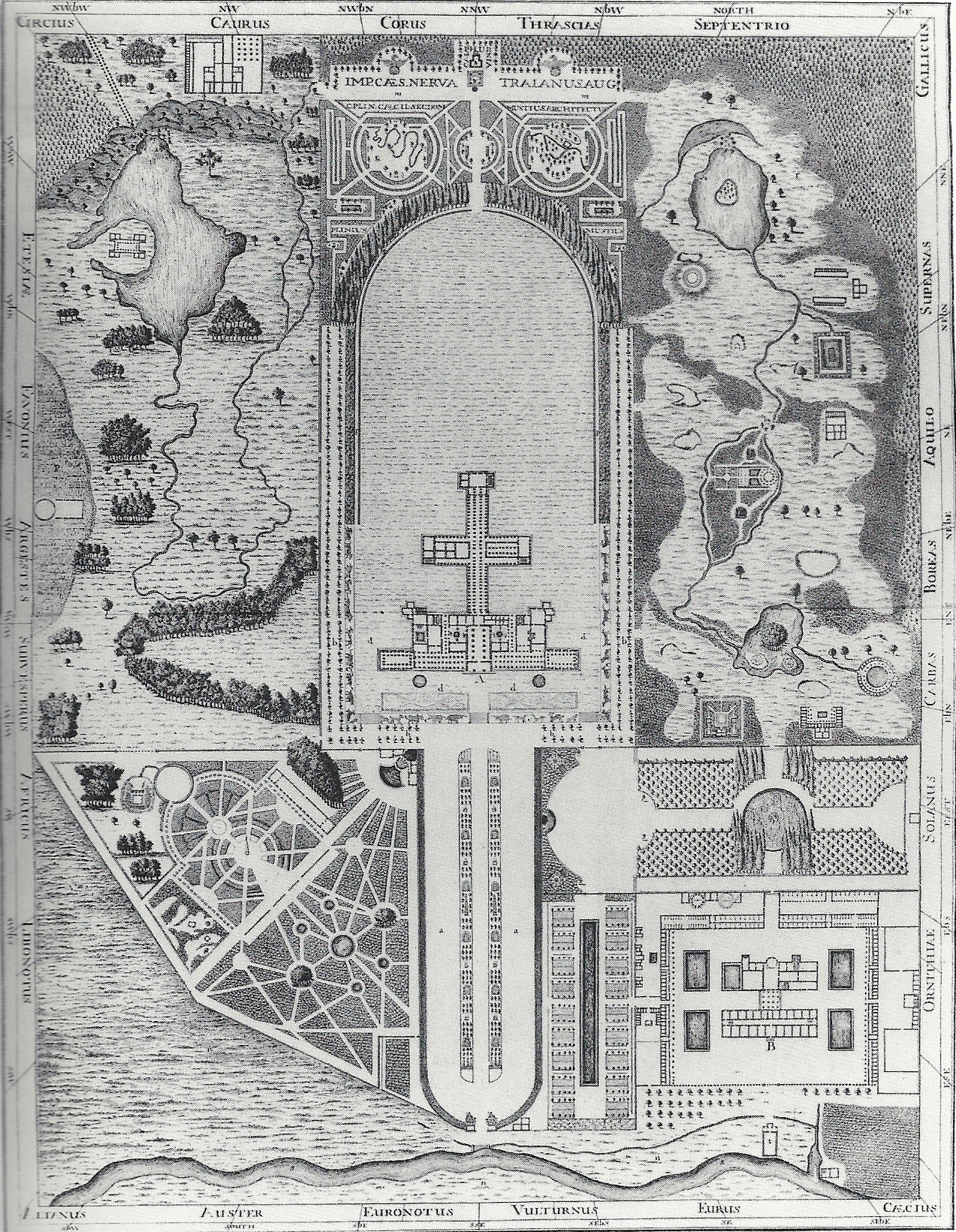
Reconstructed plan of Pliny's villa in Tuscis (Robert Castell 1728)

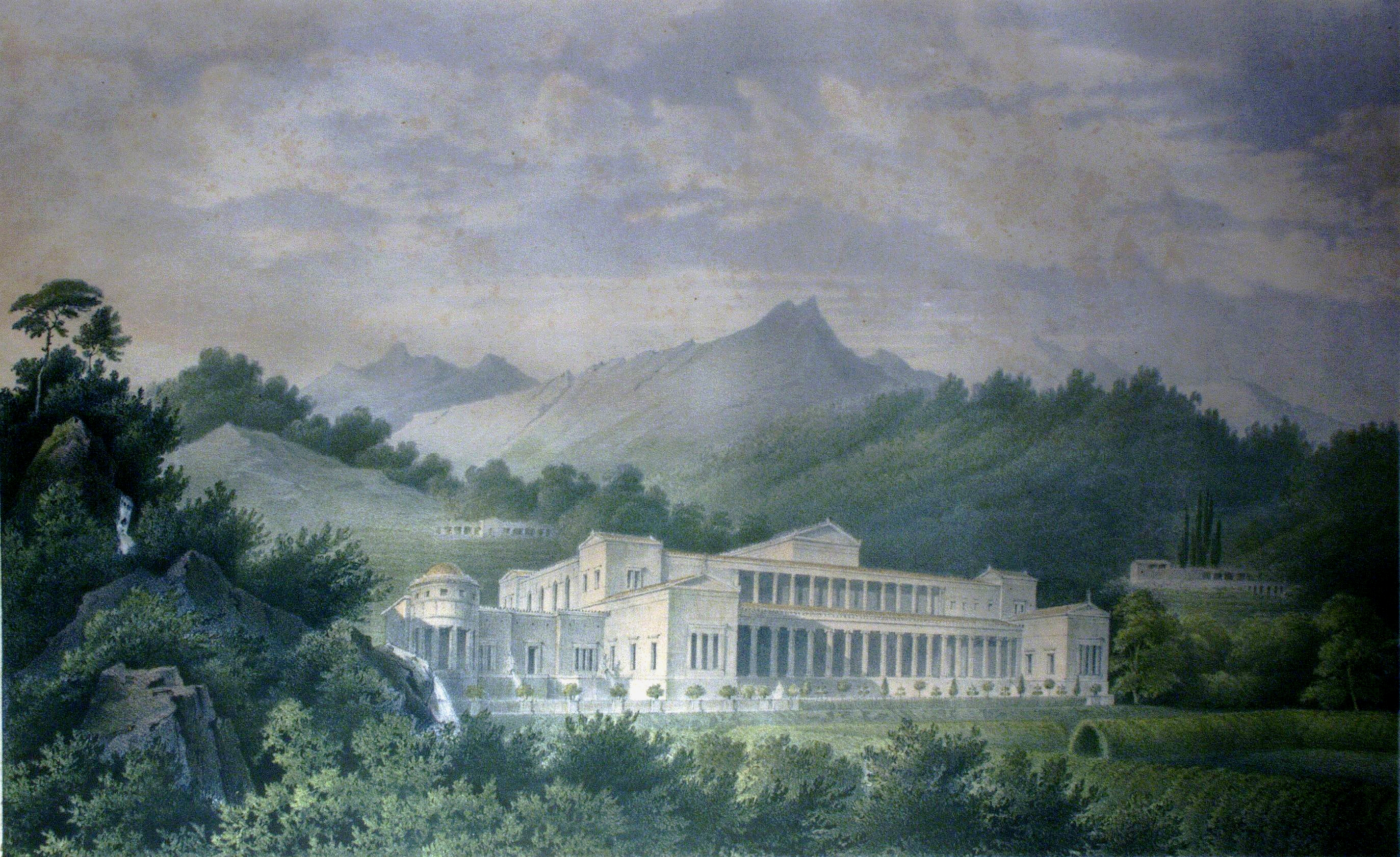
Reconstruction by Karl Friedrich Schinkel, 1842

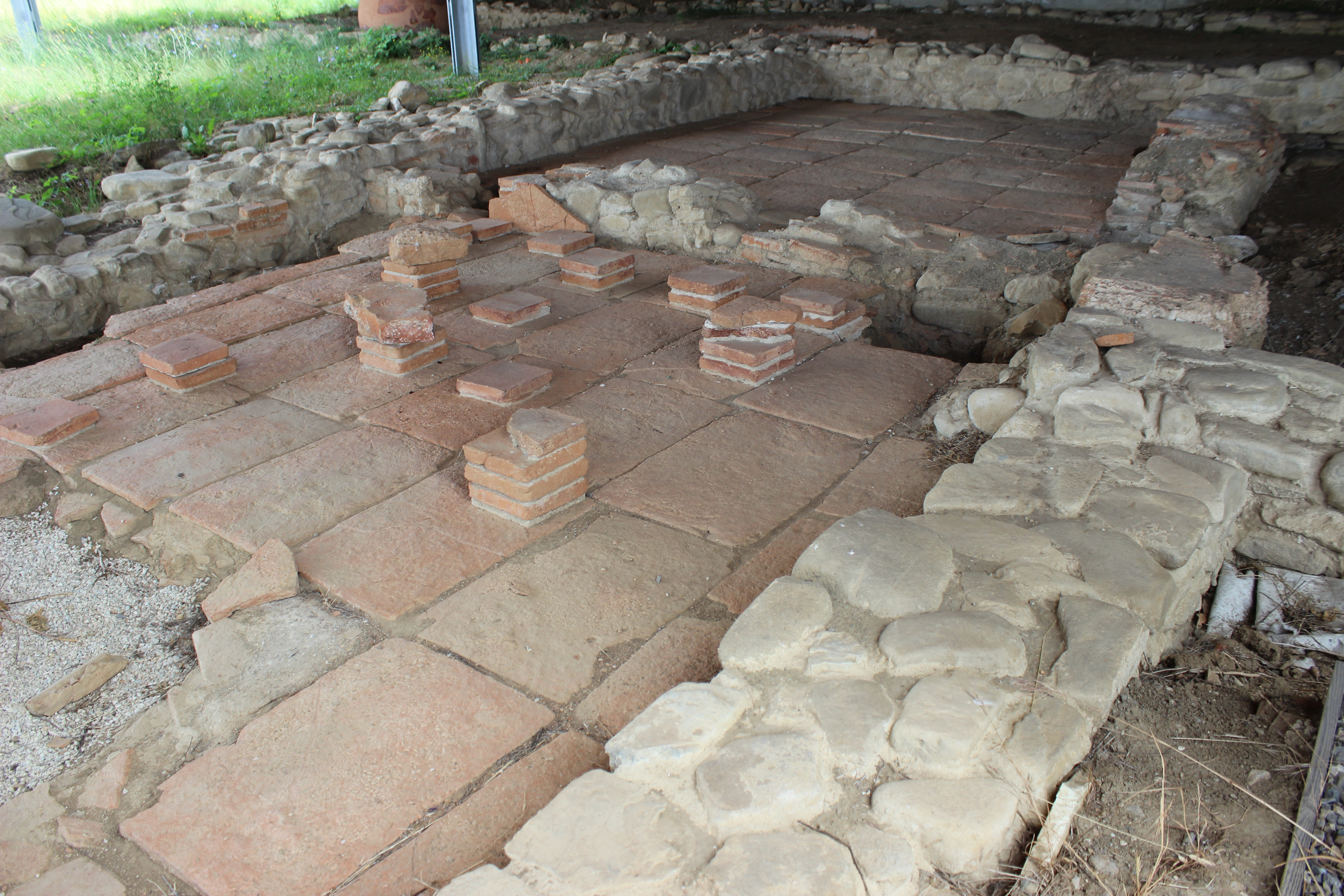
Excavations at Colle Plinio

The Villa of Pliny in Tuscis was a large, elaborate ancient Roman villa-estate that belonged to the Plinys (Pliny the Elder and Pliny the Younger). It is located at Colle Plinio near San Giustino, Umbria, Italy.

He called it his villa in Tuscis (in Tuscany) and often mentioned it in letters.

It is now an important archaeological site even though parts have been destroyed in the past by farming.

It was identified by tile-stamps with the names of the Plinys (CPS: Caius Plinius Secundus and CPCS: Caius Plinius Caecilius Secundus) and by an inscription mentioning a freedwoman named Plinia Chreste, clearly with Pliny as patron. Pliny the Younger wrote that "I prefer my Tuscan villa to those which I possess at Tusculum, Tiber, and Præneste. ... I enjoy here a cosier, more profound and undisturbed retirement than anywhere else".

Pliny the Younger also had two villas near Lake Como, Pliny's Comedy and Tragedy villas, and another at Laurentum.

It was located under the Apennine passes of Bocca Trabaria and Bocca Serriola, where wood was harvested for Roman ships and sent to Rome via the Tiber.

The Universities of Perugia and Alicante jointly conducted 18 excavation campaigns, the last being in August 2003.

== History ==
The villa was first built in the 3rd-2nd century BC Etruscan era from which traces of a large rectangular area (11 x 21 m) paved with cobblestones of fairly accurate workmanship have been found.

The villa was owned and rebuilt in 2 BC to 15 AD by Marcus Granius Grenellus, a member of the Granii family (a senatorial elite), as shown by terracotta stamps.

The villa of this phase was centered around an atrium, with rainwater collection tank below. The atrium was flanked by another large internal courtyard which was part of the farm of the villa. The atrium had access to a space directly overlooking the large lower terrace and the valley below. The farm (pars rustica) had a large winery, large threshing floor and a granary. Produce was sent to Rome via the Tiber river.

The family had trading business from the eastern ports to North Africa. In Umbria they prospered in the First Triumvirate, and particularly in Spello since an ancestor, M. Granius (probably his father), was an important municipal duumvir quinquennalis there. Marcus Granius Grenellus was appointed proconsul of Bithynia in 14-15 AD. He was accused of treason and extortion, was acquitted of the former charge, but convicted of the second and fined and his property confiscated. Tiles stamped “CAESAR” and dated 15 AD probably indicate this confiscation.

After this confiscation, thermal baths with calidarium, tepidarium and frigidarium were added in the northern corner of the villa. In addition the farm was provided with a vat for grape juice next to the winery and probably with storerooms and stables.

The estate was acquired by Pliny the Elder, nephew of Marcus Granius Marcellus, probably under Vespasian (69-79 AD). After Pliny the Elder had adopted his nephew as his sole heir in his will, on the death of his uncle in 79 AD (near Pompeii) the villa was inherited by Pliny the Younger (61-113 AD) who then added “Secundus” to his name.

During this phase (late 1st or early 2nd century AD), the villa was greatly extended with the help of the architect Mustius firstly with an impressive façade doubling the length of the villa, faced with a portico featuring symmetrical projecting avant-corps at its corners and a small temple in the centre. Behind the portico a large square was created which was flanked to the east by a pair of two-storey farm buildings.

After the death of Pliny the Younger in 113 AD the villa reverted to the emperor as indicated by tiles stamped IMP. It then was used continuously until the 4th century.

== Description ==
Pliny lovingly described the villa in great detail:

.. a broad and proportionately long portico, consisting of several rooms, particularly a court of antique fashion. In front of the portico is a sort of terrace, edged with box and shrubs cut into different shapes. You descend, from the terrace, by an easy slope adorned with the figures of animals in box, facing each other, to a lawn overspread with the soft, I had almost said the liquid, Acanthus: this is surrounded by a walk enclosed with evergreens, shaped into a variety of forms. Beyond it is the gestatio, laid out in the form of a circus running round the multiform box-hedge and the dwarf-trees, which are cut quite close. The whole is fenced in with a wall completely covered by box cut into steps all the way up to the top. On the outside of the wall lies a meadow that owes as many beauties to nature as all I have been describing within does to art; at the end of which are open plain and numerous other meadows and copses. From the extremity of the portico a large dining-room runs out, opening upon one end of the terrace, while from the windows there is a very extensive view over the meadows up into the country, and from these you also see the terrace and the projecting wing of the house together with the woods enclosing the adjacent hippodrome.

The majority of the present excavations are related to farm buildings. The residential part of the villa is thought to be most likely located under the village of Colle Plinio or at Villa Cappelletti on the hill above the excavations.

The "hippodrome" was most likely not for horse, or chariot, races but was a garden of the same shape similar to the later ones at the Palace of Domitian or Hadrian's Villa.

== Museum ==
The Museo Pliniano in the Villa Magherini Graziano, at Celalba di San Giustino, opened in December 2013. Some finds from the excavations at Colle Plinio are exhibited including inscribed ceramics, ceramic storage jars, lamps and other everyday items.
