= Domus Augustana =

Part of the Palace of Domitian, Rome

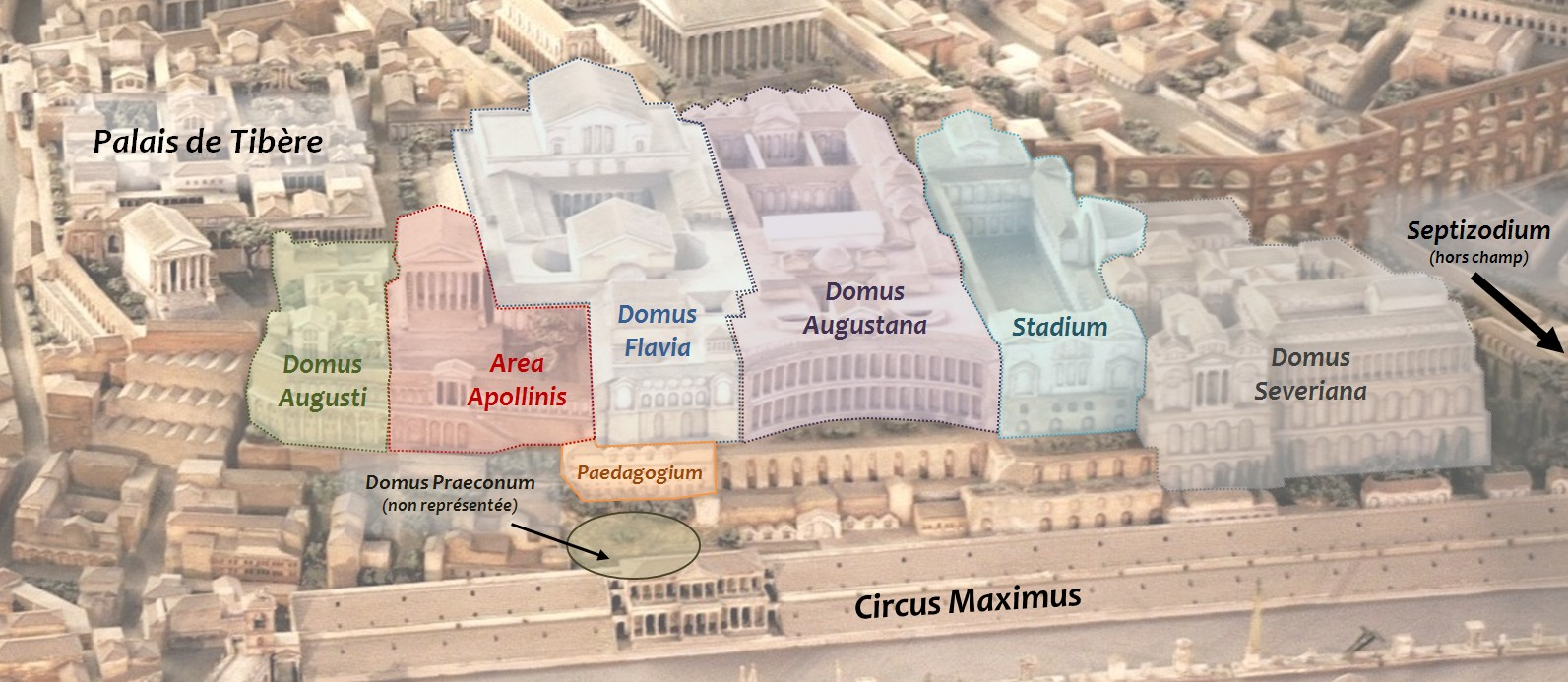
- Plan of the Palatine buildings

- Shown within Augustan Rome
- Interactive map of Domus Augustana
- 41°53′16″N 12°29′12″E

The Domus Augustana is the modern name given to the central residential part of the vast Roman Palace of Domitian (92 AD) on the Palatine Hill. In antiquity the name may have applied to the whole of the palace.

Its name is not directly related to the emperor Augustus (r. 27 BC – AD 14) and should not be confused with the nearby Domus Augusti, but probably refers to the later Roman meaning of Augustus as "emperor".

== Layout ==
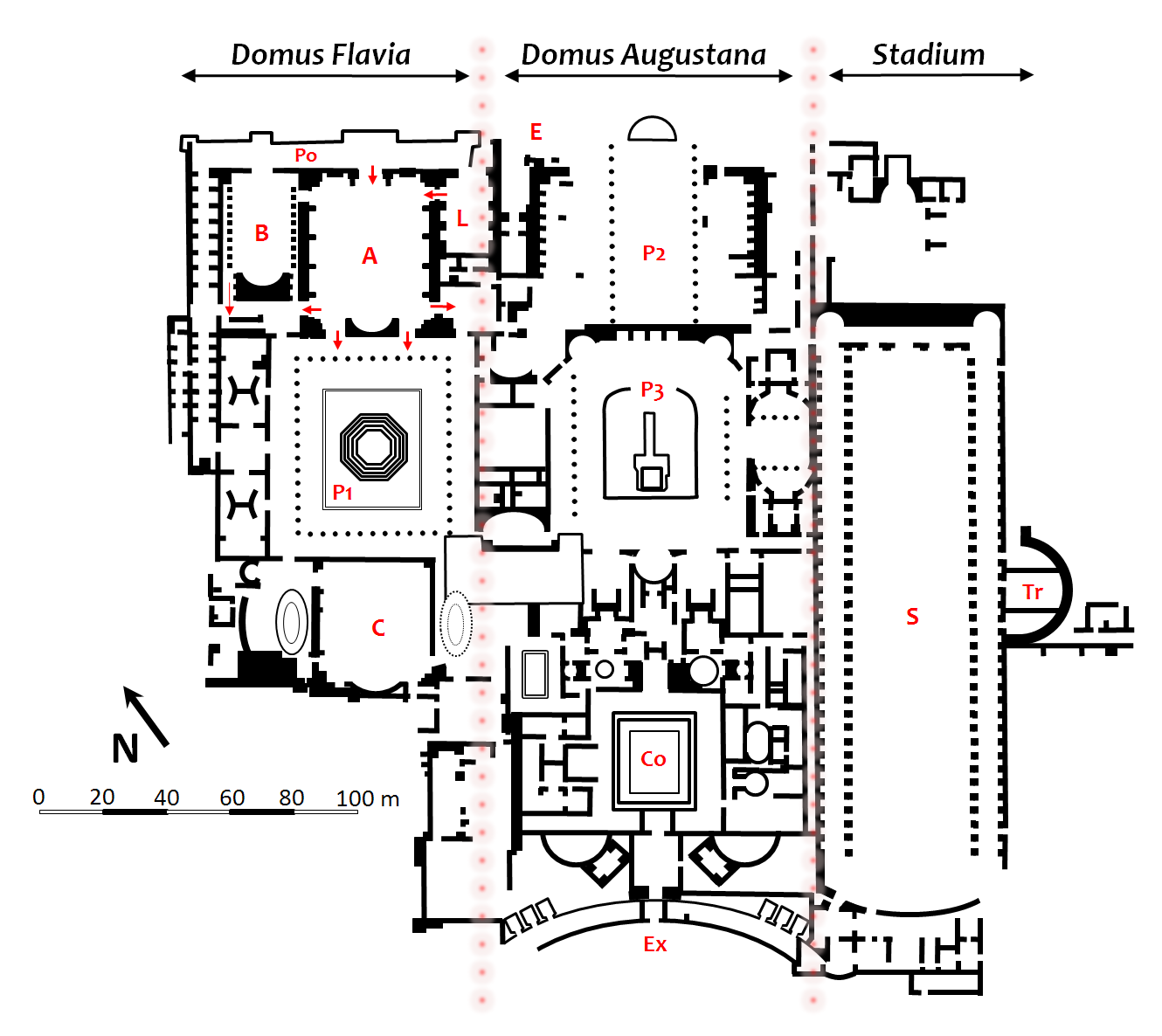
Domus Augustana: P2: 2nd peristyle P3: 3rd peristyle Co: courtyard Ex: grand exedra S: Stadium Tr: Tribune of the Stadium

The central section of the palace (labelled "Domus Augustana" in the diagram) consists of at least four main parts: the "2nd Peristyle" to the northeast, the central "3rd Peristyle", the courtyard complex and the exedra on the southwest. The Domus Augustana is built on two levels, the upper northern one consisting of the two peristyles to the north on the same level and closely linked to the Domus Flavia, the public wing of the palace, and therefore probably having public functions. The southern section was built a little later and some details suggest that it was not Rabirius who directed the work.

The 2nd Peristyle garden is partly exposed but little is known of its architecture.

The 3rd Peristyle was filled almost completely with a huge pool as wide as that of the Domus Flavia and included a seascape perhaps of Greek mythology on an island connected to the side via a bridge with several arches, and with sculptures in the water. Other sources suggest a temple was built on the island, namely a temple of Minerva. The elaborate rooms surrounding the peristyle alternated between open and closed spaces, suited to public use and perhaps several social groups. On its southwest side the walls stand to a considerable height (after partial reconstruction in the 1930s) with several rooms around a semicircular hall.

The courtyard complex was reserved for the private quarters of the emperor and was built around another peristyle garden surrounded by a colonnade on two levels, the upper containing complex sets of rooms and the lower, 10 m below ground level, consisting of a pool with an unusual design of islands consisting of four peltas, typical moon-shaped shields of the Amazons, all surfaces being originally faced with marble.

On the southwest side of this complex is the great exedra, a long curving arcaded gallery linking two wings, overlooking the Circus Maximus to the southwest allowing the emperor to watch the races. It may have had an ornamental façade, perhaps added by Trajan when the seats of the circus were carried up thus far(Gnomon, 1927, p. 593 Verlag C.H.Beck). From this curved terrace a large arched opening, visible in drawings of the sixteenth century (Heemskerck II; Wyngaerde) led into the courtyard complex.

== Gallery ==
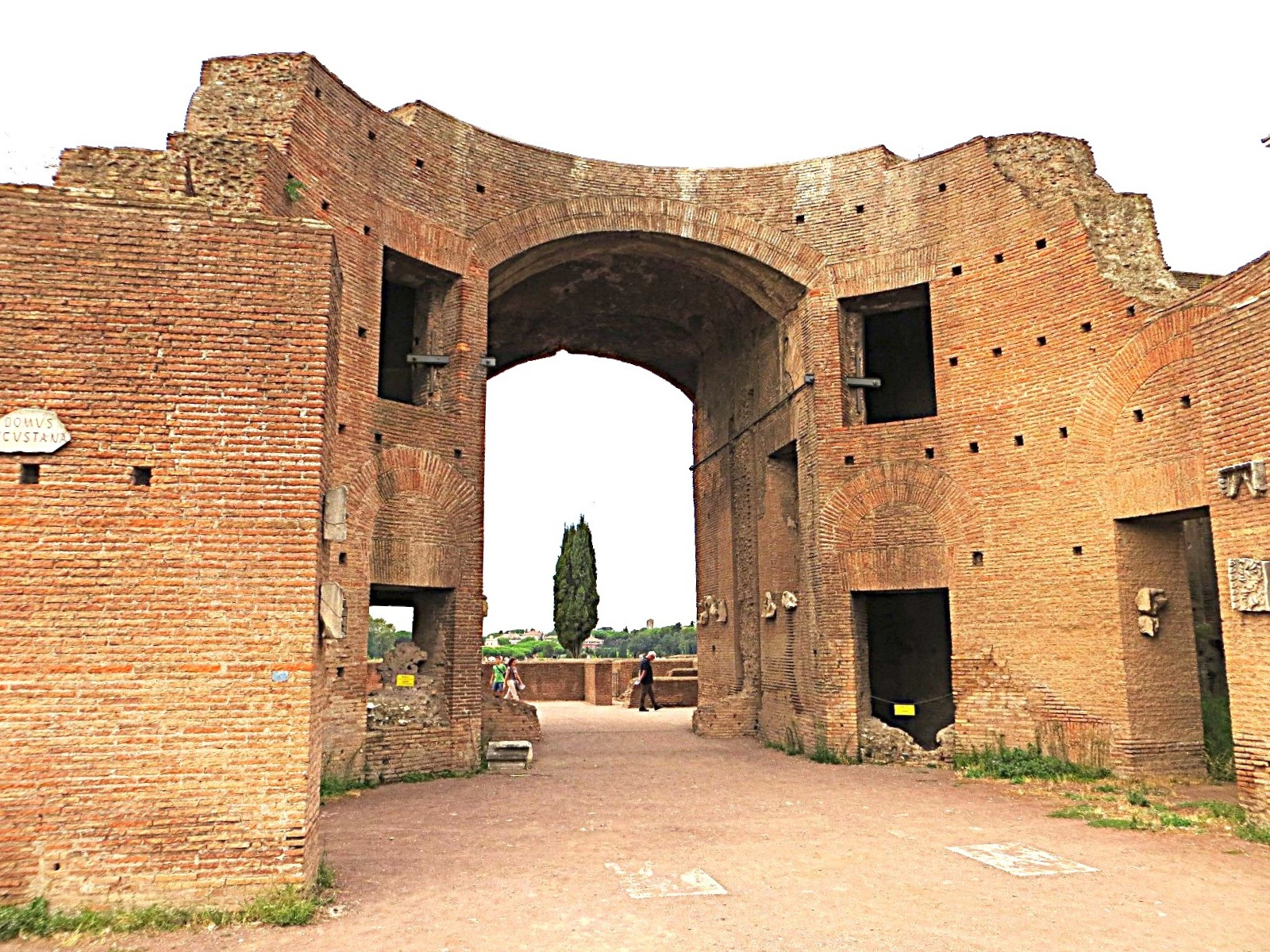
Buildings along NE side of "courtyard" garden

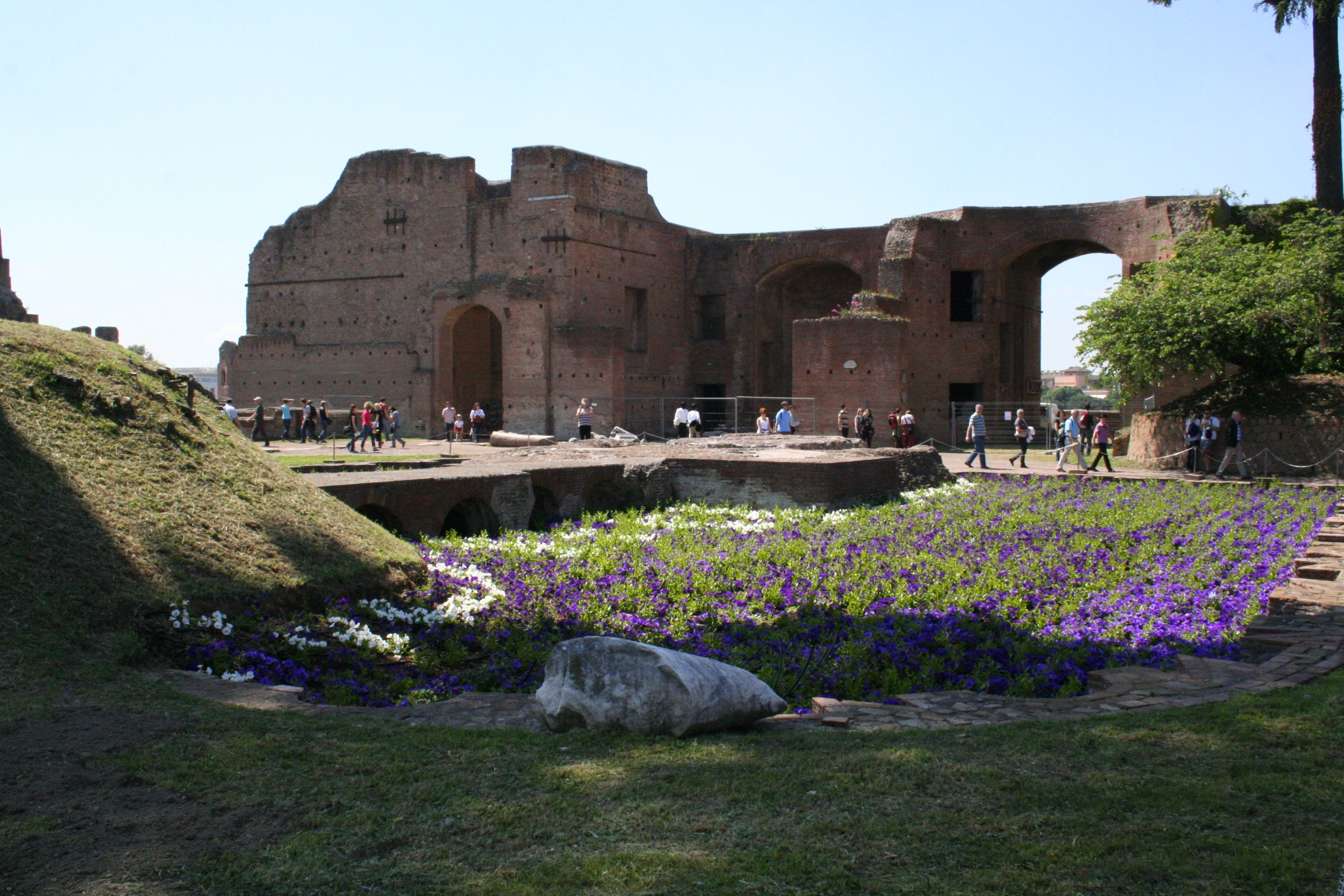
"3rd Peristyle" garden looking south

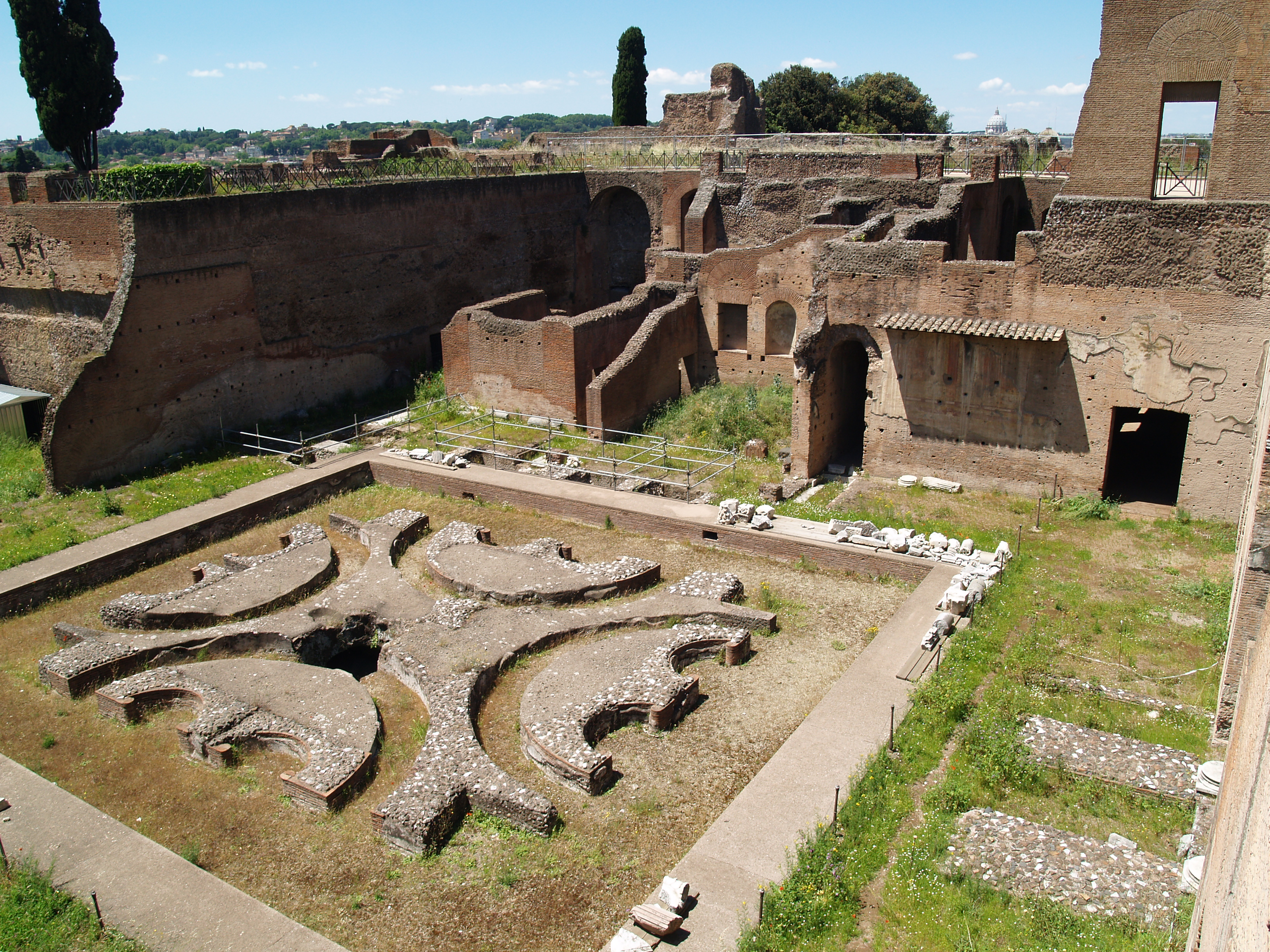
"Courtyard" garden of the Domus Augustana looking west

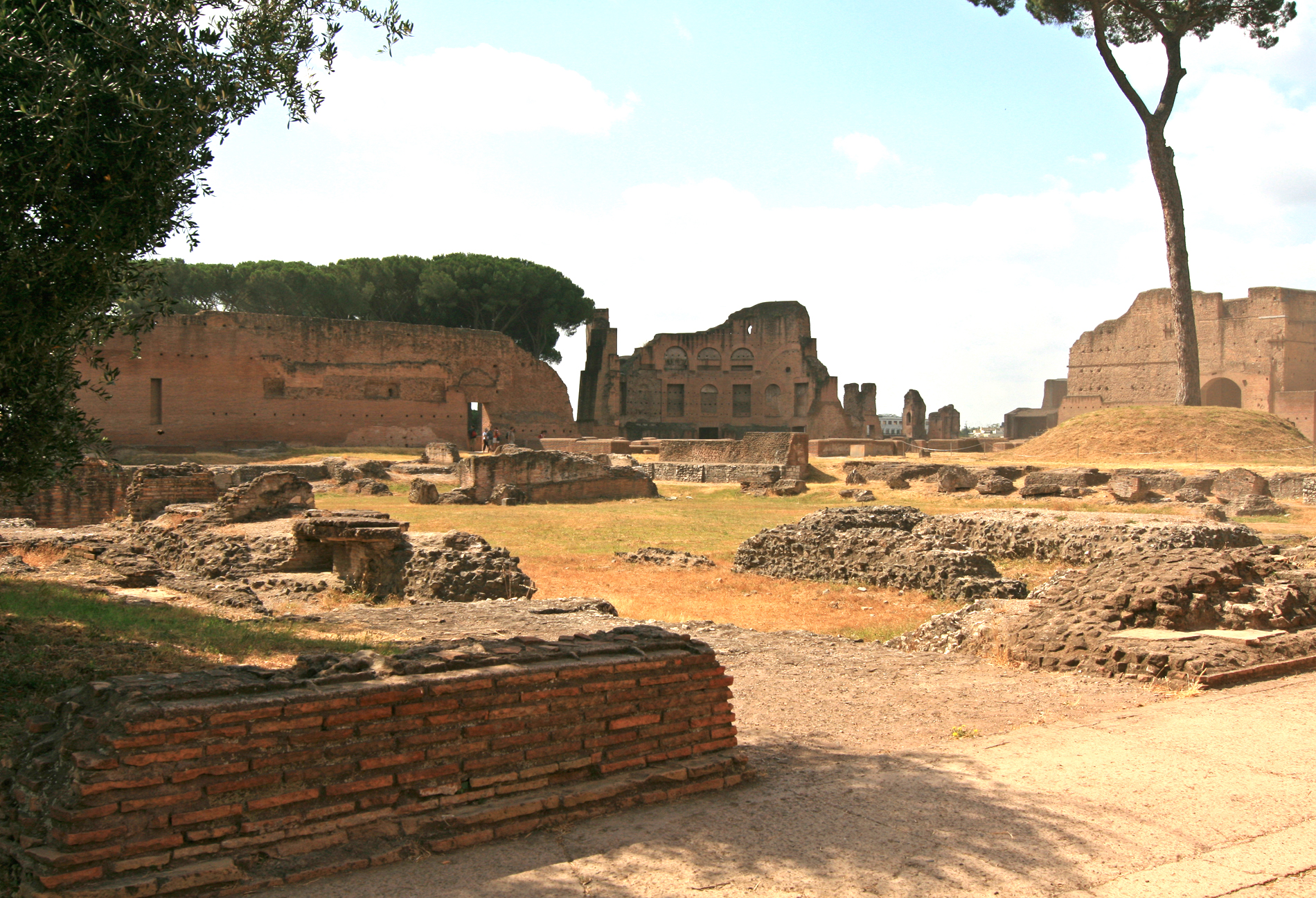
2nd Peristyle garden looking south

== See also ==
- List of ancient monuments in Rome
- Symbolism of domes

== Other sources ==
- Claridge, Amanda (1998). Rome, An Oxford Archaeological Guide. OUP. ISBN 0-19-288003-9.
- A Topographical Dictionary of Ancient Rome, Samuel Ball Platner (as completed and revised by Thomas Ashby):Oxford University Press, 1929

Preceded by Theatre of Pompey	Landmarks of Rome; Domus Augustana	Succeeded by Domus Aurea
