= Casa Romuli =

Reputed home of Romulus

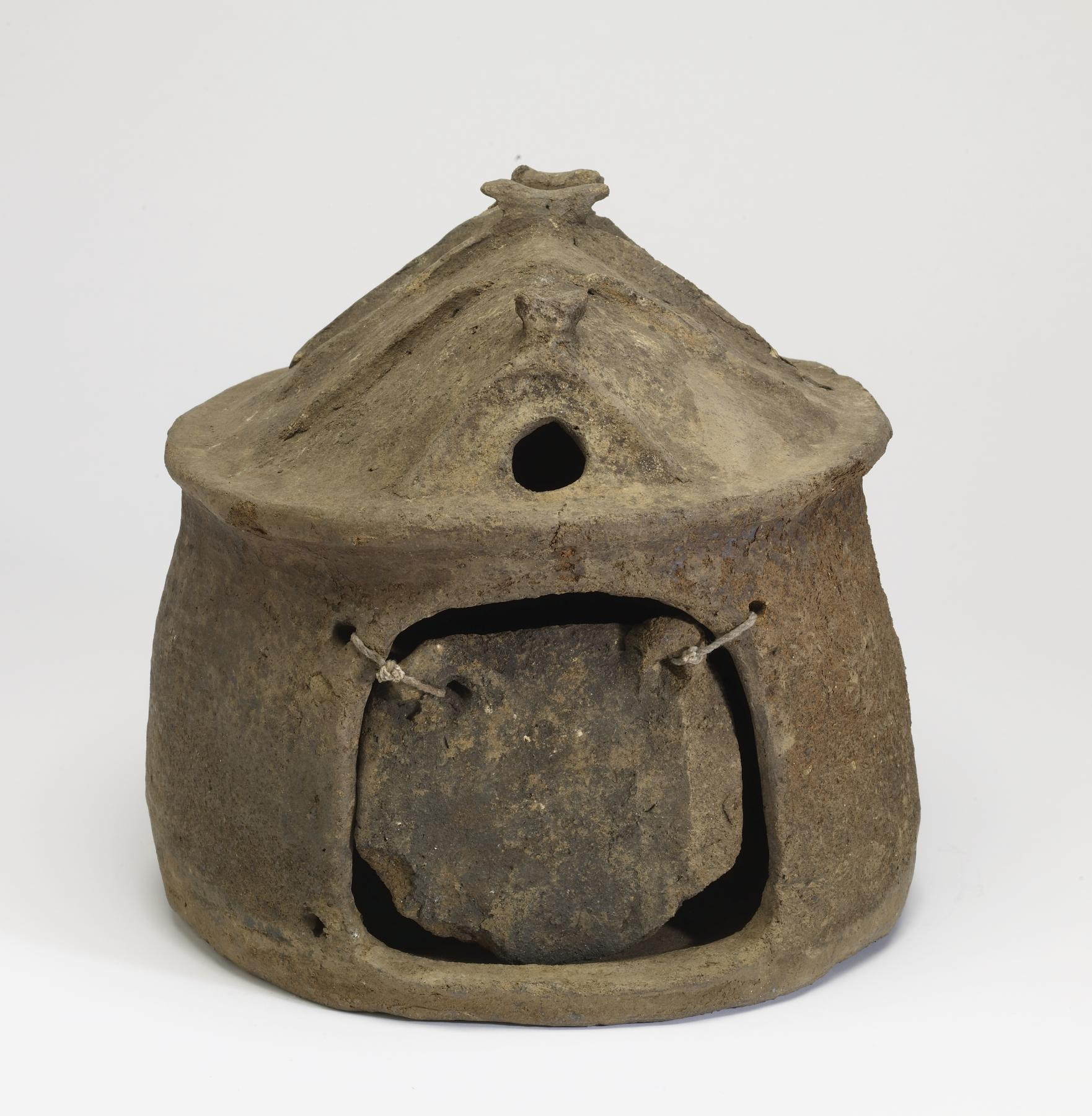
Villanovan culture cinerary hut-urn, showing the likely shape of Romulus' hut in Rome, a simple mud-and-straw shelter

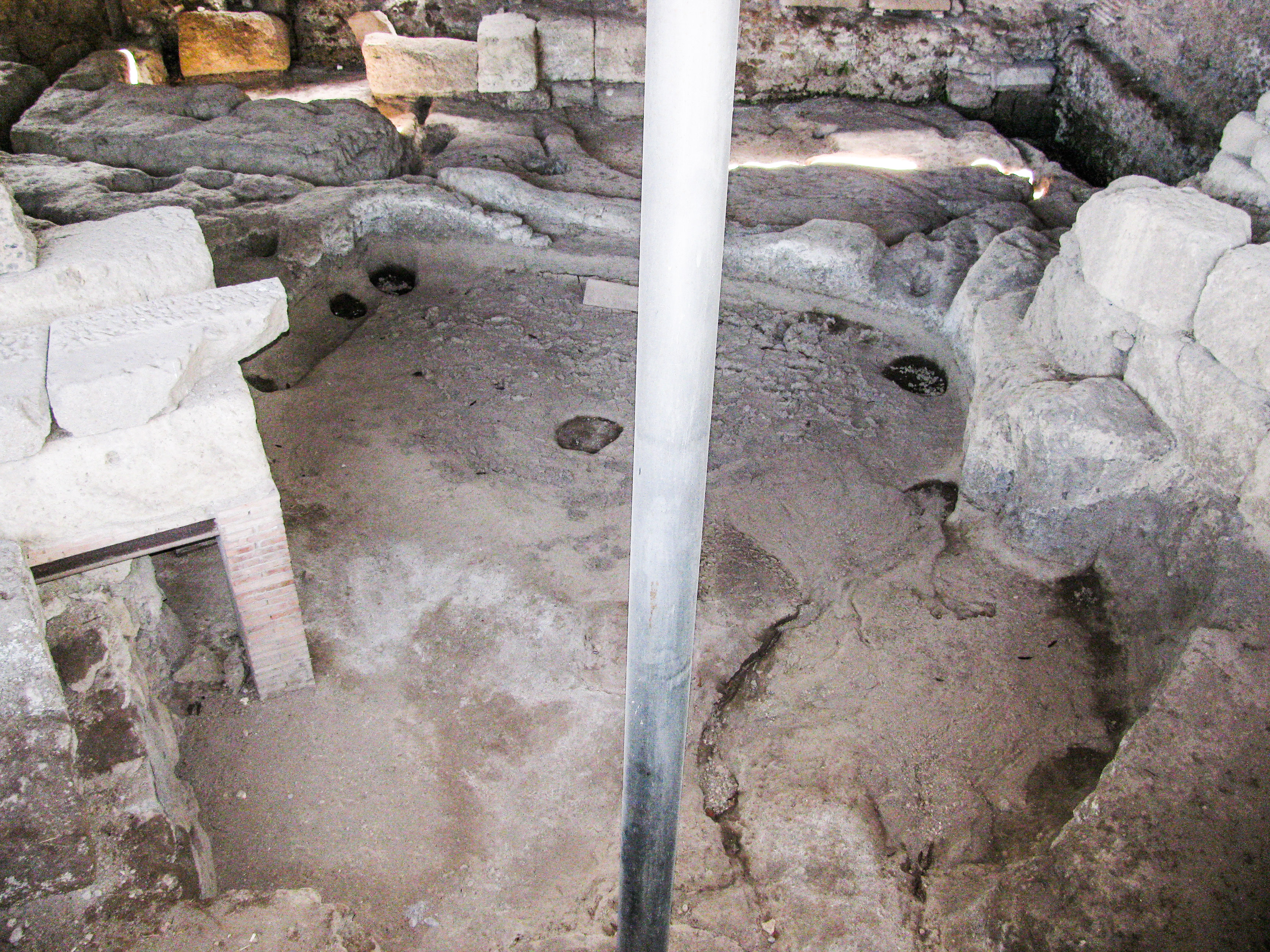
Iron Age hut foundations on the Palatine Hill considered to be the Casa Romuli

The Casa Romuli ("Hut of Romulus"), also known as the tugurium Romuli, was the reputed dwelling place of the legendary founder and first king of Rome, Romulus (traditional dates 771–717 BC). It was situated on the south-western corner of the Palatine Hill, where it slopes down towards the Circus Maximus, near the so-called "Steps of Cacus". It was a traditional single-roomed peasants' hut of the Latins, with straw roof and wattle-and-daub walls, such as are reproduced in miniature in the distinctive funerary urns of the so-called Latial culture (ca. 1000 – ca. 600 BC).

== In Roman records ==
Over the centuries, the casa was repeatedly damaged by fire and storms, but carefully restored to its original state on each occasion. Destruction by fire is recorded for 38 BC, as a result of a ceremony held inside the casa by the pontifices ("College of High Priests"), presumably a burnt sacrifice to Romulus in his deified state as the god Quirinus, during which the altar-fire probably ran out of control. The last recorded fire was in 12 BC, on the death of Marcus Vipsanius Agrippa, right-hand man of the first Roman emperor, Augustus (ruled 30 BC – AD 14). On this occasion, the casa was apparently set on fire by some crows which dropped pieces of burning meat, again snatched from an altar, onto the thatched roof. It has been speculated that a tugurium Faustini ("the cottage of Faustinus") on the Palatine recorded in the time of the emperor Constantine I (ruled AD 312–337) was in reality the still surviving casa Romuli.

A second casa Romuli is recorded in the classical sources, on the Capitoline Hill, likely a replica of the original. It is last mentioned in AD 78.

To date, archaeologists have been unable to definitively associate the casa Romuli with any extant remains. A strong candidate is the largest of a group of dwellings whose foundations were unearthed in the appropriate location during excavations in 1946. The dwelling's foundations were cut into the tufa bedrock, with an ovoid 4.9m X 3.6m perimeter. Six post-holes arranged in a circle of which one in the centre were presumably to accommodate the supporting struts for walls and roof respectively. Organic material found in the site has been dated to the Italian early Iron Age (ca. 900–700 BC).

== See also ==
- Romulus and Remus
- Lupercal
- Latins (Italic tribe)
