= Rabirius (architect) =

1st century AD Roman architect

Rabirius was an ancient Roman architect who lived during the 1st and 2nd centuries CE. His designs included the massive Flavian Palace, situated on the Palatine Hill at Rome, and the Alban Villa at present-day Castel Gandolfo, both erected on a commission by his patron, emperor Domitian.

It has been suggested that Rabirius designed the extant Arch of Titus, a commemorative arch located in summa Sacra Via honoring the joint triumph celebrated by Titus and Vespasian marking their successful suppression of the Jewish Revolt in 71 CE. An even more intriguing suggestion is that if Rabirius was indeed the Flavians' preferred architect, it is conceivable that it was he who designed the most famous Roman building of them all: the Flavian Amphitheatre
