= Futamura =

Futamura (Japanese: 二村) is a Japanese surname. Notable people with the surname include:

- Ai Futamura (二村 愛; born 1976), Japanese actress
- Fumiko Futamura, Japanese-American mathematician
- Haruka Futamura (二村 春香; born 1996), Japanese former member of the SKE48
- Shingo Futamura (born 1938), Japanese rubber industry materials scientist
- Tadami Futamura (二村 忠美; born 1959), Japanese baseball player
- Teiichi Futamura (二村 定一; 1900-1948), Japanese singer and actor
- Yoshihiko Futamura, Japanese computer scientist
- Yoshimi Futamura (born 1959), Japanese-French ceramic artist
