= Domus Transitoria =

Ancient palace in Rome

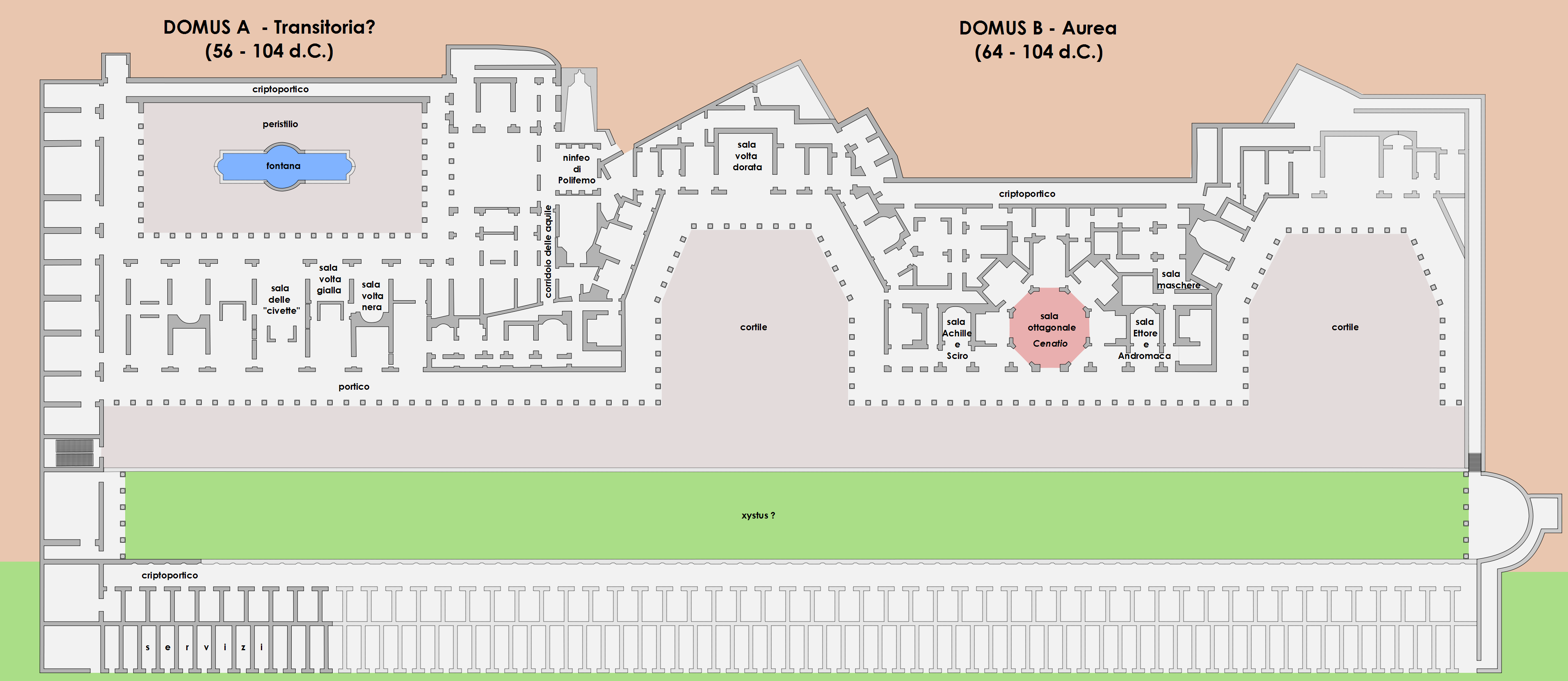
- Plan of part of the Domus Transitoria with the later Domus Aurea

- Shown within Augustan Rome
- Interactive map of Domus Transitoria
- 41°53′N 12°29′E

The Domus Transitoria (House of Passage) was Roman emperor Nero's (r. 54 – 68) first palace damaged or destroyed by the Great Fire of Rome in 64 AD, and then extended by his Domus Aurea (or Golden House).

== History ==
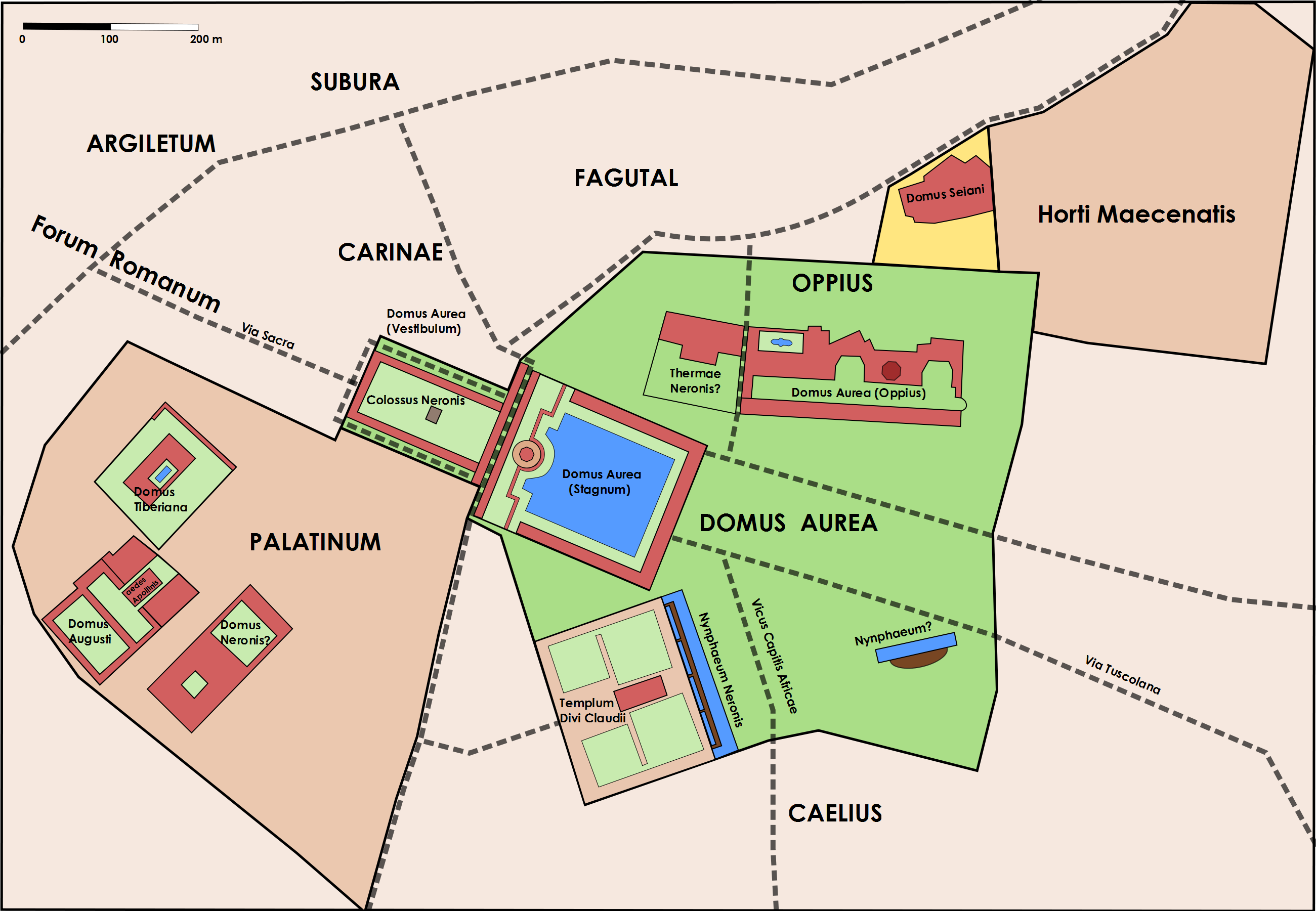
Domus Transitoria/Aurea plan

The "domus" estate was intended to connect the Palatine palace with all of the imperial estates that had been acquired in various ways, including the Gardens of Maecenas, Horti Lamiani, Horti Lolliani, etc.

According to Suetonius (Nero 31.1): "He built a palace extending all the way from the Palatine to the Esquiline, which at first he called the Domus Transitoria, but when it was burned down shortly after its completion and rebuilt, the Golden House".

It was probably built from AD 60.

== Layout ==
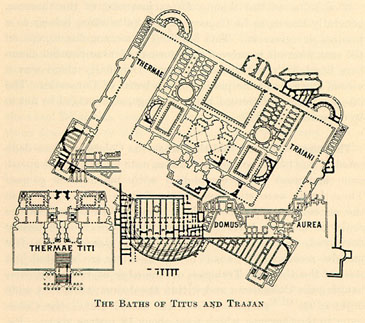
Plan of imperial baths with underlying Domus Transitoria

=== Oppian Hill ===
One of the main buildings is thought to be on the western side of the Oppian Hill under the Baths of Trajan.

The brick walls of the palace were originally covered with marble at the bottom, while the upper parts were frescoed. A portico fronted the domus along the south side. Almost all of the columns, floors and marble walls were removed when Trajan built his baths (in 104 AD).

The house was built around a big peristyle with porticos on three sides, while the fourth on the north consisted of a cryptoporticus which supported the rear embankment. At the centre, occupied now by a series of long barrel vaults to support the overlying Trajanic baths are the remains of a fountain; on the eastern part is a large nymphaeum that opens to the courtyard.

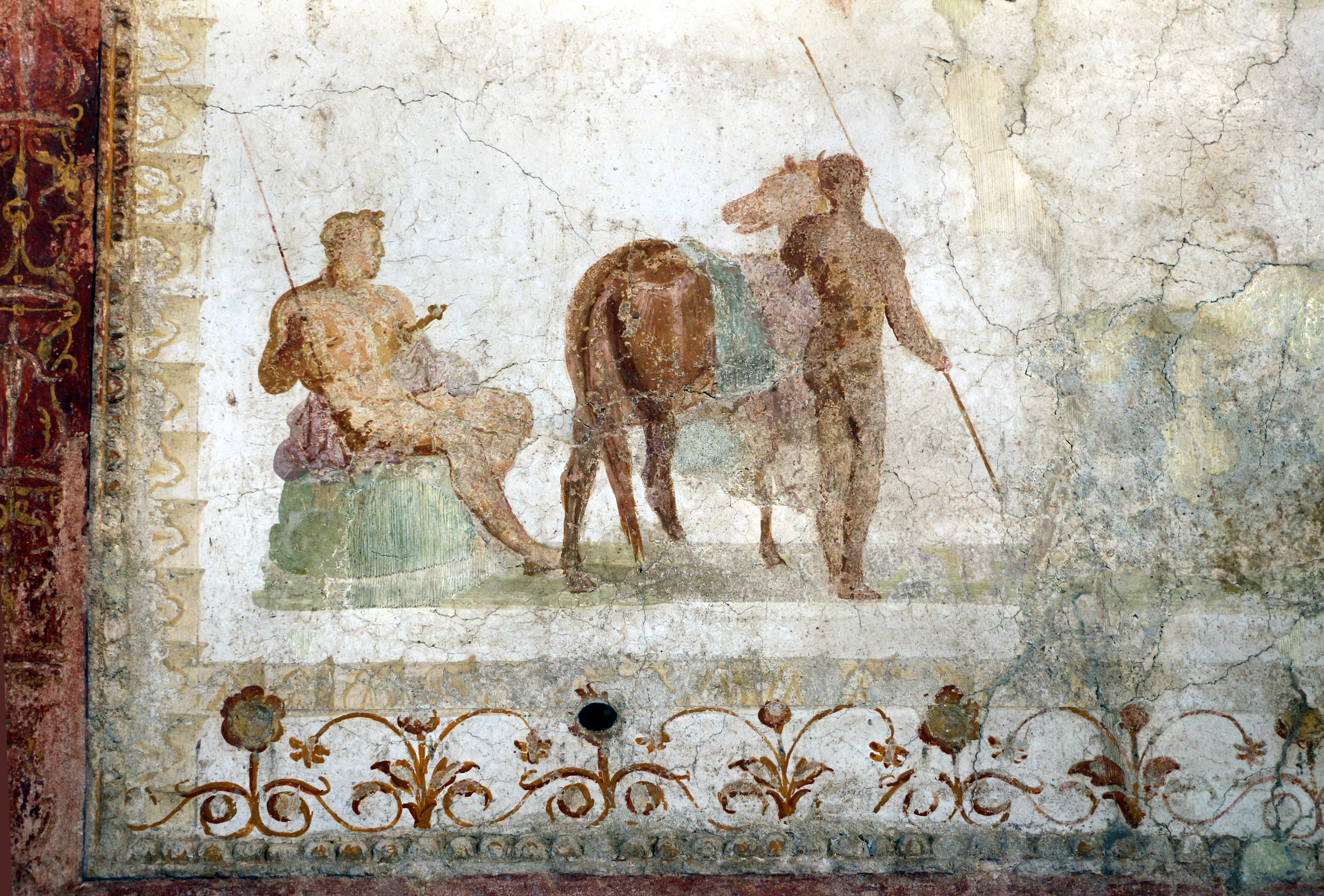
Fresco from the nymphaeum of the domus transitoria, 54–64 AD

==== Nymphaeum of Polyphemus ====
An elaborate nympheum was unfortunately divided in two by a later wall of Trajan. Surrounded by a portico of four columns it was equipped with a cascading fountain on the bottom, whose water was conveyed into a central basin. On the walls of the grotto was a mosaic of which a few traces remain within a frame of shells. The lower part of the walls were originally covered in marble. A granite urn that was made in Roman Egypt, presumably Alexandria was discovered in the chamber in 1721.

The decoration of the vault, 10 m (33 ft) high, is preserved only in part where four corner medallions and a central octagon were inserted, the latter partly preserved representing the Polyphemus scene.

=== Temple of Venus and Roma ===
Five metres below Hadrian's Temple of Venus and Roma a sumptuous rotunda belonging to the palace was discovered in 1828, cut through by foundations of the Domus Aurea. The elaborate domed room which interconnected two barrel-vaulted corridors was spectacular architecturally and had marble-lined pools and paving in multicoloured opus sectile, all still largely intact beneath the temple.

=== Palatine Hill ===
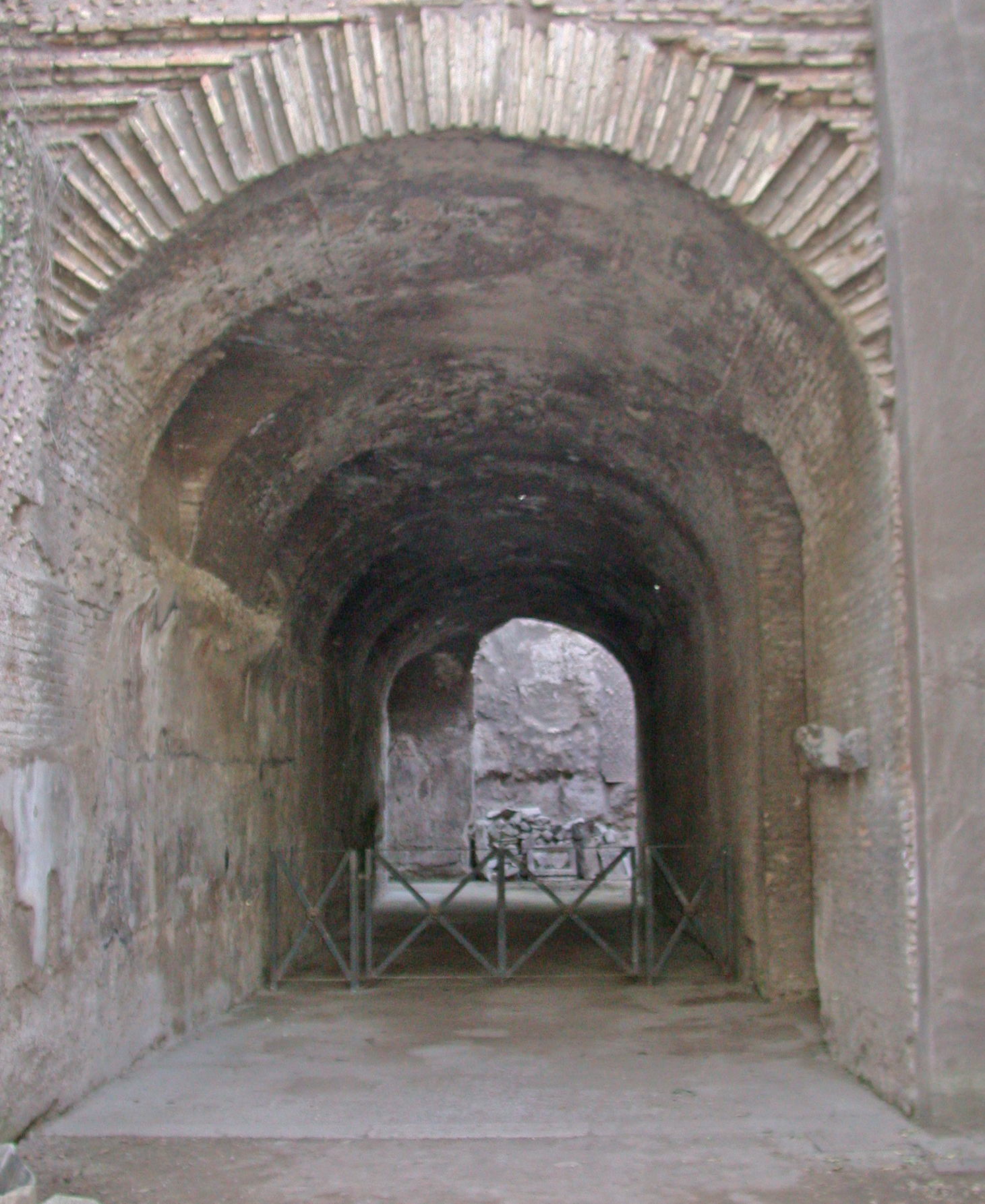
Cryptoporticus of Nero, Palatine

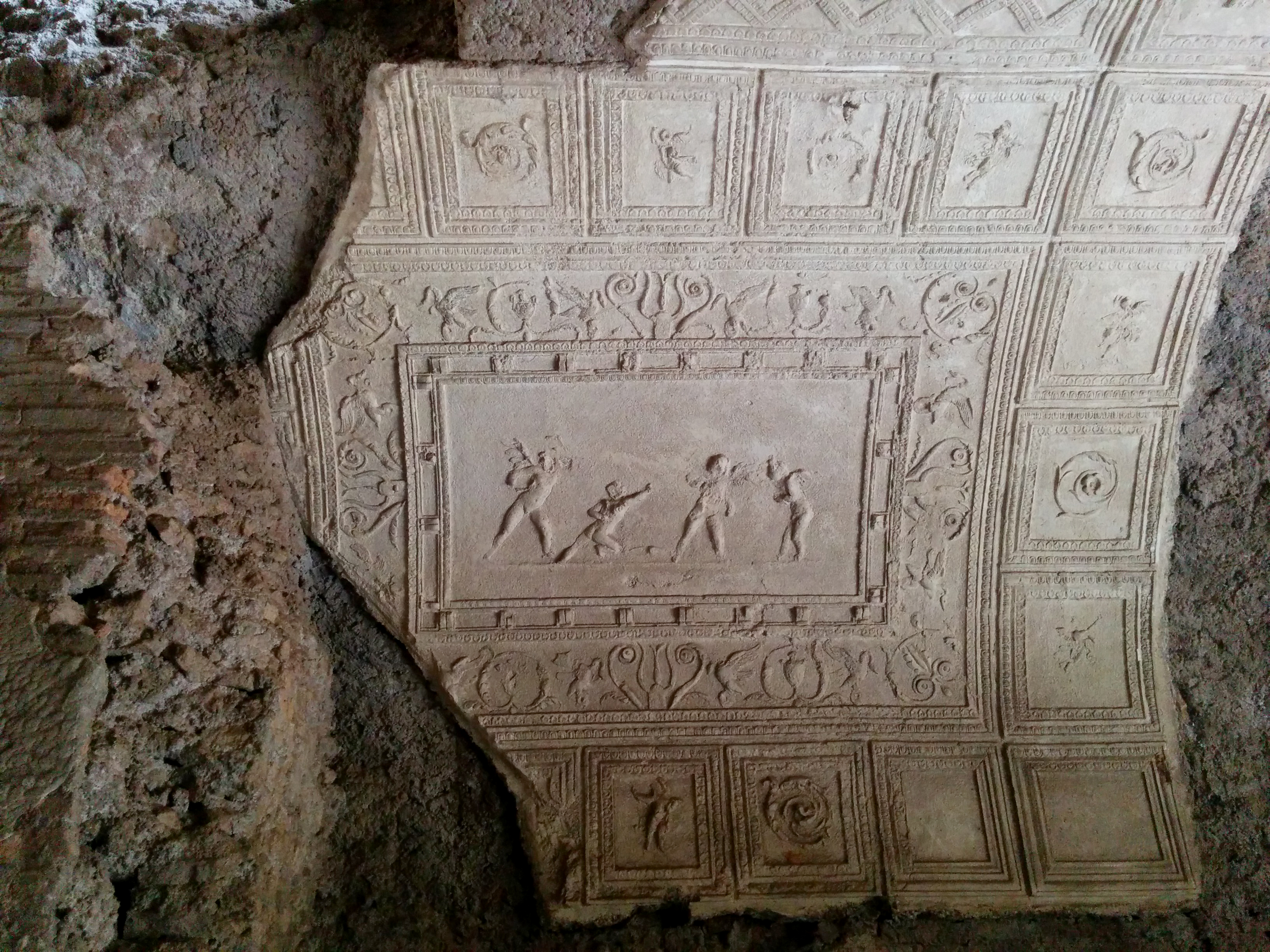
Stucco ceiling in the Cryptoporticus of Nero

The main part of the palace was probably on the Palatine Hill and a large and brilliantly decorated set of rooms has been located in the central part of the Palatine Hill under the Palace of Domitian. This site was excavated in 1721 when considerable damage was done during the excavations. The lower floors contained sunken gardens, two pavilions, a nymphaeum, and an art gallery. Beyond these rooms is a very large latrine.

In one of these rooms is a rich marble floor found under the oval fountain room of Domitian's Cenatio Iovis, and a rich nymphaeum with marble columns and bronze capitals. Today one corner of the nymphaeum has been rebuilt.

The cryptoporticus of Nero that connected the palace with the nearby Domus Tiberiana was also part of the complex. It is 130 m long with mosaic floors and elaborate stucco ceiling decoration with vegetal elements and cupids. It lies beneath the Horti Farnesiani along one side of the Domus Tiberiana.

Marble and other parts salvaged from the ruins later became part of the Domus Aurea, Nero's main residence.

Painted ceilings with mythological scenes from the Domus Transitoria, the earliest examples of fourth-style painting, perhaps by the painter Fabullus, are displayed in the Palatine Museum.

In 2019 it was announced that this part of the palace will be accessible to the public for the first time in almost 70 years.

== Gallery ==
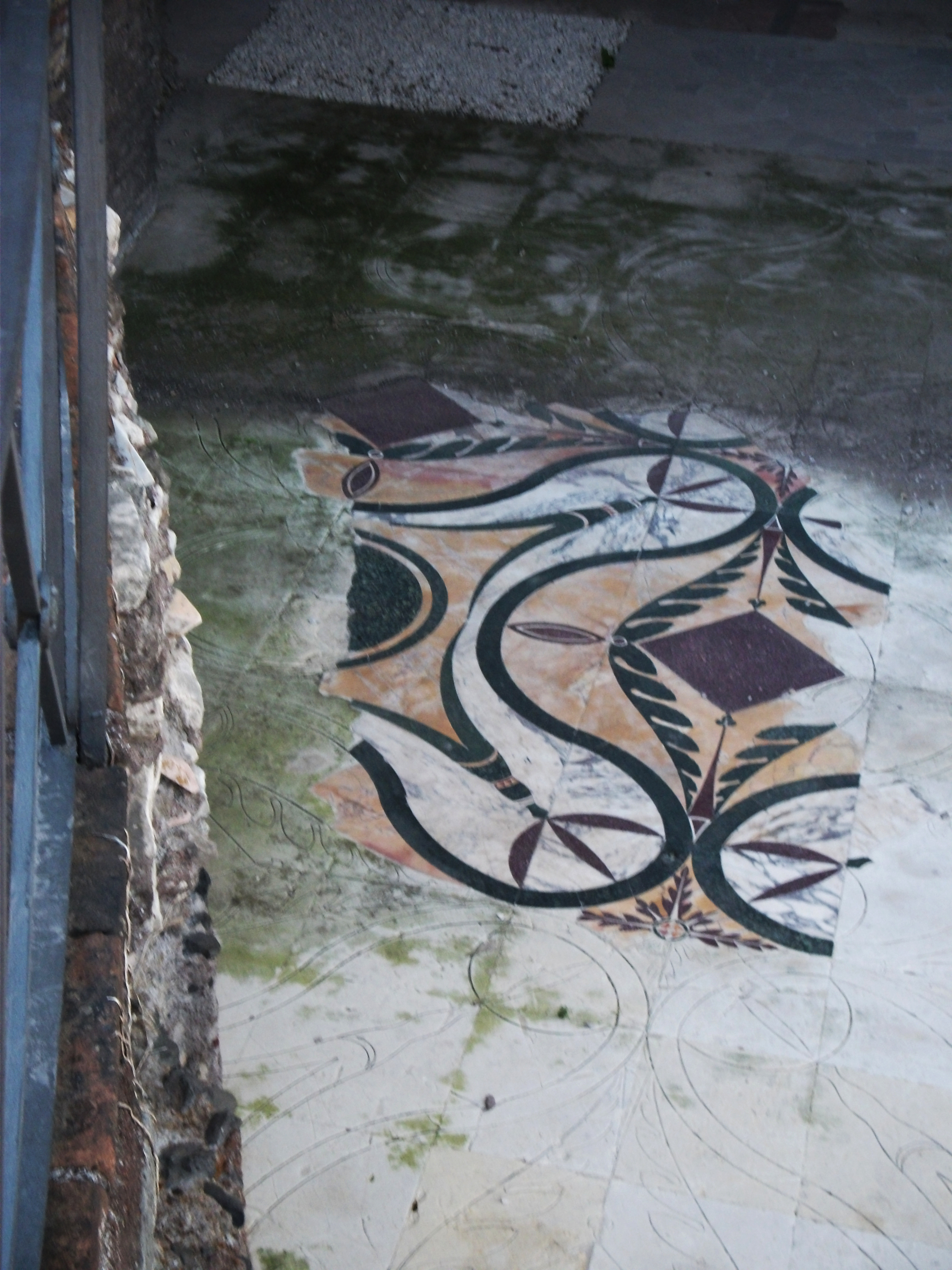

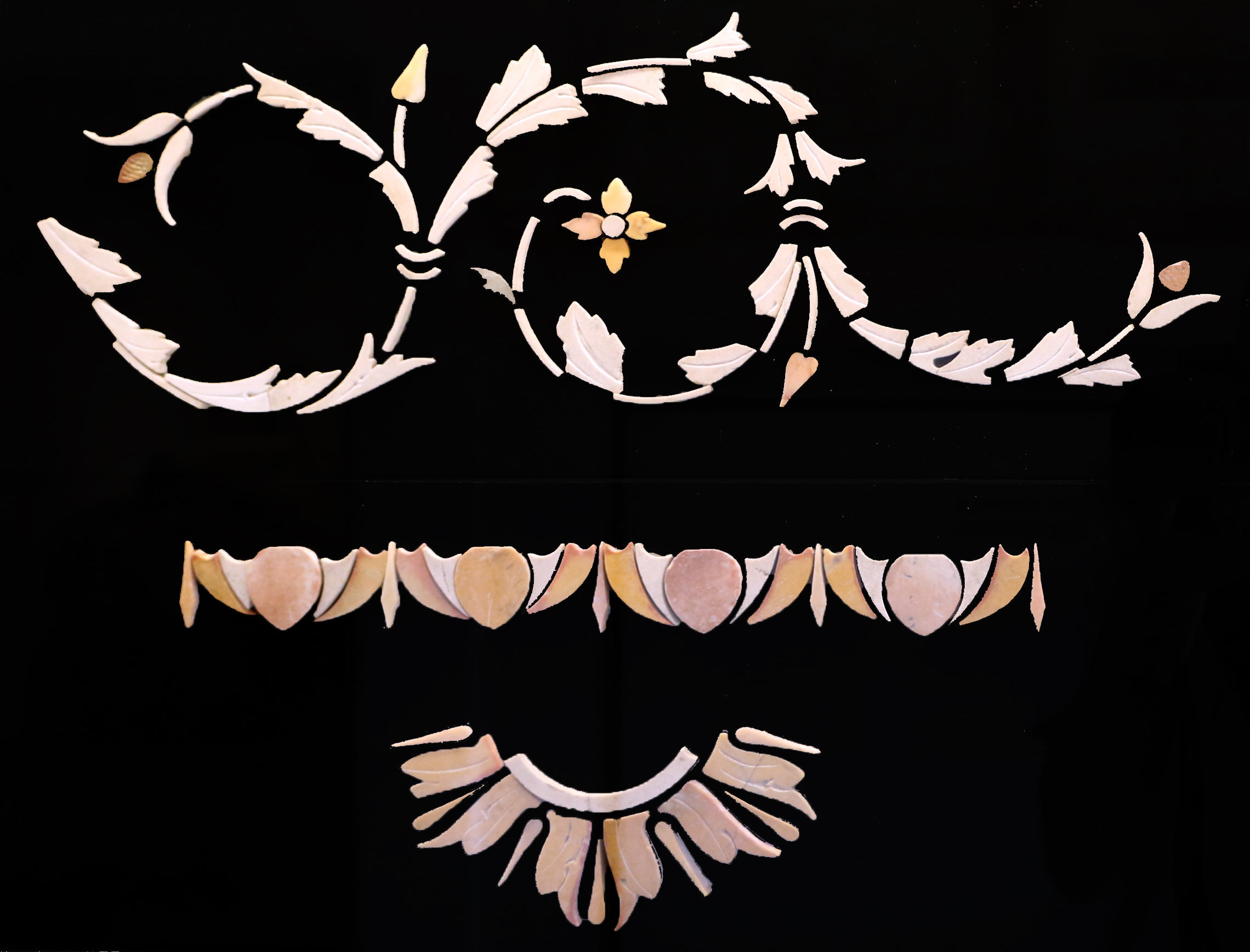
opus sectile from the triclinium (Antiquarium)

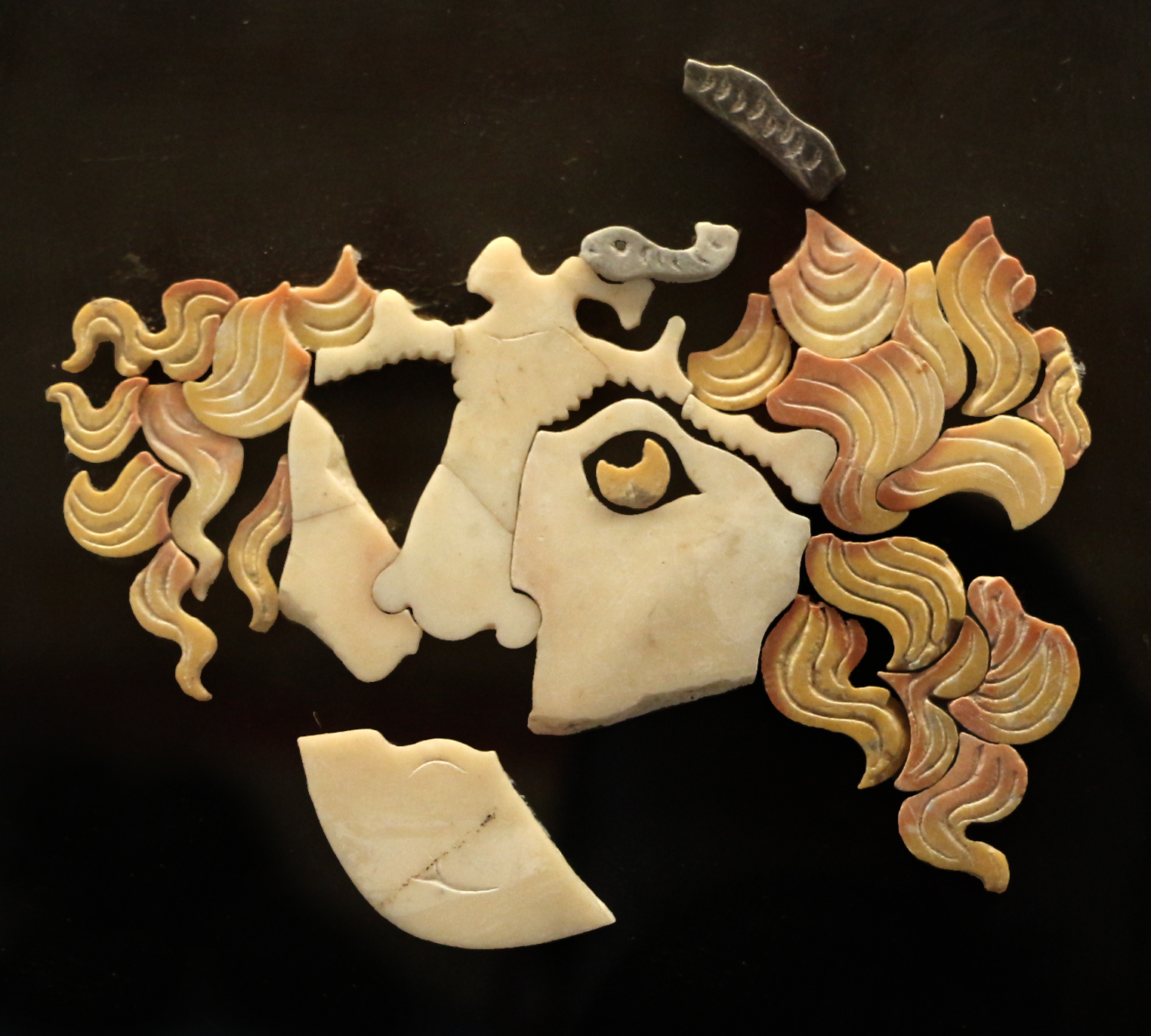
opus sectile from the triclinium (Antiquarium)

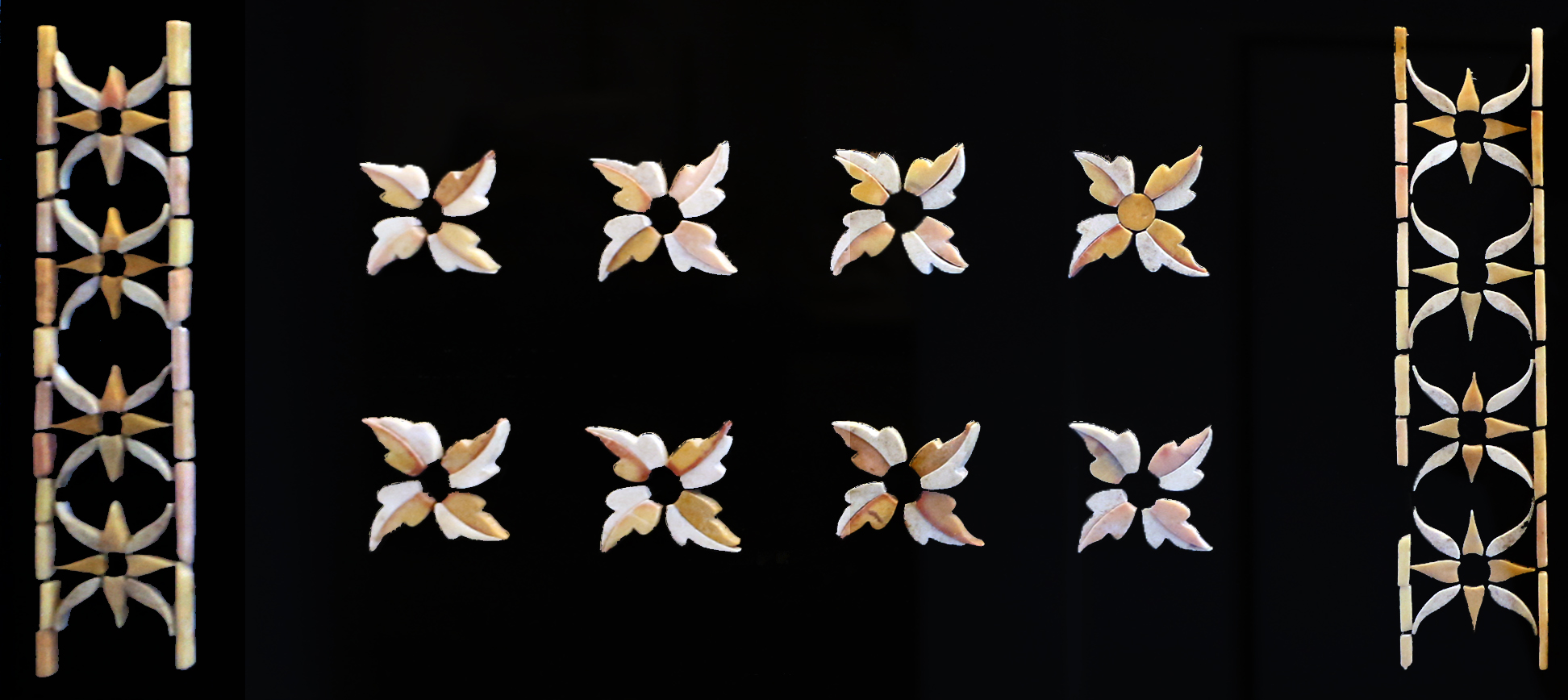
opus sectile from the triclinium (Antiquarium)

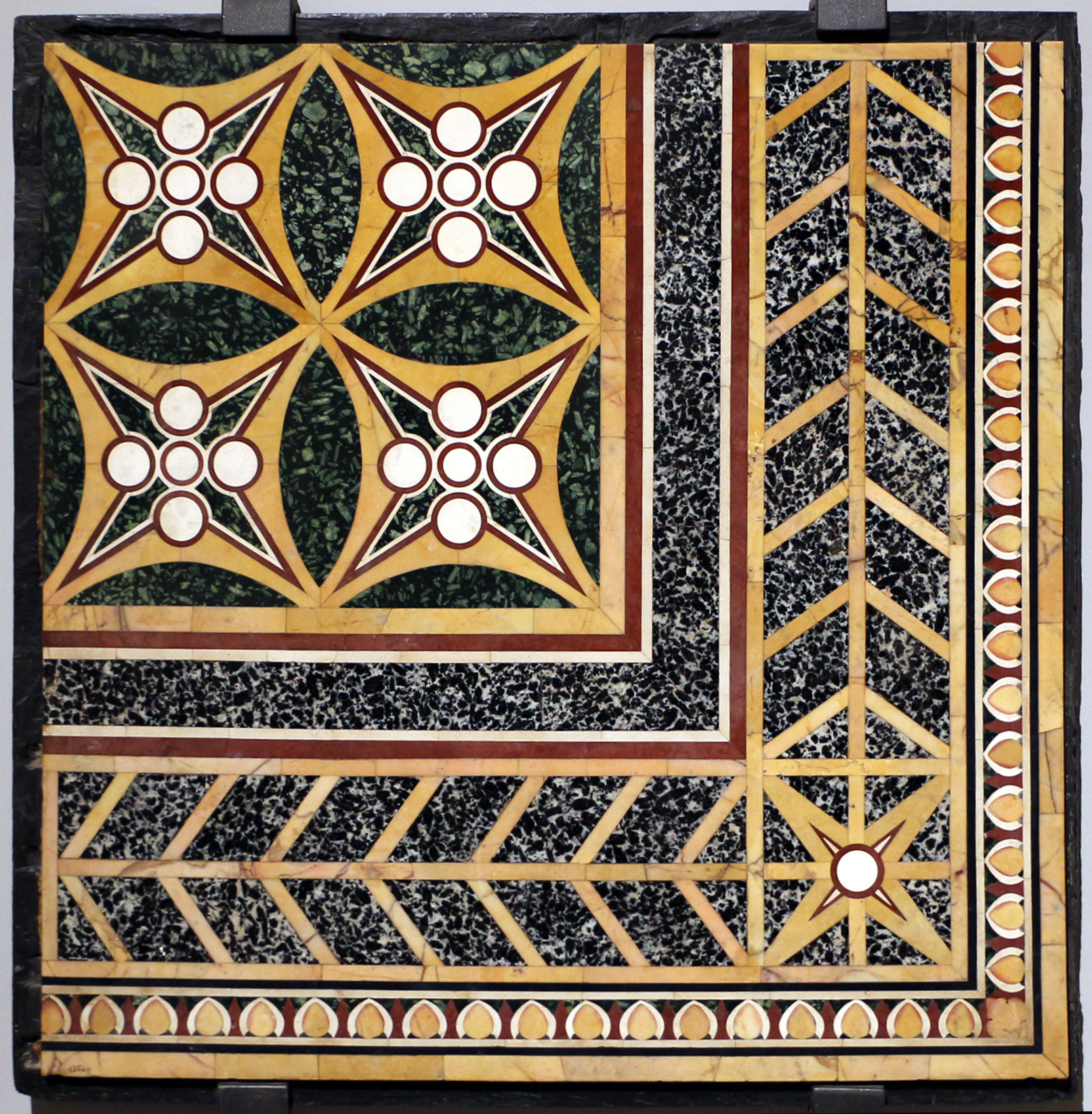
opus sectile from the triclinium (Antiquarium)

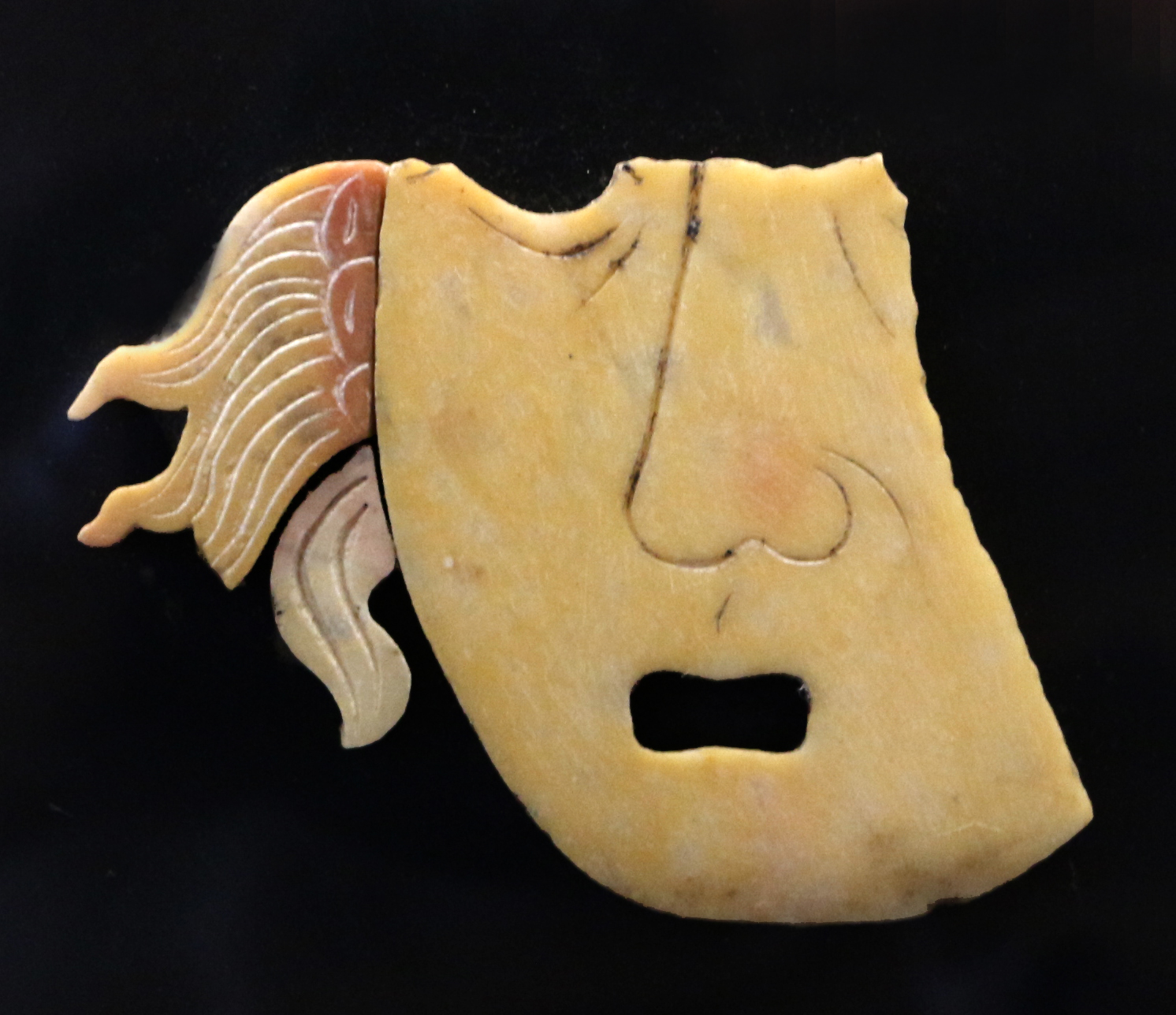
opus sectile from the triclinium (Antiquarium)

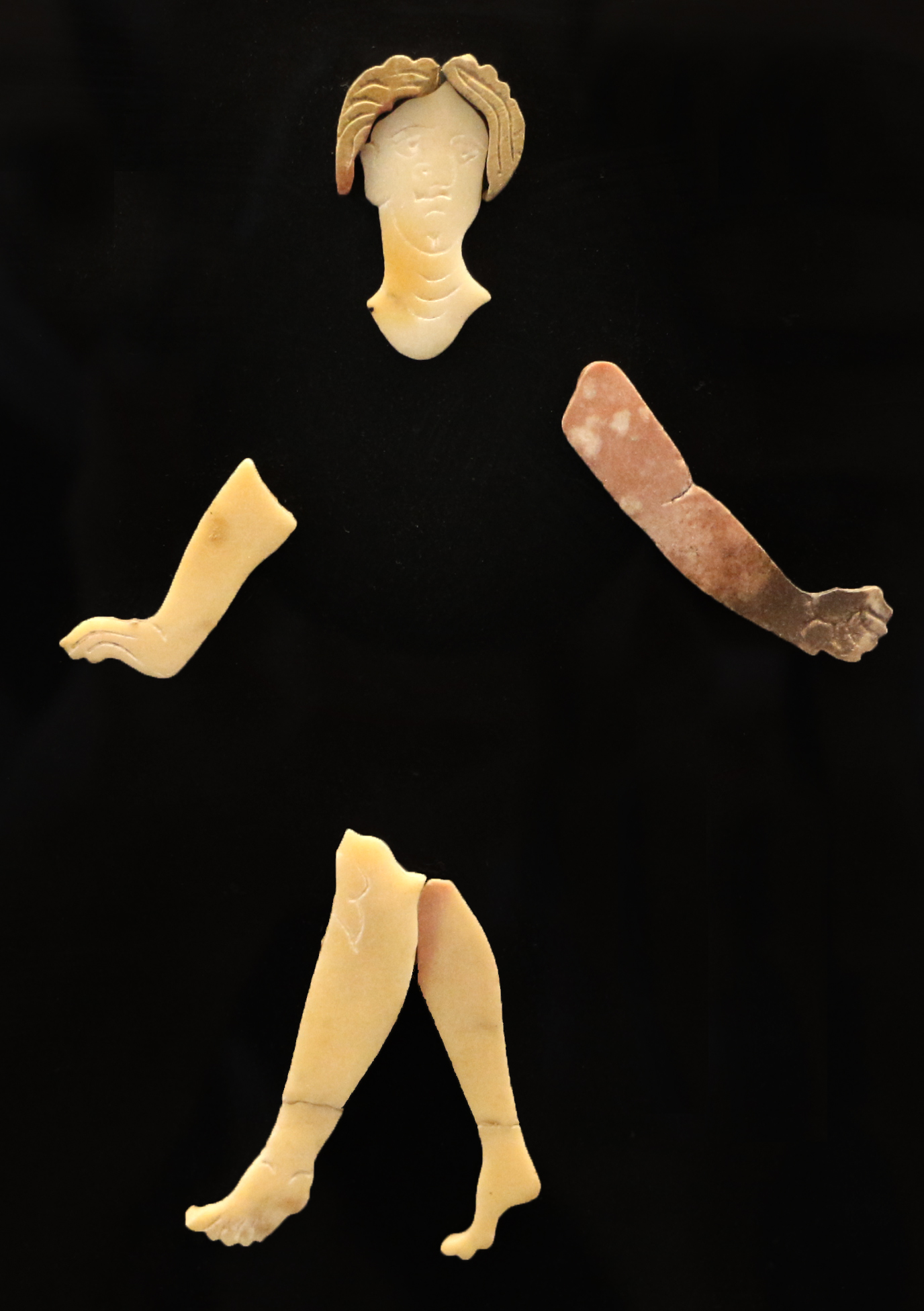
Dancer in marble from the triclinium

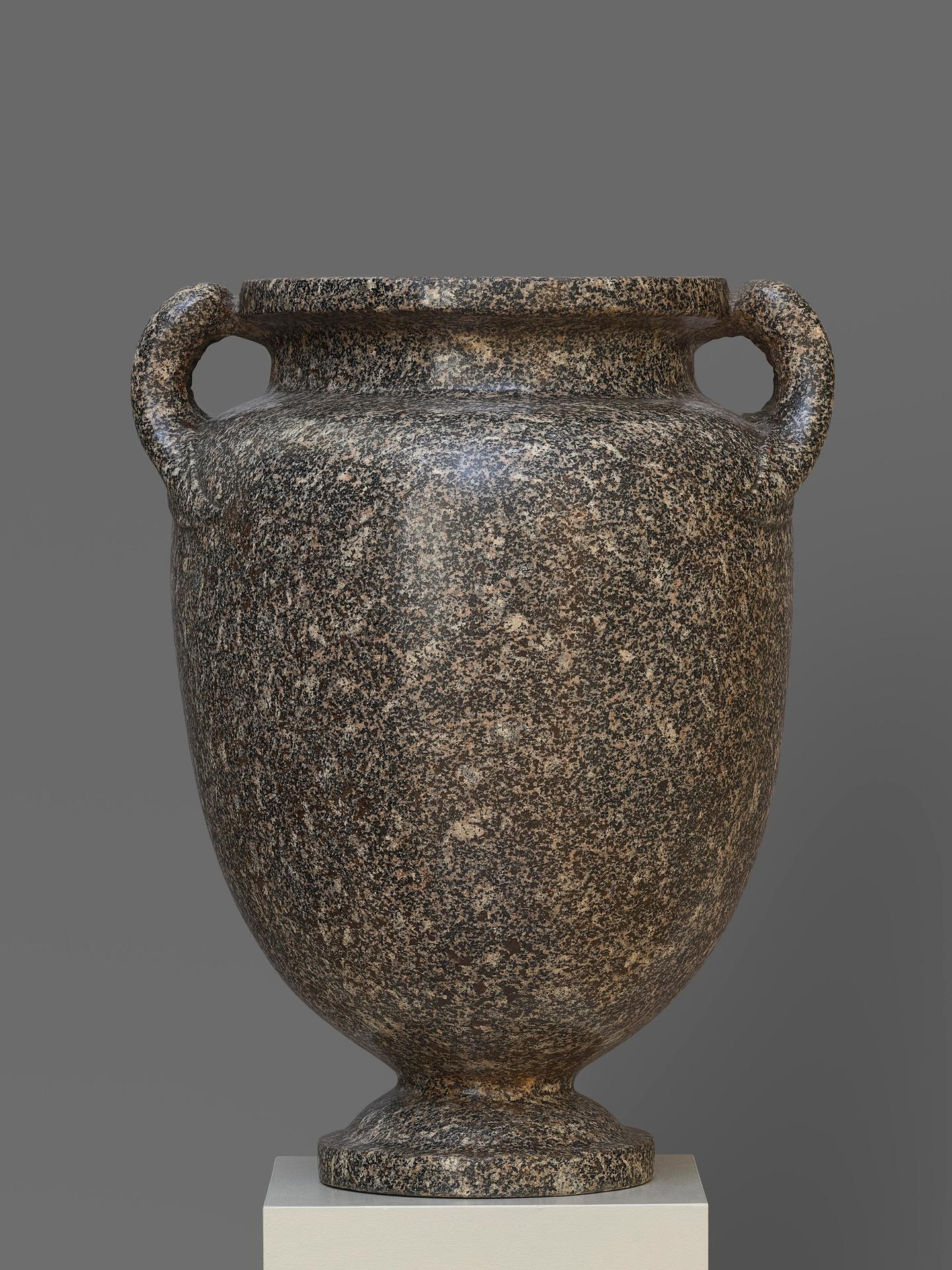
Nero's Urn, Roman Egypt, Yale University Art Gallery (nymphaeum)

== See also ==
- List of ancient monuments in Rome

Preceded by Domus Aurea	Landmarks of Rome; Domus Transitoria	Succeeded by Flavian Palace
