= Nero's Urn =

A Roman-Egyptian granite vase commissioned by Nero for the Domus Transitoria palace

Nero's Urn (Domus Transitoria Urn)
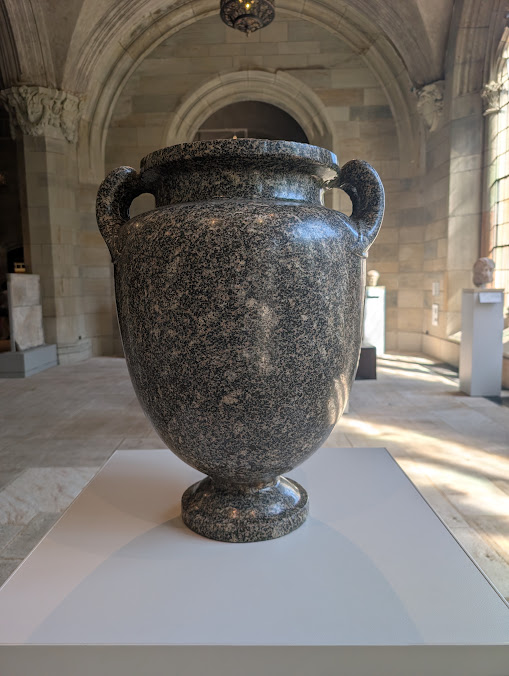
- The Urn on Display in the Ancient Arts Gallery at Yale University Art Gallery (July 2026)
- Type: decorative art
- Material: Granite
- Height: 68.5 cm (27.0 in)
- Width: 52 cm (20 in)
- Weight: 46 cm (18 in)
- Created: 60-64 AD
- Period/culture: Roman Egypt, Julio-Claudian dynasty
- Discovered: 1721; Domus Transitoria, Palatine Hill, Rome
- Present location: Yale University Art Gallery
- Identification: 2026.39.1
- https://artgallery.yale.edu/collections/objects/359586

Nero's Urn, or the Domus Transitoria Urn, is a 1st-century AD Aswan granite monumental urn that served as a decorative piece to Nero's palace at Domus Transitoria, on the Palatine Hill of Rome. Discovered in the 18th century, it served as the decorative piece in multiple British estates, primarily the Parkstead House in London, and Castle Howard in Yorkshire, before residing at the Yale University Art Gallery's Ancient Art collection in 2026 onwards, to which it has been recognized as an artifact admired for centuries.

== Provenance ==
The quarries of Aswan, Egypt served as a major source of granite throughout the course of Antiquity from the Old Kingdom to Greco-Roman Egypt, with significant examples including Djoser's sarcophagus.

From records by Suetonius, prior to the construction of the more famous Domus Aurea by Nero, the emperor had another residence, the Domus Transitoria (House of Passage) under construction over a period of four years from 60-64 AD, prior to the discontinuation on the project due to the Great Fire of Rome. In this period of construction, the vessel was commissioned and crafted for export from Roman Egypt by local craftsman, utilizing lathes, hollow drills, and surface polishing.

In 1721, the urn was excavated from the Domus Transitoria grounds, in a spot designated "Augustus' Bath", presently known as the palace's nymphaeum and garden. It was approximately around 1736-1738 that William Ponsonby, 2nd Earl of Bessborough, who was visiting Rome as part of a Grand Tour, acquired the piece, with the intent on using it as garden decoration at Parkstead House.

After Bessborough's death in 1793, his son sold the urn through Christie's in their 1801 Antiquities Auction. The auction garnered much attention with participants including John Soane, Thomas Hope, and Charles Townley. Ultimately, the Frederick Howard, 5th Earl of Carlisle purchased the vase for 110 guineas.

For over 214 years onwards, the urn resided in Castle Howard in North Yorkshire, and was highly valued by its owner as it was catalogued as No.1 in Castle Howard's inventory Bronzes, statuary & table tops. 5th Earl of Carlisle (Castle Howard Archive H2/2/2).It also saw documentation and study by art historian Gustav Friedrich Waagen during the mid-19th century, who recorded a pair of vases, 2 1/2 feet high one of "oriental alabaster, and another of granite". It was later sold by the estate to a New York private collection through Sotheby's on 8 July 2015. On March 2026, the vase was once again sold and put on display at TEFAF Maastricht under the gallery Stuart Lochhead Sculpture, to which the Yale University Art Gallery purchased from and subsequent announced its public display on July 2026.

== Description ==
Measuring 68.5 x 52 x 46 cm, Nero's Urn is carved from single black granite extracted from Southern Aswan, and was carved by a workshop based in Alexandria. Its find site in the Nymphaeum of the Domus Transitoria meant it was intended to be part of an elaborate set up of frescos, marbles, sculptures and water features.

Largely intact, there are chips and abrasions on the foot and rim of the urn. The handles on one part of the neck, and the area between the handles and neck were left unpolished. At the foot of the vase, a 3/4 inch diameter hole was filled with debris, though the intention of the hole was to secure the urn to a pedestal. The bottom two-thirds of the vase's interior is polished, with the top crudely polished up to the inside of its neck. There used to be a lid for it, but it has been lost ever since.
