= Yoshimi Futamura =

Japanese ceramic artist (born 1959)

Yoshimi Futamura is a Japanese ceramic artist who has worked and lived in France since 1986 . She was born in 1959, in Nagoya, Aichi Prefecture.

== Biography and Accomplishments ==
She studied in Japan at the School of Ceramic Art in Seto, Aichi from 1979 to 1982, and is a graduate of the Centre Artisanal de Ceramic de L’Ecole Duperre in Paris. Her work resides with the collection of the Harn Museum of Art, the AIC Ariana Museum in Geneva, the Yale University Art Gallery, and The Brooklyn Museum. She was one of five leading female ceramic artists featured in a show at Joan Mirviss Gallery in NYC, entitled, "The French Connection: Five Japanese Women Ceramicists and a Passion for France”.

== Gender in Japanese Ceramics ==
Within the global art market, Futamura's work references both modern and classical themes in Japanese ceramics. Her use of naturally occurring, organic textures are combined with traditional shapes, creating unique works of art. Her role within Japanese ceramics is also nontraditional, as women are excluded from the apprentice system of ceramic production. As a result, Futamura's work is both sculptural and functional, but emphasizes self-expression as a fundamental part of her artistic practice. The shift in gender roles occurred post-World War II, marking the development of independent female artists. As secondary education became more open to a wider audience, women were able to study ceramics through universities, rather than entering the apprenticeship system. While Futamura's work in France may be read as indicating the importance of globalization within contemporary artistic practice, it is also important to indicate that her training occurred within a country with a long running history of ceramic arts produced by both men and women.

== Work and Ethos ==
Futamura's work is often inspired by nature, but reflects the natural kiln effects. The texture of her work may appear burned, crushed, creased, charred, or speckled with fine granules. Her materials, from porcelain to terracotta are used to create forms that often appear biomorphic, irregular and almost sexual. In an interview, she mentioned that her work showcases the materiality of her medium, earth. Futamura's artwork can be read within the concept of wabi sabi, or imperfect, incomplete beauty. The irregularity of her pieces only increases their meditative quality.

== Public Collections ==
Futamura's work is held in the permanent collections of public institutions across Europe, North America, and Asia. Notable collections include:

Institution	City	Country
Brooklyn Museum	New York City	United States
Yale University Art Gallery	New Haven	United States
Minneapolis Institute of Art	Minneapolis	United States
University of Michigan Museum of Art	Ann Arbor	United States
Musée Cernuschi	Paris	France
Museum Boijmans Van Beuningen	Rotterdam	Netherlands
