= Great Fire of Rome =

Conflagration in Ancient Rome (AD 64)

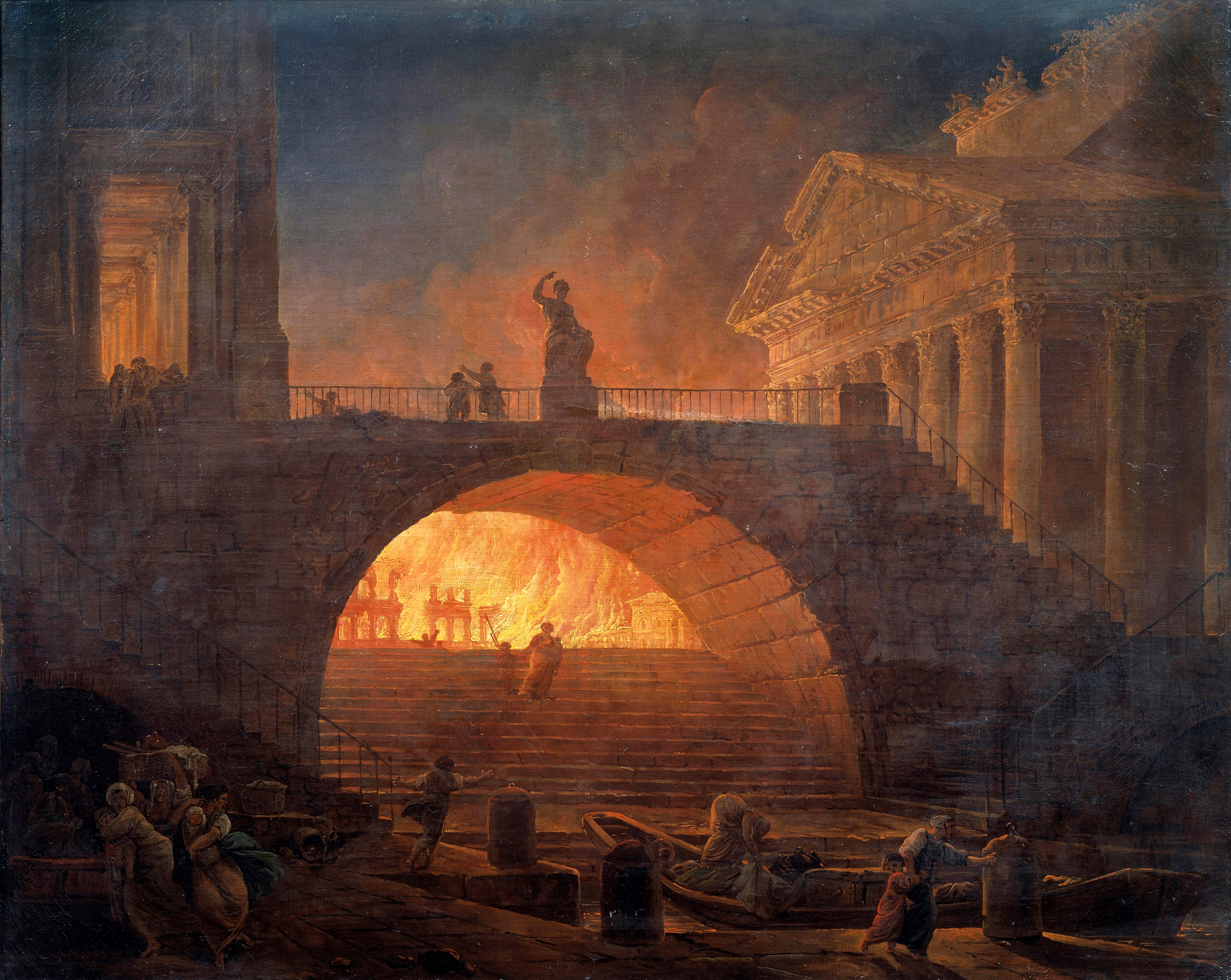
Fire in Rome by Hubert Robert (1785)

The Great Fire of Rome (Latin: incendium magnum Romae) began on the evening of 18–19 July 64 AD. The fire started in the merchant shops around Rome's chariot stadium, Circus Maximus. After six days, the fire was brought under control, but before the damage could be assessed, the fire reignited and burned for another three days. In the aftermath of the fire, nearly three quarters of Rome had been destroyed (10 out of 14 districts).

According to Tacitus, Emperor Nero blamed the devastation on the Christian community in the city, initiating the empire's first persecution against the Christians. Other contemporary historians blamed Nero's incompetence but it is commonly agreed by historians nowadays that Rome was too densely populated and inadequately prepared to effectively deal with large-scale disasters, including fires, and that such an event was inevitable.

== Background ==
=== Previous recorded fires in Rome ===
Fires in Rome were common, especially in houses, and fires that had occurred previously in Rome and destroyed parts of major buildings include:

- AD 6, which led to the introduction of the Cohortes Vigiles
- AD 12 which destroyed the Basilica Julia
- AD 14 at the Basilica Aemilia
- AD 22 at the Campus Martius
- AD 26 at Caelian Hill
- AD 36 at the Circus Maximus

=== Nero ===
Nero was proclaimed Roman emperor in AD 54 at the age of 17. His rule has commonly been associated with impulsiveness and tyranny but was, for the most part, liked by the general populace and disliked merely by the aristocracy. For his popularity among the common people, Anthony A. Barrett calls him "Rome's Golden Boy." Early in his reign, Nero was heavily advised, but he slowly became more independent. In AD 59, encouraged by his mistress Poppaea, Nero murdered his mother Agrippina. His leading adviser, Seneca, was discharged and forced to commit suicide.

After the Great Fire of Rome occurred in July AD 64, it was rumored that Nero had ordered the fire to clear space for a new palace, the Domus Aurea. At the time of the fire Nero may not have been in Rome but 35 miles away at his villa in Antium, and possibly returned to the city before the fire was out.

=== Tacitus ===
Publius Cornelius Tacitus was a senator and historian of the Roman Empire. His exact birth date is unknown, but most sources place it in either AD 56 or 57. His two main works, the Annals and the Histories, covered the history of the empire between AD 14 and AD 96. However, much of the work has been lost, including the books covering events after AD 70. Tacitus was only eight years old at the time of the fire, but he was able to use public records and reports to write the most detailed and reliable account available to modern historians. Yet, his record of the fire, while accurate compared to Suetonius or Cassius Dio, still contains undertones of political bias as he heavily pushes rumors of Nero's guilt without directly accusing him of arson.

=== Vigiles ===
In 22 BC, Augustus funded a fire brigade. In AD 6, he introduced the Vigiles ("cohorts of the watchmen"). The cohortes vigilum, run by freedmen, were tasked with guarding Rome at night. The cohortes urbanae were tasked with guarding Rome during the day. By the time of the Great Fire of Rome, there were thousands of Vigiles in the city, and they went to work trying to stop the flames by pouring buckets of water into buildings, trying to move flammable material from the fire's path, and even demolishing buildings to attempt to make a fire break.

=== Rome's water system ===
Before the fire, Rome's water was brought in by nine aqueducts, which were not set up with equipment to fight fires. Carrying out repairs to the aqueducts was an ongoing task for the Curator Aquarum or Water Commissioner of Rome. The Curator Aquarum was also in charge of investigations into those who were illegally piping water away without paying a license fee to the state. Firefighters relied on blankets, buckets of water, vinegar, and demolition of buildings to put fires out.

== Outbreak and progress of fire ==
According to Tacitus, the fire began in shops where flammable goods were stored, in the region of the Circus neighboring the Caelian and Palatine Hills of Rome. The night brought strong winds and the flames rapidly spread along the full length of the Circus. The fire expanded through an area of narrow, twisting streets and closely located apartment blocks. In this lower area of ancient Rome, there were no large buildings such as temples, or open areas of ground, to impede the conflagration. It then spread along the Palatine and Caelian slopes.

The population fled first to areas unaffected by the fire and then to the open fields and rural roads outside the city. Tacitus alleged that looters and arsonists had spread the flames by throwing torches or, acting in groups, hindering measures to halt or slow the fire's spread. These groups purportedly admitted they were ordered to do so. The fire stopped after six days of continuous burning. It then reignited and burned for another three days.

Tests into how fires spread have shown that large fires are able to create their own wind and this, combined with embers being blown to new buildings, could have caused the fire to spread further and could account for witnesses claiming that random fires started in houses that were away from the flames. As well as wind playing a factor in fire spread, those who had claimed to be under orders to stop people from fighting the fires never named the one who ordered them and they were also reported to have looted buildings.

== Aftermath ==
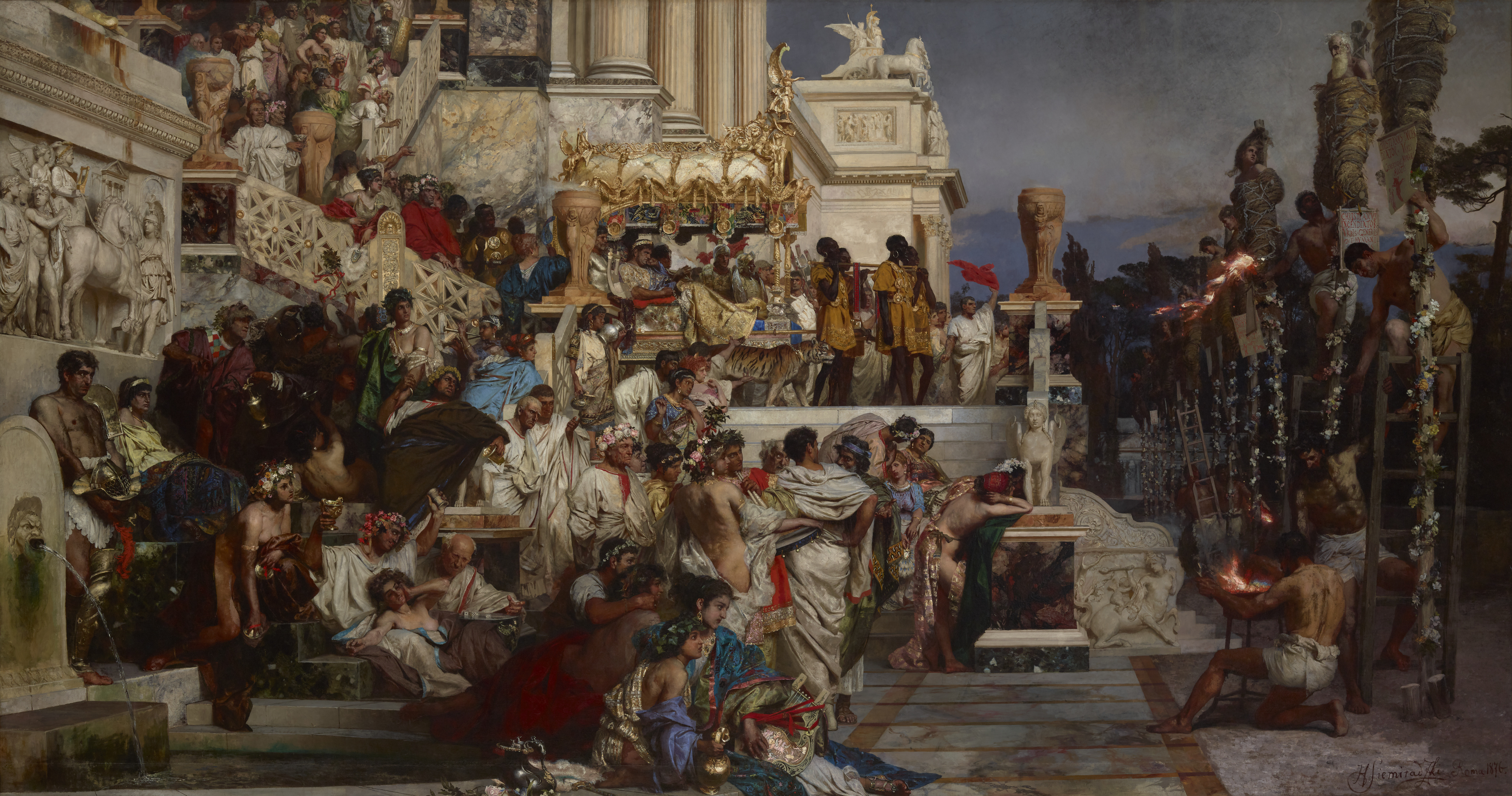
Nero's Torches by Henryk Siemiradzki. According to Tacitus, Nero targeted Christians as those responsible for the fire.

According to Tacitus, Nero was away from Rome, in Antium, when the fire broke out. Nero returned to the city and took measures to bring in food supplies and to open gardens and public buildings to accommodate refugees. Of Rome's fourteen districts, three were completely devastated, seven more were reduced to a few scorched and mangled ruins and only four completely escaped damage. The Temple of Jupiter Stator, the House of the Vestals, and Nero's palace, the Domus Transitoria, were damaged or destroyed.

Also destroyed in the fire was the portion of the Forum where the Roman senators lived and worked. The open space in the middle of the Forum remained a shopping/meeting centre. The accusations of Nero having started the fire were further exacerbated by his quickness to rebuild burned neighbourhoods in the Greek style and to launch construction of his new palace.

For the city's reconstruction, Nero dictated new and far-sighted building rules, intended to prevent greedy property developers from taking advantage of the destroyed land and trace a new urban plan, which still can be discerned from the city layout today. He rebuilt much of the destroyed area and had the ostentatious building complex known as Domus Aurea (Golden House) built, his personal residence, replacing the Domus Transitoria and including an extension of about 2.5 km^{2}, which came to include the Palatine, the slopes of the Esquiline (Oppian) and part of the Caelian. This may not have been a possible motive for the fire, as he could have requisitioned the necessary land anyway, and most was already in his possession.

To find the necessary funds for the reconstruction, Nero's government increased taxation. In particular, heavy tributes were imposed on the provinces of the empire. To meet at least a proportion of the costs, Nero devalued the Roman currency by reducing the weight of the gold aureus and lowering the silver content of the denarius, which was driven by the financial strain of his post-fire building projects.

Debris from the fire was used as in-fill for the nearby malaria-infested marshes.

Christians, blamed by Nero for the fire, were identified, arrested, and killed. Some, for the entertainment of spectators, were torn to pieces by hunting dogs, while others were crucified in ways calculated to make them look ridiculous. According to Jerome, the total number of Christians killed by Nero was 979.

== Varying historical accounts ==
The varying historical accounts of the event come from three secondary sources—Cassius Dio, Suetonius, and Tacitus. The primary accounts, which possibly included histories written by Fabius Rusticus, Marcus Cluvius Rufus, and Pliny the Elder, do not survive. At least six separate stories circulate regarding Nero and the fire:

- Motivated by a desire to destroy the city, Nero secretly sent out men pretending to be drunk to set fire to the city. Nero watched from his palace on the Palatine Hill, singing and playing the lyre, hence the expression "to fiddle while Rome burns".
- Nero openly sent out men to set fire to the city. Nero watched from the Tower of Maecenas on the Esquiline Hill while singing.
- Nero sent out men to set fire to the city. There were unconfirmed rumors that Nero sang from a private stage during the fire.
- Nero was motivated to destroy the city so he would be able to bypass the senate and rebuild Rome in his image.
- Rumor had it that Nero had started the fire. Therefore, to blame someone else for it (and thus exonerate Nero from blame), the fire was said to have been caused by the already unpopular Christians. However, record of the post-fire Christian persecution has notably been documented by Tacitus (and in the fifth century, Sulpicius Severus, who openly relied on Tacitus as a source) only. Later Christian authors, such as Jerome, Tertullian, Lactantius, and Eusebius all identified Nero as the first persecutor of Christians, yet none of them connected the persecutions to the fire. Barrett calls this silence "remarkable." Since then, this has been a subject of historiographical debate. According to Barrett, historians have considered whether Tacitus had confused two separate events, added the persecution later, or if he had distorted or even invented the event. Nevertheless, record of the post-fire persecution shows common Roman attitudes toward the Christian minority at the time.
- The fire was an accident that occurred while Nero was in Antium.

== See also ==
- List of fires
- List of town and city fires

== Bibliography ==
- Cassius Dio, Roman History Books 62 (c. 229)
- Suetonius, The Lives of Twelve Caesars, the Life of Nero, 38 (c. 121)
- Tacitus, Annals, XV (c. 117)
