= Yale University Art Gallery =

Museum in New Haven, Connecticut

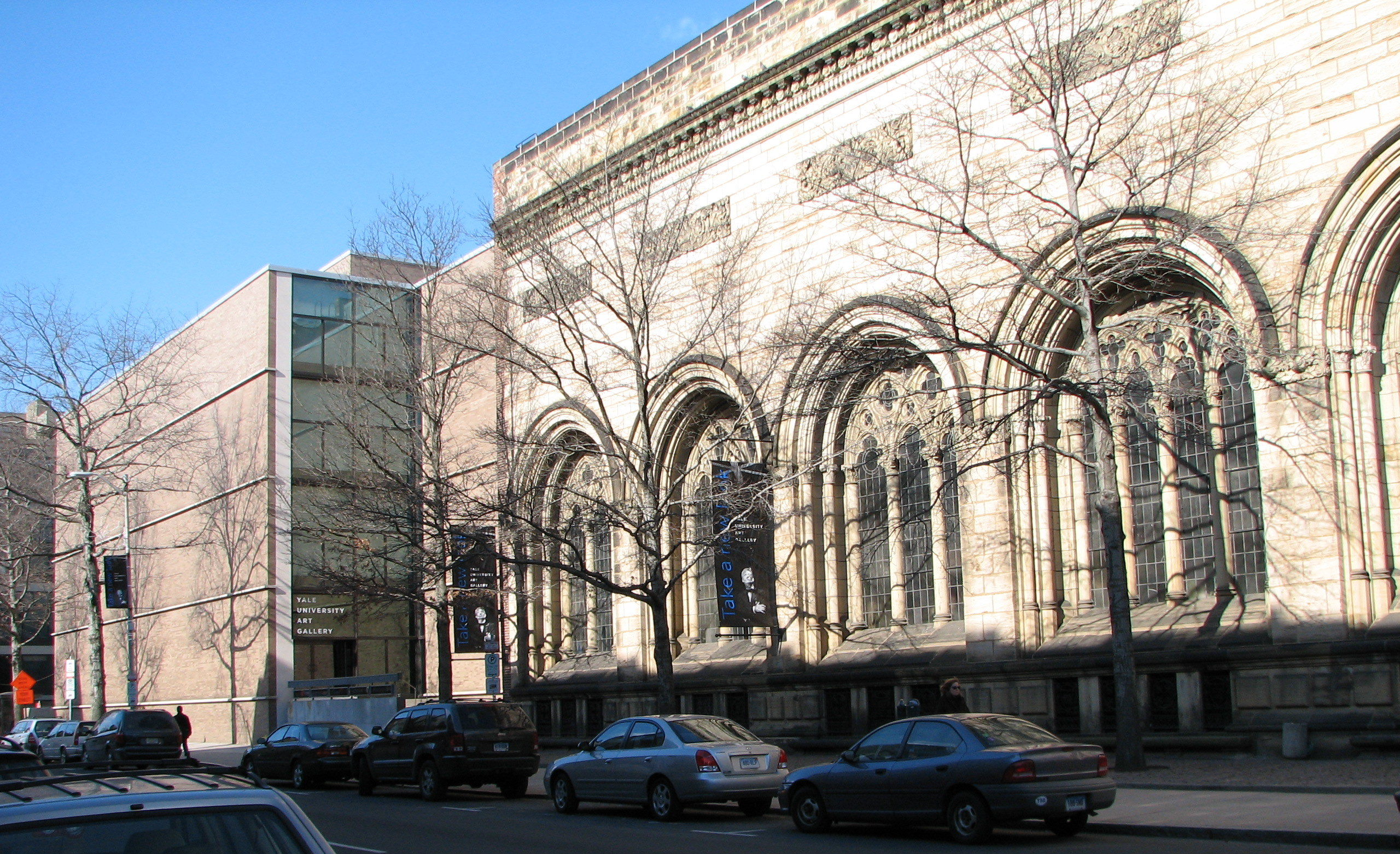
- Yale University Art Gallery's Louis Kahn Building (left) is connected to the Old Yale Art Gallery (right)
- Established: 1832
- Location: 1111 Chapel Street, New Haven, Connecticut, US
- Coordinates: 41.308459°N 72.930985°W
- Type: Art museum
- Director: Stephanie Wiles since 2018
- Public transit access: 237, 238, 241, 243, 246, 254, 255
- Website: artgallery.yale.edu

The Yale University Art Gallery (YUAG) is an art museum in New Haven, Connecticut. It houses a major encyclopedic collection of art in several interconnected buildings on the campus of Yale University. Although it embraces all cultures and periods, the gallery emphasizes early Italian Renaissance painting, African sculpture, and modern art. It is the oldest university art museum in the Western Hemisphere.

== History ==
=== 19th century ===
The gallery was founded in 1832 when patriot artist John Trumbull donated over 100 paintings of the American Revolution to Yale College and designed the original picture gallery. This gallery housed a collection of paintings by John Trumbull, including Battle of Bunker Hill, Death of Montgomery before Quebec, Surrender of Lord Cornwallis, and Declaration of Independence. This building on the university's Old Campus was razed in 1901.

Street Hall, designed by Peter Bonnett Wight, was opened as the Yale School of the Fine Arts in 1866, and included exhibition galleries on the second floor. The exterior was in a neo-Gothic style, with an appearance influenced by 13th-century Venetian palaces. These spaces are the oldest ones still in use as part of the Yale University Art Gallery.

=== 20th century ===
A new building, designed by Yale University architect Egerton Swartwout, was completed in 1928. This building features a deliberately eclectic mix of Romanesque, Gothic and Classical features, with cornices, a pitched slate roof, and large windows set within stone arches, and was connected to Street Hall by an enclosed bridge over High Street. It was ultimately known as the "Old Yale Art Gallery" to contrast it with the modernist expansion added a couple of decades later.

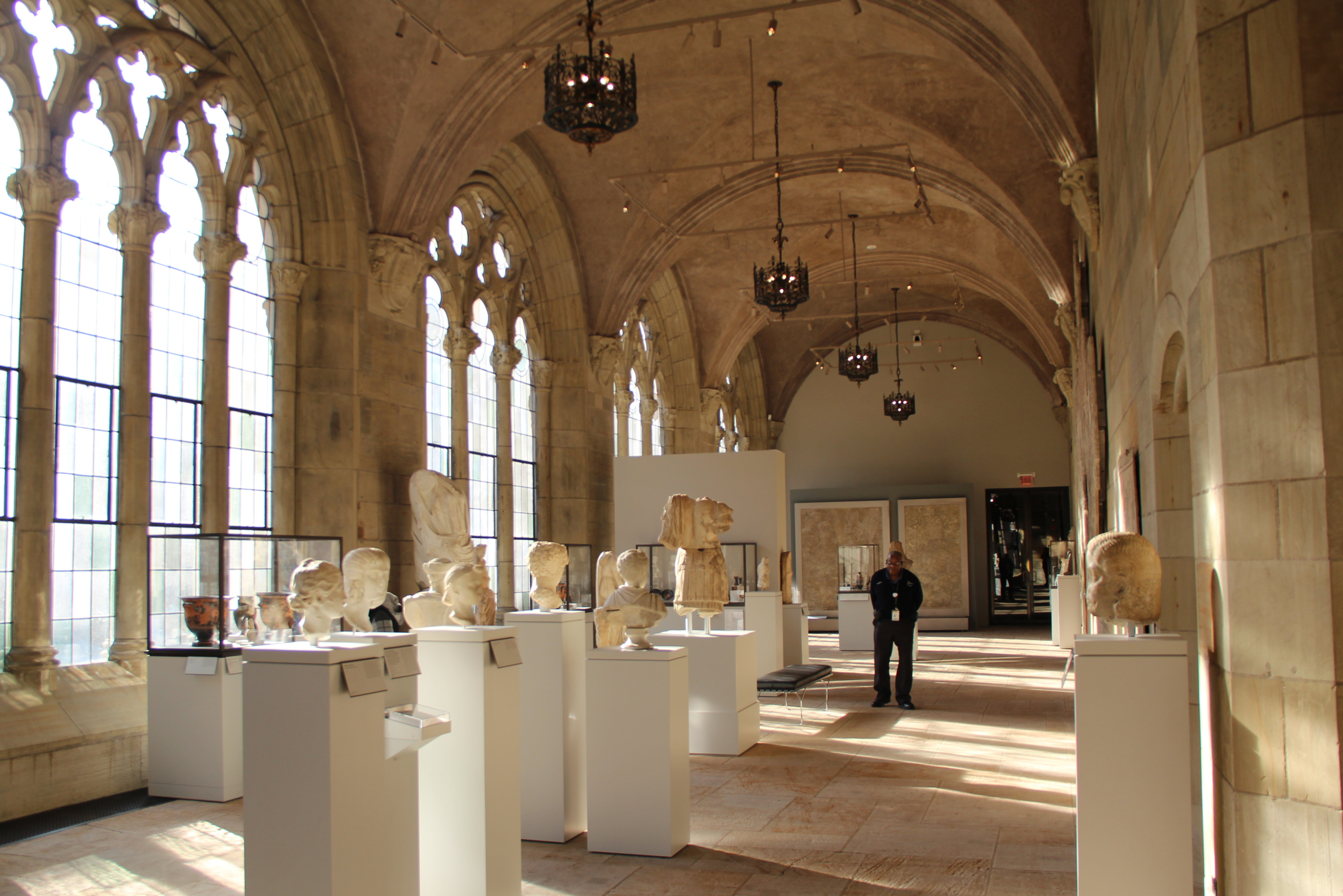
Ancient Greek and Roman art in the Sculpture Hall in the Old Yale Art Gallery.

The gallery's modernist main building, built from 1947 to 1953, was among the first designed by Louis Kahn, who taught architecture at Yale("Kahn played a major role in Yale's own artistic development. And Yale in turn would give Kahn the commission that transformed his career as an architect.") Philip L. Goodwin was the original architect for the building, but he had to drop out due to health reasons and the project was then given to Kahn.

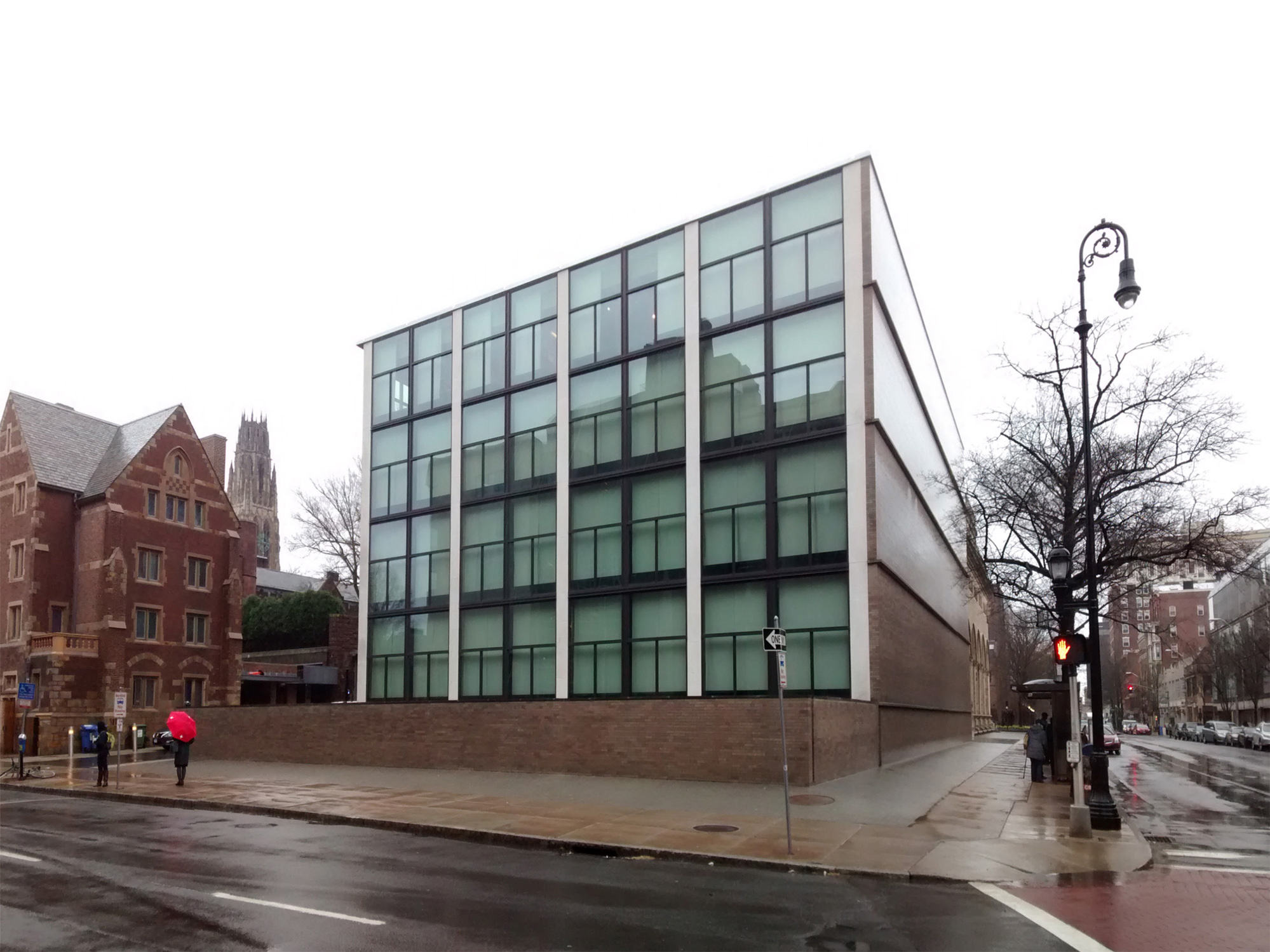
View of the Louis Kahn-designed galleries

Although the Art Gallery with steel structure and reinforced concrete may seem simple to the eye, it was designed in a rigorous process. Kahn and Anne Tyng, the first woman licensed as an architect in the state of Pennsylvania and an employee of Kahn's independent practice, "devised a slab that was to be poured into metal forms in the shape of three-sided pyramids. When the forms were removed, they left a thick mass of concrete imprinted with tetrahedral openings." The triangular ceiling of the gallery was designed by Tyng, who was fascinated by geometry and octet-truss construction.

Kahn's addition "was...a box...of glass, steel, concrete, and tiny beige bricks", and had none of the features of the earlier galleries. One critic said that Kahn's building "could have scarcely have been distinguished from a Woolco discount store in a shopping center", and that the interior looked like an "underground parking garage".

In 1998, the gallery began a major renovation and expansion. A renovation of the 1953 building was completed in December 2006 by Polshek Partnership Architects, who returned many spaces to Kahn's original vision.

=== 21st century ===
The project was completed on December 12, 2012, at a cost of $135 million, under then-director Jock Reynolds. The expanded space totals 69,975 sq ft (6,500.9 m^{2}).

In December 2011, the museum announced an $11 million gift from alumnus Stephen Susman, to create additional art exhibition galleries in a newly created fourth floor atop the Old Yale Art Gallery building. The expansion was completed in 2012, and included space for a rooftop sculpture garden.

== Gallery ==
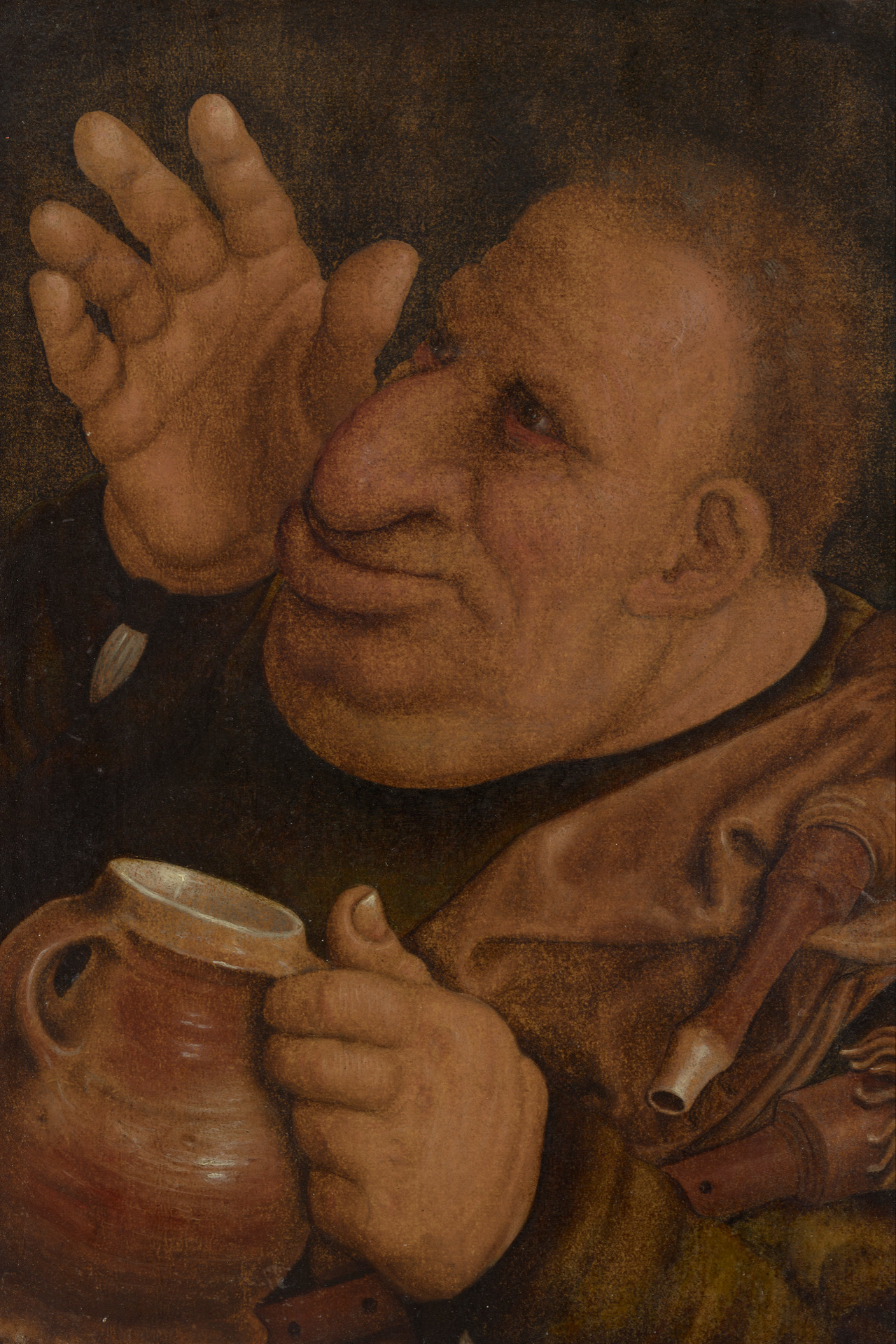
A bagpiper, an early 16th century portrait by Quentin Massys

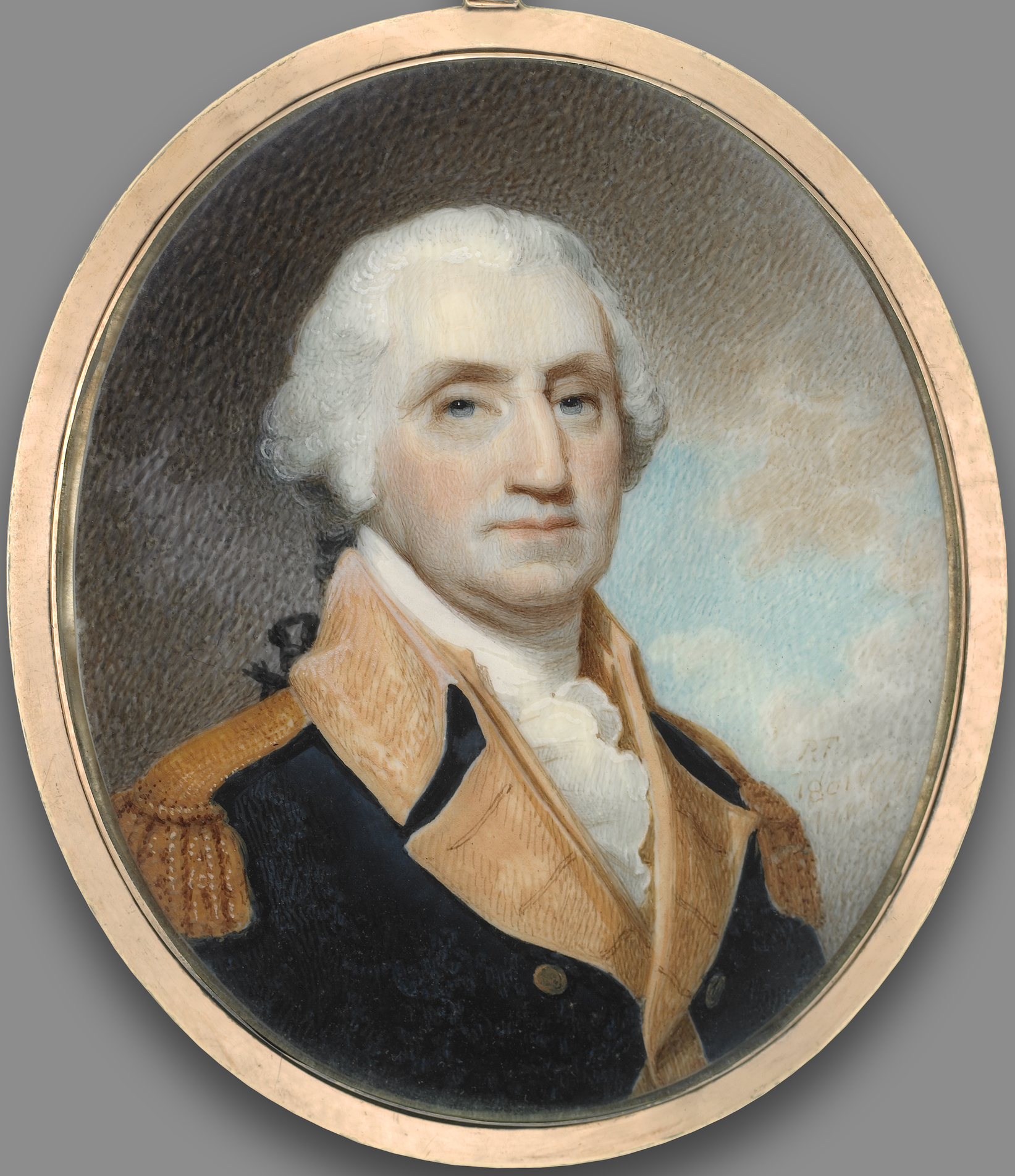
Miniature of George Washington, an 1800 miniature portrait of George Washington by Robert Field

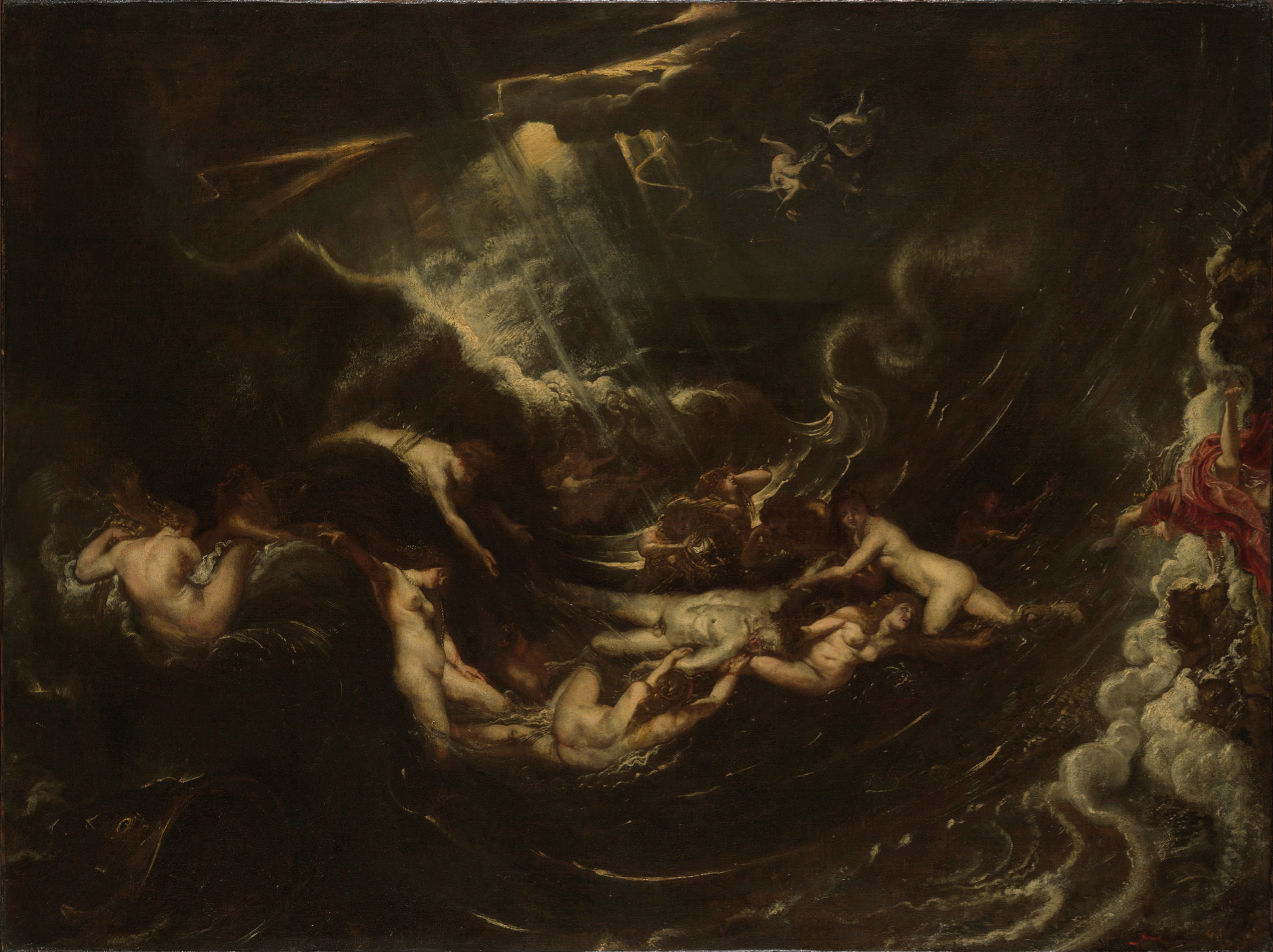
Hero and Leander, a portrait by Peter Paul Rubens

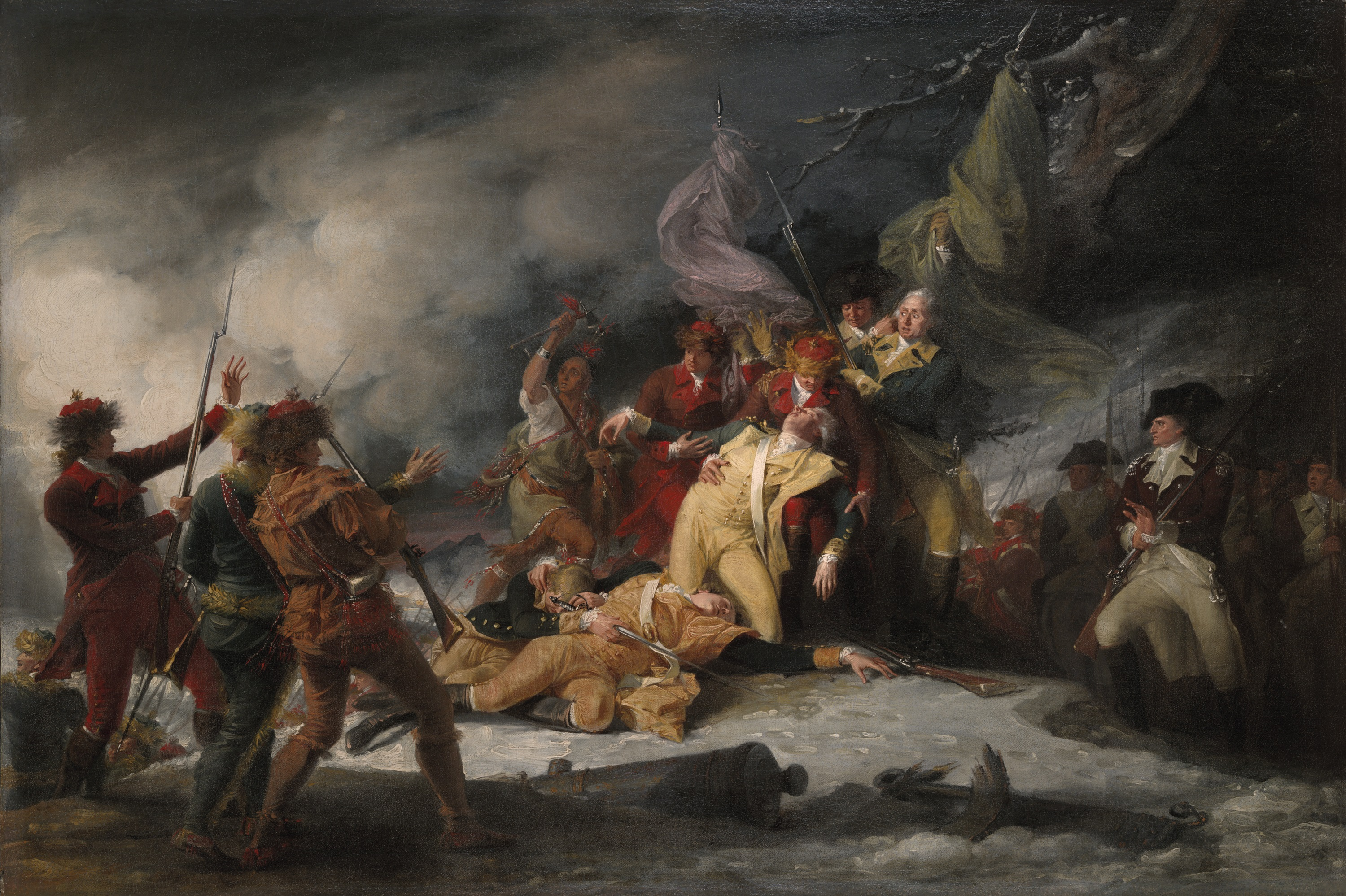
The Death of General Montgomery in the Attack on Quebec, December 31, 1775, a 1786 portrait by John Trumbull

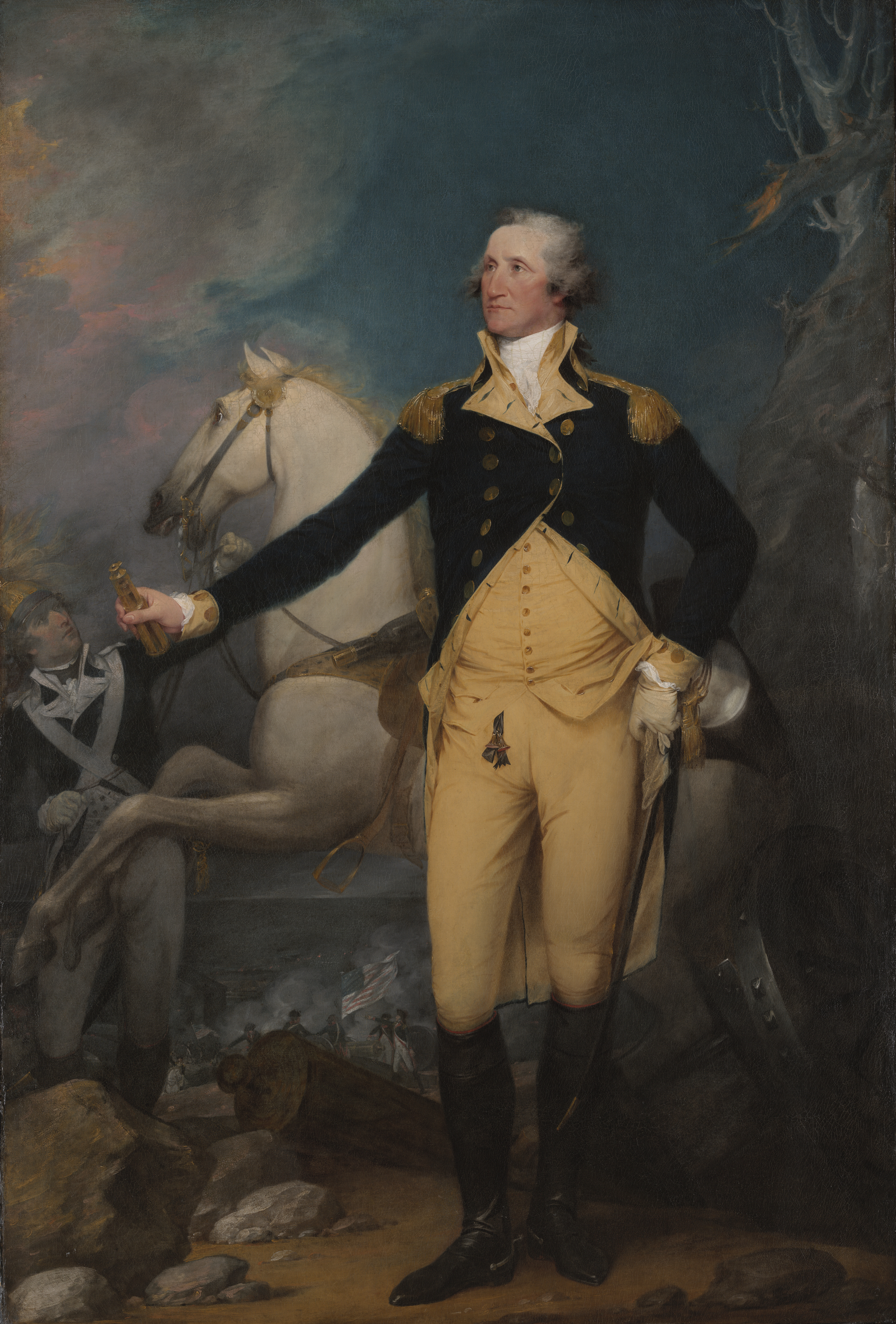
General George Washington at Trenton, John Trumbull, 1792

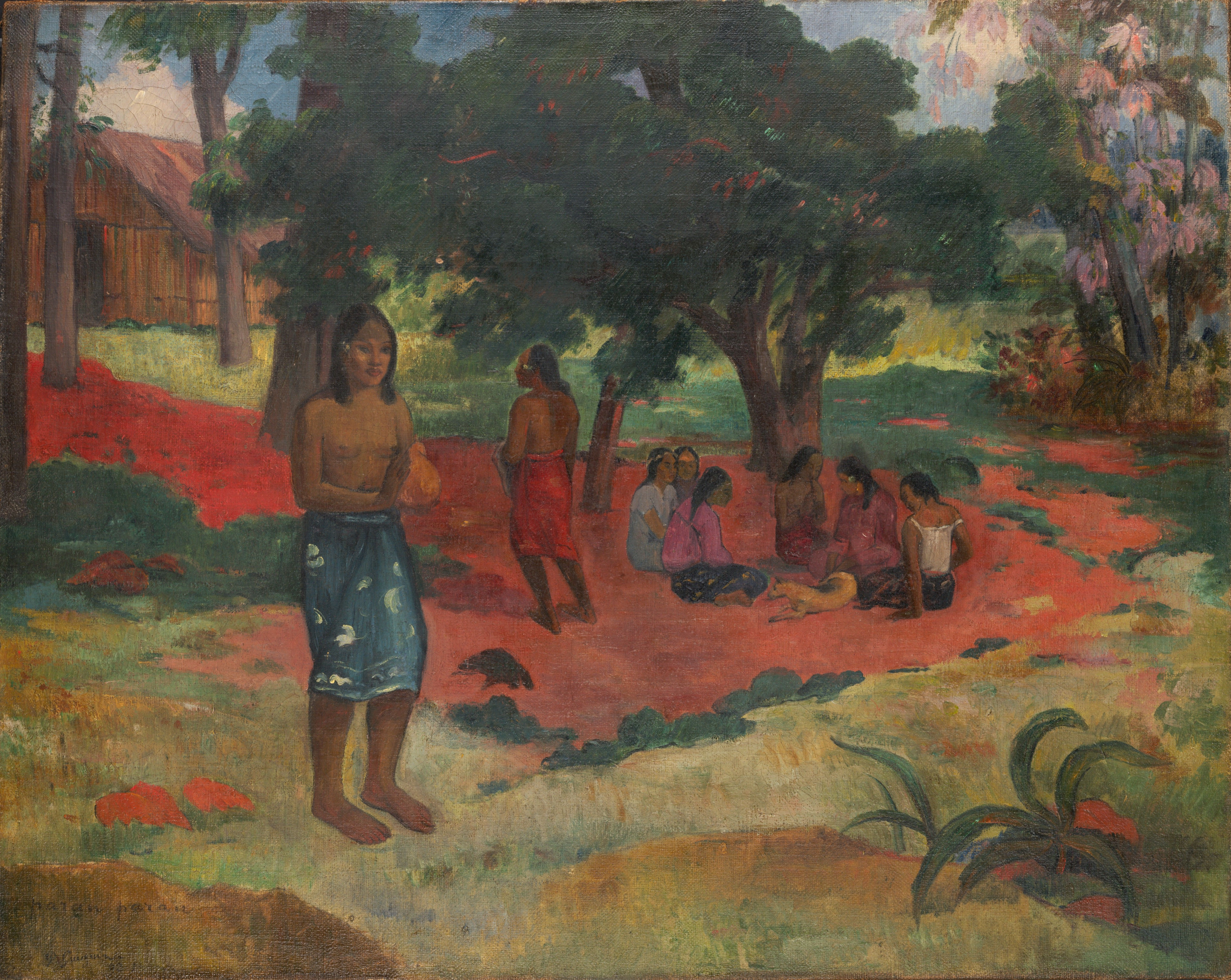
Parau Parau (Whispered Words), an 1892 portrait by Paul Gauguin

The Night Café, an 1888 portrait by Vincent van Gogh

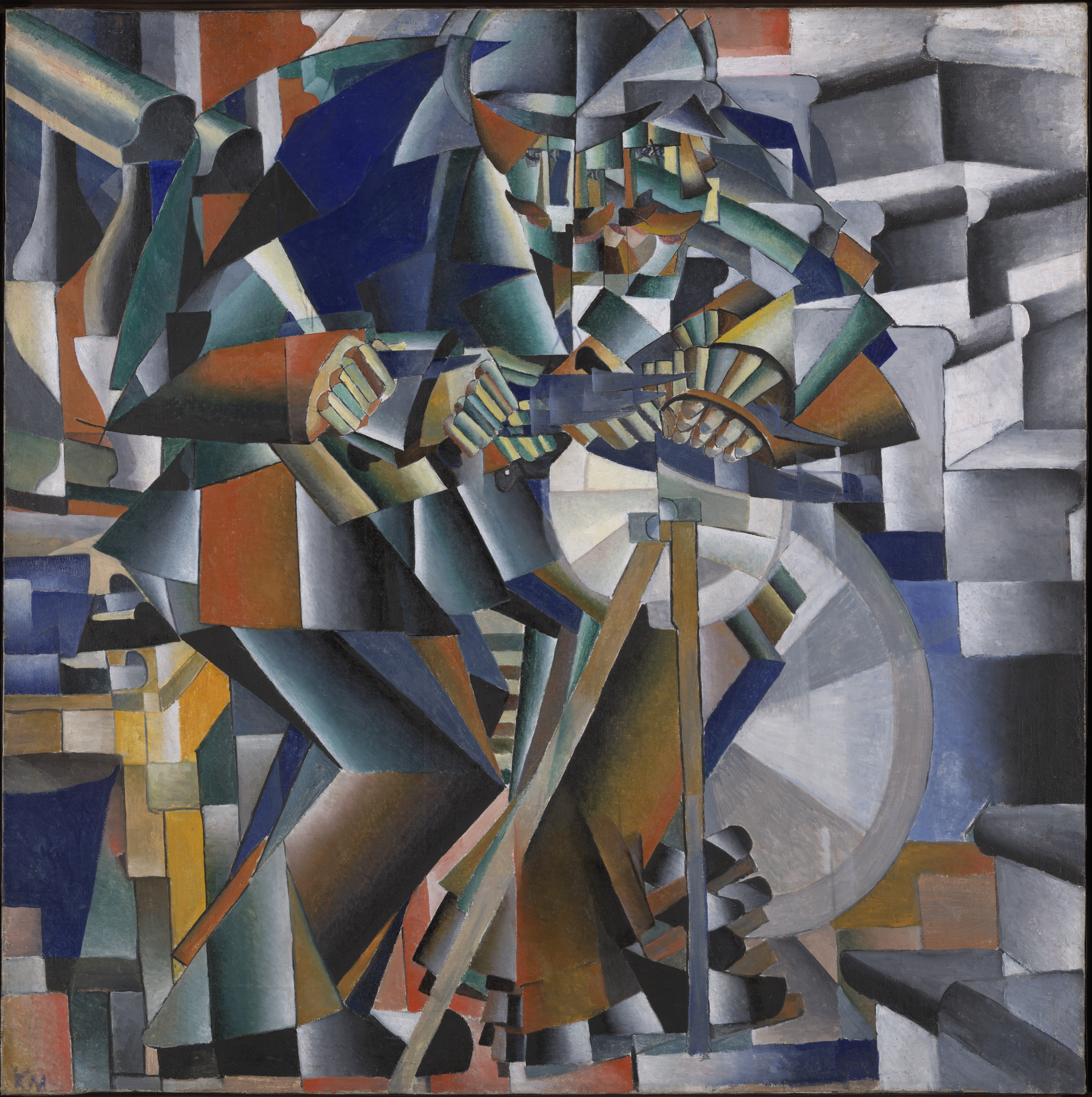
The Knifegrinder, a 1913 portrait by Kazimir Malevich

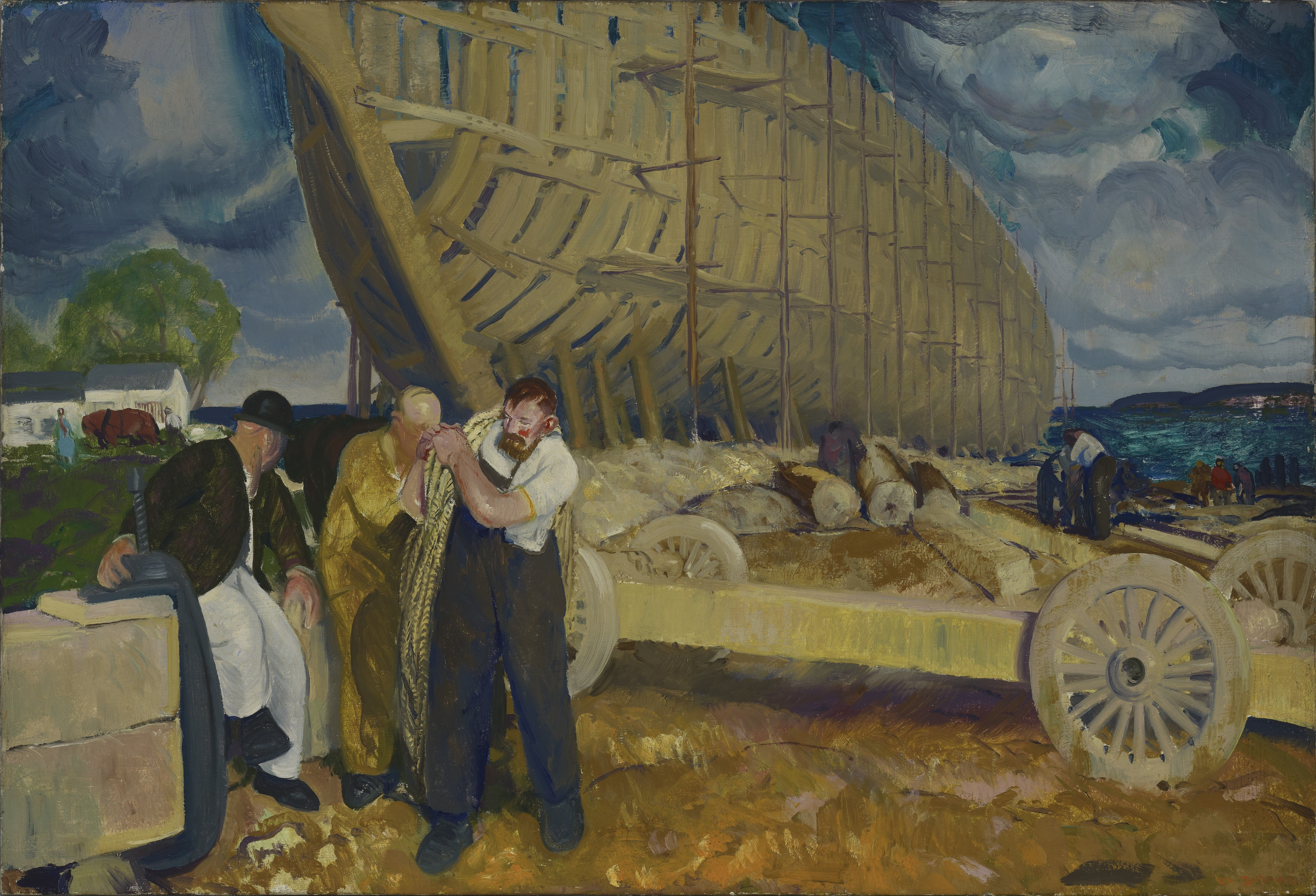
Builders of Ships, a 1916 portrait by George Bellows

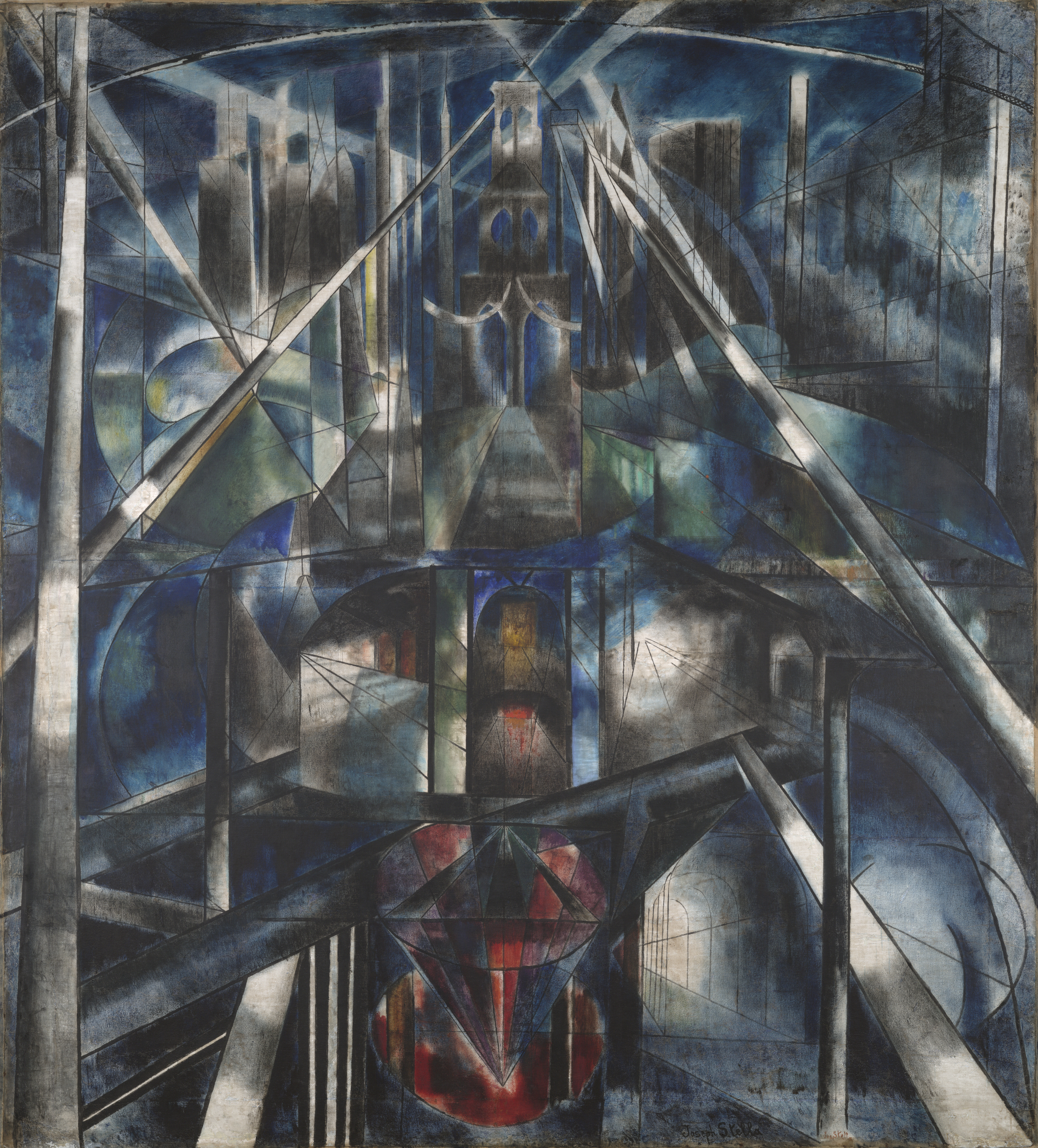
Brooklyn Bridge, a 1920 portrait of the Brooklyn Bridge by Joseph Stella

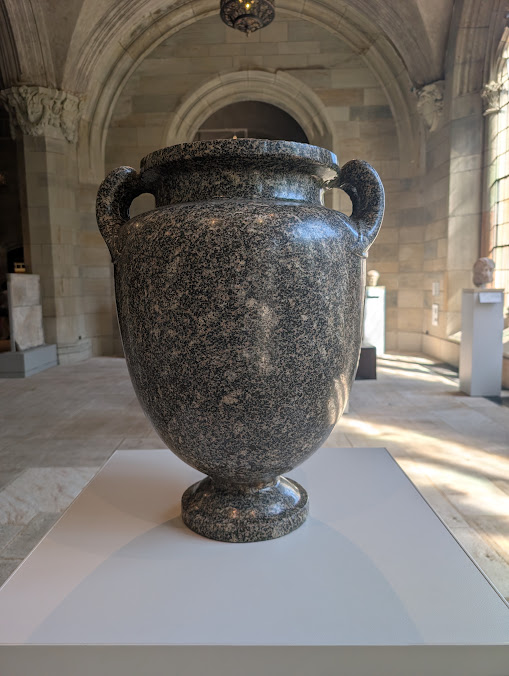
Nero's Urn (60-64 AD)

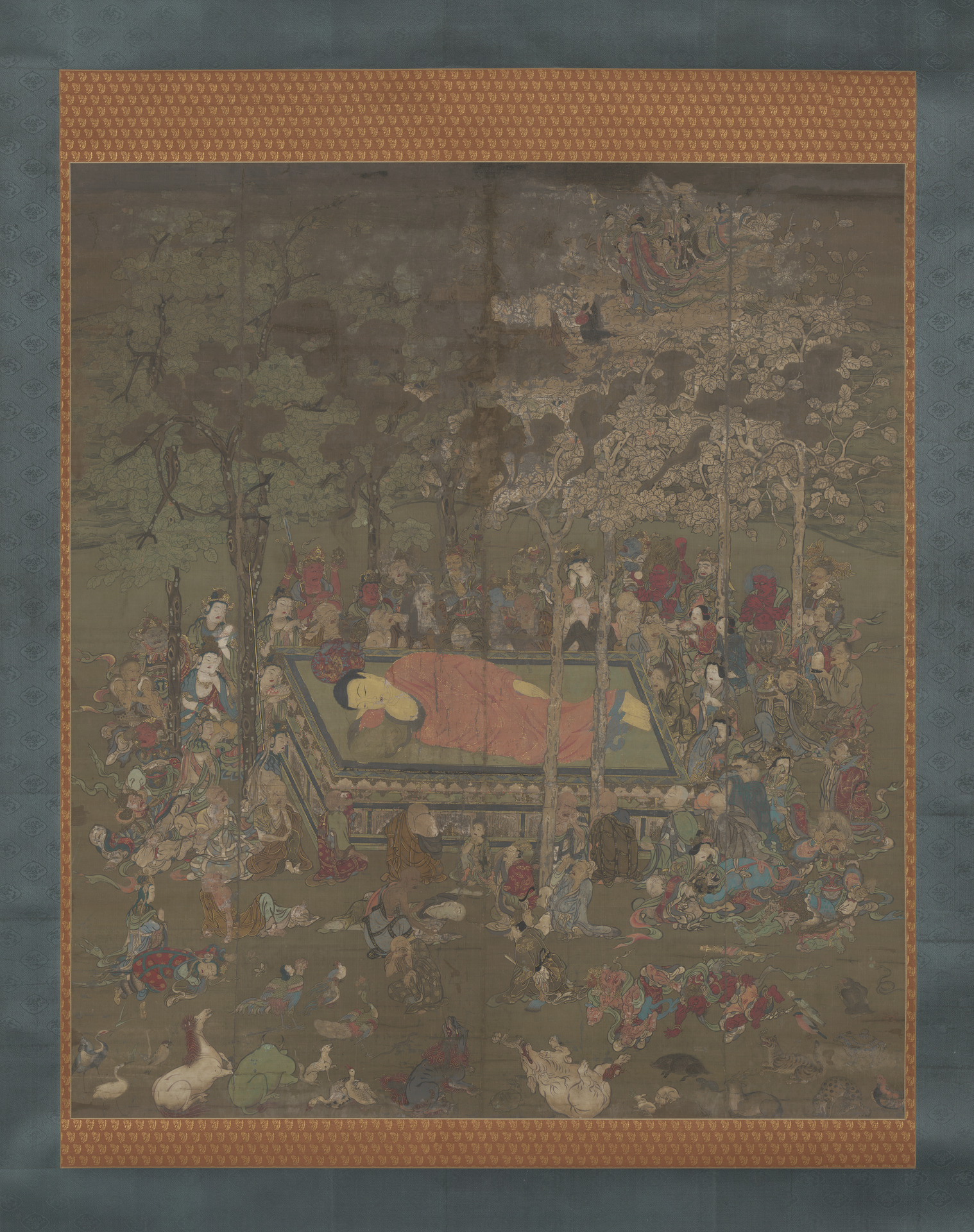
The Final Death of the Buddha Sakyamuni, by Myoson (Kamakura period)

A lion relief from the processional way, Babylon, Iraq.	A mosaic from Gerasa, Jordan.	A mithraeum from Dura-Europos, Syria.
Cassone clothing chest painted by Paolo Uccello.	A gallery with "Society Woman's Cloth (Gold)" by El Anatsui, left.	"Portrait of a Hanseatic Merchant" by Hans Holbein the Younger.

== Collection ==
The encyclopedic collections of the gallery number more than 300,000 objects ranging in date from ancient times to the present day. The permanent collection includes:

- African Art: more than 1,000 objects in wood, metal, ivory, and ceramic
- American Decorative Arts: approximately 18,000 objects in silver, glass, wood, porcelain, and textile with an emphasis on the colonial and early federal periods
- American Paintings and Sculpture: more than 2,500 paintings, 500 sculptures, and 300 miniatures from before the mid-twentieth century including paintings by Benjamin West, John Singleton Copley, Albert Bierstadt, Frederic Church, Frederic Remington, Thomas Eakins, Winslow Homer, George Bellows, John Singer Sargent, Edwin Austin Abbey, Arthur Dove, Elizabeth Goodridge, and Edward Hopper, and sculptures by Hezekiah Augur, Hiram Powers, Horatio Greenough, William Henry Rinehart, Chauncey Ives, Alexander Archipenko, and Alexander Calder
- Ancient Art: more than 13,000 objects from the Near East, Egypt, Greece, Etruria, and Rome dating from the Neolithic to the early Byzantine
- Art of the Ancient Americas: Mayan and Olmec figurines, vessels and sculptures
- Asian Art: more than 8,000 objects including sculpture, textiles, paintings, costume, ceramics, and calligraphy from China, Japan, Korea, Afghanistan and more. Featured works range from the ukiyo-e woodblock prints of Kitagawa Utamaro and Isoda Koryūsai to contemporary ceramics by artists including Tatsuzō Shimaoka and Yoshimi Futamura.
- Coins and Medals
- Early European Art
- Modern and Contemporary Art: including paintings and sculpture by Josef Albers, Edgar Degas, Marcel Duchamp, Alberto Giacometti, Jean Metzinger, Joan Miró, Piet Mondrian, Pablo Picasso, Mark Rothko, and Roy Lichtenstein
- Prints, Drawings, and Photographs

In 2005, the museum announced that it had acquired 1,465 gelatin silver prints by the influential American landscape photographer Robert Adams. In 2009, the museum mounted an exhibition of its extensive collection of Picasso paintings and drawings, in collaboration with the Nasher Museum of Art at Duke University. For the first time, portions of the Yale University Library's Gertrude Stein writing archives were displayed next to relevant drawings from Picasso.

In April 2022, the museum surrendered 13 South Asian artifacts, valued at more than $1 million, as part of art looting investigation.

== Programs ==
As an affiliate of Yale University, the gallery offers education programs for university students, New Haven schools, and the general public. Two such programs are: the Gallery Guide program, founded in 1998, which trains undergraduate students to lead tours at the museum; and the Wurtele Gallery Teachers, established in 2006, which include Yale graduate students from all school and backgrounds, who give curricula-informed tours to K-12 audiences.

The museum is a member of the North American Reciprocal Museums program, but charges no admission.

== Management ==
From 1946 to 1948, George Heard Hamilton was associate director at Yale University Art Gallery.

In July 2018, Stephanie Wiles became the Henry J. Heinz II Director of the Yale University Art Gallery.

== See also ==
- Yale Center for British Art
