= Friseria acaciella =

Scientific classification
- Domain: Eukaryota
- Kingdom: Animalia
- Phylum: Arthropoda
- Class: Insecta
- Order: Lepidoptera
- Family: Gelechiidae
- Genus: Friseria
- Species: F. acaciella

Binomial name
- Friseria acaciella (Busck, 1906)

Synonyms
- Telphusa acaciella Busck, 1906

Species of moth

Friseria acaciella is a moth of the family Gelechiidae. It is found in Mexico and the southern United States, where it has been recorded from Texas and Louisiana.

The wingspan is about 13 mm. The forewings are dark purple slightly lighter toward the apex and along the dorsal edge. There is a large oblique quadrangular yellowish white spot at the basal third, reaching with one corner down over the fold. A faint and ill-defined irregular transverse whitish line is found at the apical third between the darker basal and the lighter apical part of the wing. The hindwings are dark fuscous.

The larvae feed on Acacia farnesiana. The larva is whitish with black head.
