= Friseria nona =

Scientific classification
- Kingdom: Animalia
- Phylum: Arthropoda
- Clade: Pancrustacea
- Class: Insecta
- Order: Lepidoptera
- Family: Gelechiidae
- Genus: Friseria
- Species: F. nona

Binomial name
- Friseria nona Hodges, 1966

Species of moth

Friseria nona is a moth of the family Gelechiidae. It is found in North America, where it has been recorded from Arizona.

The wingspan is 10–13.5 mm. The coloration of the adults is similar to that of Friseria repentina, but the orange of repentina is generally replaced with buff.
