= Friseria infracta =

Scientific classification
- Domain: Eukaryota
- Kingdom: Animalia
- Phylum: Arthropoda
- Class: Insecta
- Order: Lepidoptera
- Family: Gelechiidae
- Genus: Friseria
- Species: F. infracta

Binomial name
- Friseria infracta (Walsingham, 1911)

Synonyms
- Gelechia infracta Walsingham, 1911

Species of moth

Friseria infracta is a moth of the family Gelechiidae. It is found in Mexico (Guerrero).

The wingspan is about 17 mm. The forewings are tawny fuscous, with a dark fuscous median shade running through them, from near the base to the apex, interrupted before the middle by a large white outwardly oblique costal patch which reaches to the fold expanding outward on the cell. This is clearly defined its origin being at one-fourth from the base. There is a faintly indicated spot of pale scales at the end of the cell and another above and beyond it on the costa and the dorsum is narrowly white from the base to the flexus. The hindwings are shining pale grey.
