= Farnese Gardens =

Gardens in Rome, Italy

Coordinates: 41°53′25″N 12°29′11″E

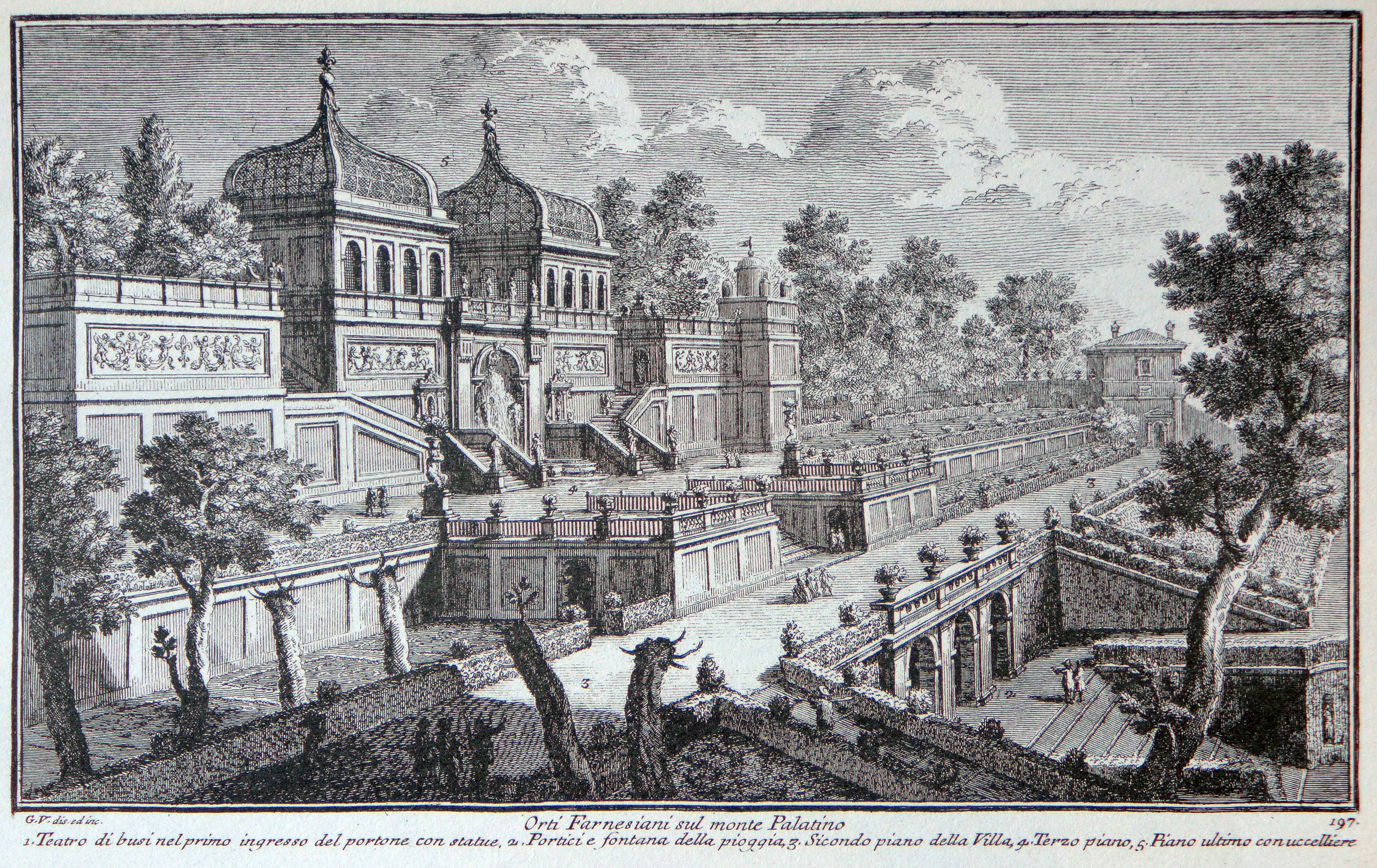
1761 engraving by architect Giuseppe Vasi from book 10 of his series of vedute (views) of Rome, showing the Farnese Gardens on the Palatine Hill in Rome at that time. The ground-floor entrance is at right, and the twin domes are above the aviaries on the third floor of the structure.

The Farnese Gardens (Italian: Orti Farnesiani sul Palatino), or "Gardens of Farnese upon the Palatine", are a garden in Rome, central Italy, created in 1550 on the northern portion of Palatine Hill, by Cardinal Alessandro Farnese. They were the first private botanical gardens in Europe; the first botanical gardens of any kind in Europe were started by Italian universities in the mid-16th century, only a short time before.

Alessandro Farnese was appointed Cardinal Deacon of the Roman Catholic Church in 1534 at the age of 14, by Paul III, his grandfather, who had been elected to the papacy two months previously. He is remembered for being an antiquarian who assembled the greatest collection of Roman sculpture assembled in private hands since antiquity, the famous Farnese Collection. In 1550, when Farnese acquired a northern portion of Palatine Hill (historically the oldest of Rome's seven hills) he had ruins from a Roman palace of Tiberius at the northwest end of the hill top filled in, and converted to a summer home. The site overlooks the Roman Forum and is near the Arch of Titus.

The garden was divided into the classic style of quadrants with a well or a fountain at its centre, deriving from the design of the Roman peristilium palaces of the area, as re-created by the noted architect Vignola. The villa's design was first attributed to Michelangelo but later to Vignola and Rainaldi. The gardens were arranged in terraces. Steps from terrace to terrace ran past the Ninfeo della Piogga (a nymphaeum) to end in the Teatro del Fontanone. Aviaries were situated in the center Casina, which boasted frescoes. Walking paths at the base of the Domus Tiberiana included underground passages and ancient sculptures.

Though little of the Farnese Gardens survives today, some remnant structures may be seen. The gardens became popular again in the 18th and 19th centuries as Grand Tour travelers visited Rome.

From the name of these gardens is derived the name of the plant Acacia farnesiana and from its floral essence, the important biochemical farnesol.

== See also ==
- Botanical garden
- List of botanical gardens
