= Friseria flammulella =

Scientific classification
- Domain: Eukaryota
- Kingdom: Animalia
- Phylum: Arthropoda
- Class: Insecta
- Order: Lepidoptera
- Family: Gelechiidae
- Genus: Friseria
- Species: F. flammulella

Binomial name
- Friseria flammulella (Walsingham, 1897)

Synonyms
- Gelechia flammulella Walsingham, 1897

Species of moth

Friseria flammulella is a moth of the family Gelechiidae. It is found on the U.S. Virgin Islands, where it has been recorded from Saint Thomas.

The wingspan is about 13.5 mm. The forewings are brownish ochreous along the costal half and tawny-brown along the dorsal half, without any dividing line, the two colours blending beyond the middle. There is a dark chocolate-brown shade from the costa at the base, which curves downwards and outwards, ending in a conspicuous dash along the lower edge of the cell before the middle, its upper edge narrowly margined with whitish throughout, a minute dot of the same dark colour at the lower angle of the cell. The whole wing is suffused with a rich vinous gloss. The hindwings are grey.
