= Friseria cockerelli =

Scientific classification
- Domain: Eukaryota
- Kingdom: Animalia
- Phylum: Arthropoda
- Class: Insecta
- Order: Lepidoptera
- Family: Gelechiidae
- Genus: Friseria
- Species: F. cockerelli

Binomial name
- Friseria cockerelli (Busck, 1903)

Synonyms
- Gelechia cockerelli Busck, 1903; Gelechia lindenella Busck, 1903; Gelechia malindella Busck, 1910; Gelechia sarcochlora Meyrick, 1929

Species of moth

Friseria cockerelli, the mesquite webworm moth, is a moth of the family Gelechiidae. It is found in Mexico and the southern United States, where it has been recorded in the states of Texas, New Mexico, Arizona, Colorado, California, Oklahoma and Nevada.

The wingspan is 15-16.5 mm. The forewings are light yellowish-brown, with dark blackish brown markings. It also has a large dark brown patch on the dorsal edge near the base. The costal base is of the general color of the wing and there is a blackish ill-defined costal spot at the apical third, which runs out in a dark shade across the wing. Just before this spot is another smaller, more sharply defined costal blackish spot.

Along the veins and in the disk are longitudinal dark lines, sharpest and darkest in the apical part of the wing, and each disappearing at the base of the cilia in a deep black spot. These longitudinal streaks are interrupted at the end of the cell by a short thin perpendicular deep black streak, followed by a short light brown space. The hindwings are yellowish fuscous. Adults are mostly on the wing from April to September.

The larvae feed on Prosopis species.

== Etymology ==
The species is named after the American zoologist Theodore Dru Alison Cockerell.
