= Friseria lacticaput =

Scientific classification
- Kingdom: Animalia
- Phylum: Arthropoda
- Clade: Pancrustacea
- Class: Insecta
- Order: Lepidoptera
- Family: Gelechiidae
- Genus: Friseria
- Species: F. lacticaput

Binomial name
- Friseria lacticaput (Walsingham, 1911)

Synonyms
- Gelechia lacticaput Walsingham, 1911

Species of moth

Friseria lacticaput is a moth of the family Gelechiidae. It is found in Mexico (Guerrero).

The wingspan is about 15 mm. The forewings are dark brown, with a very narrow snow-white basal patch extending across the wing, an oblique snow-white costal patch at one-fourth reaching to the fold and projecting outward on the cell, a minute white oblique costal streak at the commencement of the costal cilia, and a large snow-white semicircular tornal patch extending through the terminal cilia and sparsely sprinkled with brownish scales. The hindwings are pale purplish grey.
