= Friseria =

Scientific classification
- Domain: Eukaryota
- Kingdom: Animalia
- Phylum: Arthropoda
- Class: Insecta
- Order: Lepidoptera
- Family: Gelechiidae
- Tribe: Gelechiini
- Genus: Friseria; Busck, 1939

Genus of moths

Friseria is a genus of moths in the family Gelechiidae.

== Species ==
- Friseria acaciella (Busck, 1906)
- Friseria caieta Hodges, 1966
- Friseria cockerelli (Busck, 1903)
- Friseria flammulella (Walsingham, 1897)
- Friseria infracta (Walsingham, 1911)
- Friseria lacticaput (Walsingham, 1911)
- Friseria nona Hodges, 1966
- Friseria paphlactis (Meyrick, 1912)
- Friseria repentina (Walsingham, 1911)
