= Friseria caieta =

Scientific classification
- Kingdom: Animalia
- Phylum: Arthropoda
- Clade: Pancrustacea
- Class: Insecta
- Order: Lepidoptera
- Family: Gelechiidae
- Genus: Friseria
- Species: F. caieta

Binomial name
- Friseria caieta Hodges, 1966

Species of moth

Friseria caieta is a moth of the family Gelechiidae. It is found in North America, where it has been recorded from Arizona.

The wingspan is 12–14 mm. The forewings are white, dark brown, and orange brown, many brown scales with grey bases. The hindwings are fuscous.
