= Palatine Hill =

Centremost of the seven hills of Rome, Italy

Coordinates: 41°53′18″N 12°29′13″E

- One of the seven hills of Rome
- Latin name: Palatium; Collis Palatinus
- Italian name: Palatino
- Rione: Campitelli
- Buildings: Flavian Palace
- People: Cicero, Augustus, Tiberius, Domitian
- Events: Finding of Romulus and Remus
- Ancient Roman religion: Temple of Apollo Palatinus, Temple of Cybele, Lupercalia, Secular Games
- Mythological figures: Romulus and Remus, Faustulus

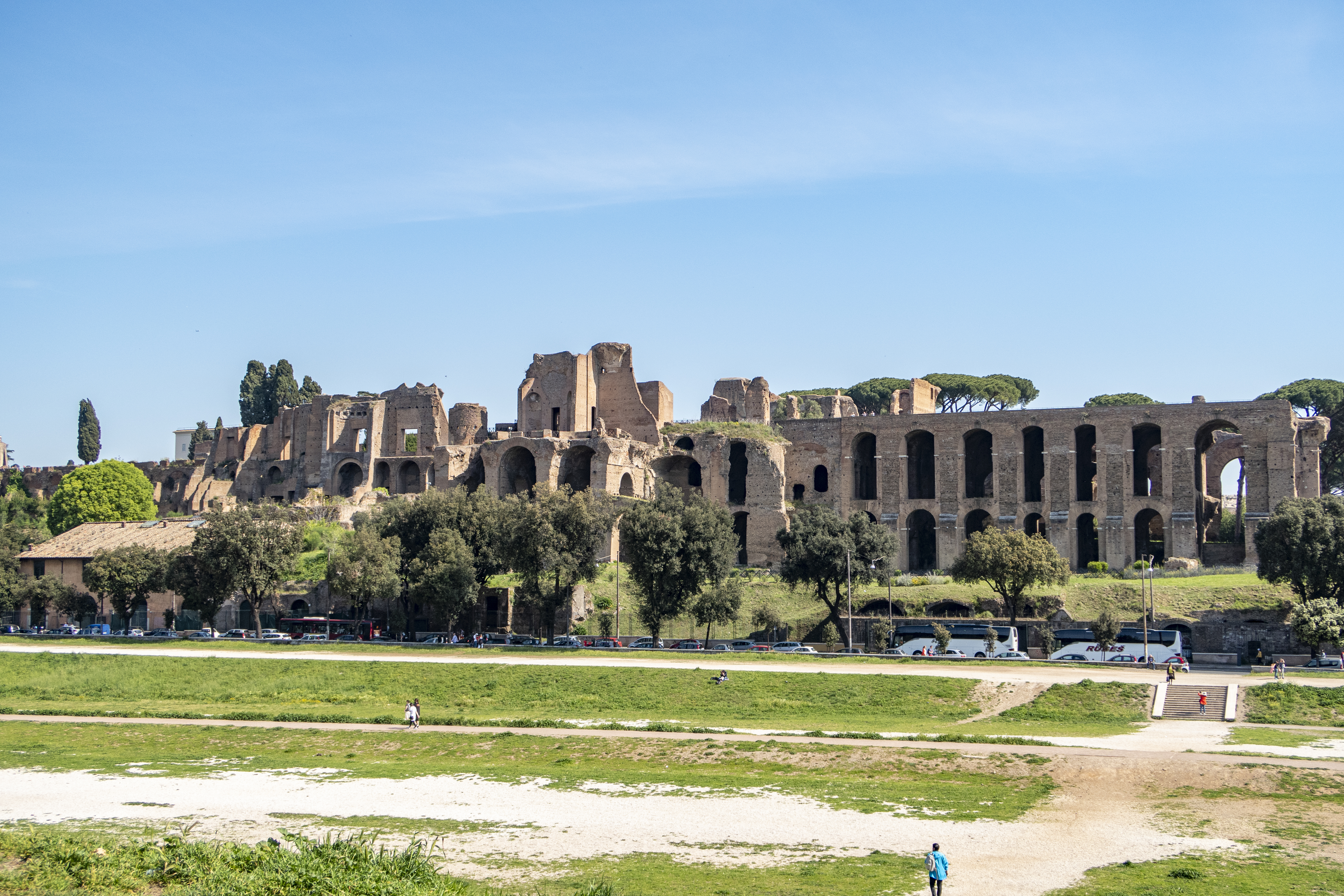
View of the Palatine Hill from across the Circus Maximus

A schematic map of Rome showing the seven hills and the Servian Wall

The Palatine Hill (/ˈpælətaɪn/ PAL-ə-tyne; Classical Latin: Palatium; New Latin: Collis/Mons Palatinus; Italian: Palatino [palaˈtiːno]), which is the centremost of the seven hills of Rome, is one of the most ancient parts of the city; it has been called "the first nucleus of the Roman Empire". The site is now mainly a large open-air museum and the Palatine Museum houses many finds from the excavations here and from other ancient Italian sites.

Imperial palaces were built there, starting with Augustus. Before imperial times the hill was mostly occupied by the houses of the rich.

The hill originally had two summits separated by a depression: the higher summit was called Palatium; the lower Germalus (or Cermalus). Using the Forma Urbis its perimeter enclosed 63 acres (25 ha); while the Regionary Catalogues of the 4th century enclose 131 acres (53 ha).

== Etymology ==
According to Livy (59 BC – AD 17) the Palatine hill got its name from the Arcadian settlers from Pallantium, named from its founder Pallas, son of Lycaon. More likely, it is derived from the noun palātum "palate"; Ennius uses it once for the "heaven", and it may be connected with the Etruscan word for sky, falad.

The name of the hill is the etymological origin of the word palace and its cognates in other languages (Greek: παλάτιον, Italian: palazzo, French: palais, Spanish: palacio, Portuguese: paço and palácio, German: Pfalz and Palast, Czech: palác, Croatian: palača, etc.).

The Palatine Hill is also the etymological origin (via the Latin adjective palatinus) of "palatine", a 16th-century English adjective that originally signified something pertaining to the Caesar's palace, or someone who is invested with the king's authority. Later its use shifted to a reference to the German Palatinate. The office of the German count palatine (Pfalzgraf) had its origins in the comes palatinus, an earlier office in Merovingian and Carolingian times.

Another modern English word, "paladin", came into usage to refer to any distinguished knight (especially one of the Twelve Peers of Charlemagne) under Charlemagne in late renditions of the Matter of France. (Note: This word came into use after an obsolete English "palasin" (from OF palaisin) came into disuse.)

== Mythology ==
According to Roman mythology, the Palatine Hill was the location of the cave, known as the Lupercal, where Romulus and Remus were found by the she-wolf Lupa that kept them alive. This is also the hill on which the adult Romulus chose to found the city, and where he murdered his brother Remus. This ritualistic murder on the Palatine formed an important part of Roman identity and the mythological origins of the Pomerium.

Another legend occurring on the Palatine is Hercules' defeat of Cacus after the monster had stolen some cattle. Hercules struck Cacus with his characteristic club so hard that it formed a cleft on the southeast corner of the hill, where later a staircase bearing the name of Cacus was constructed.

== History ==
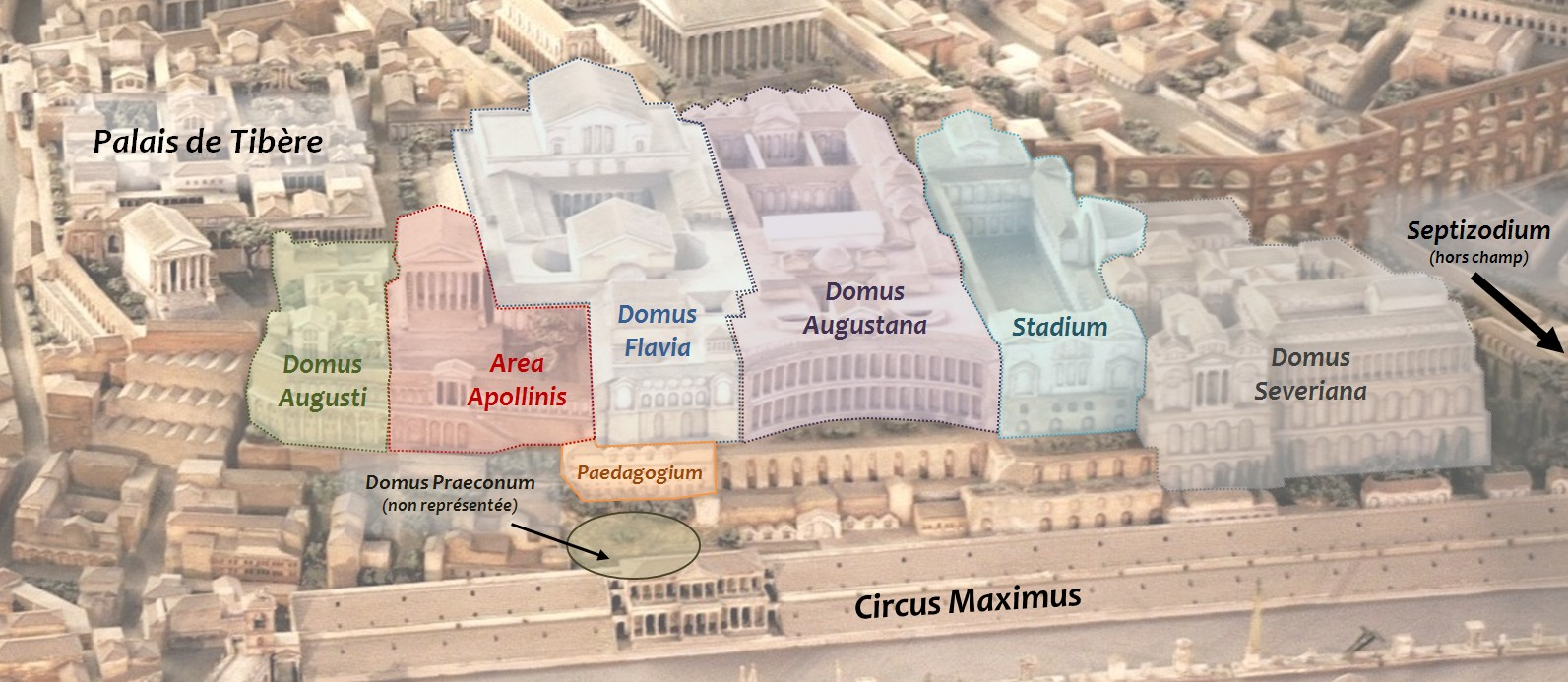
Palaces on the Palatine

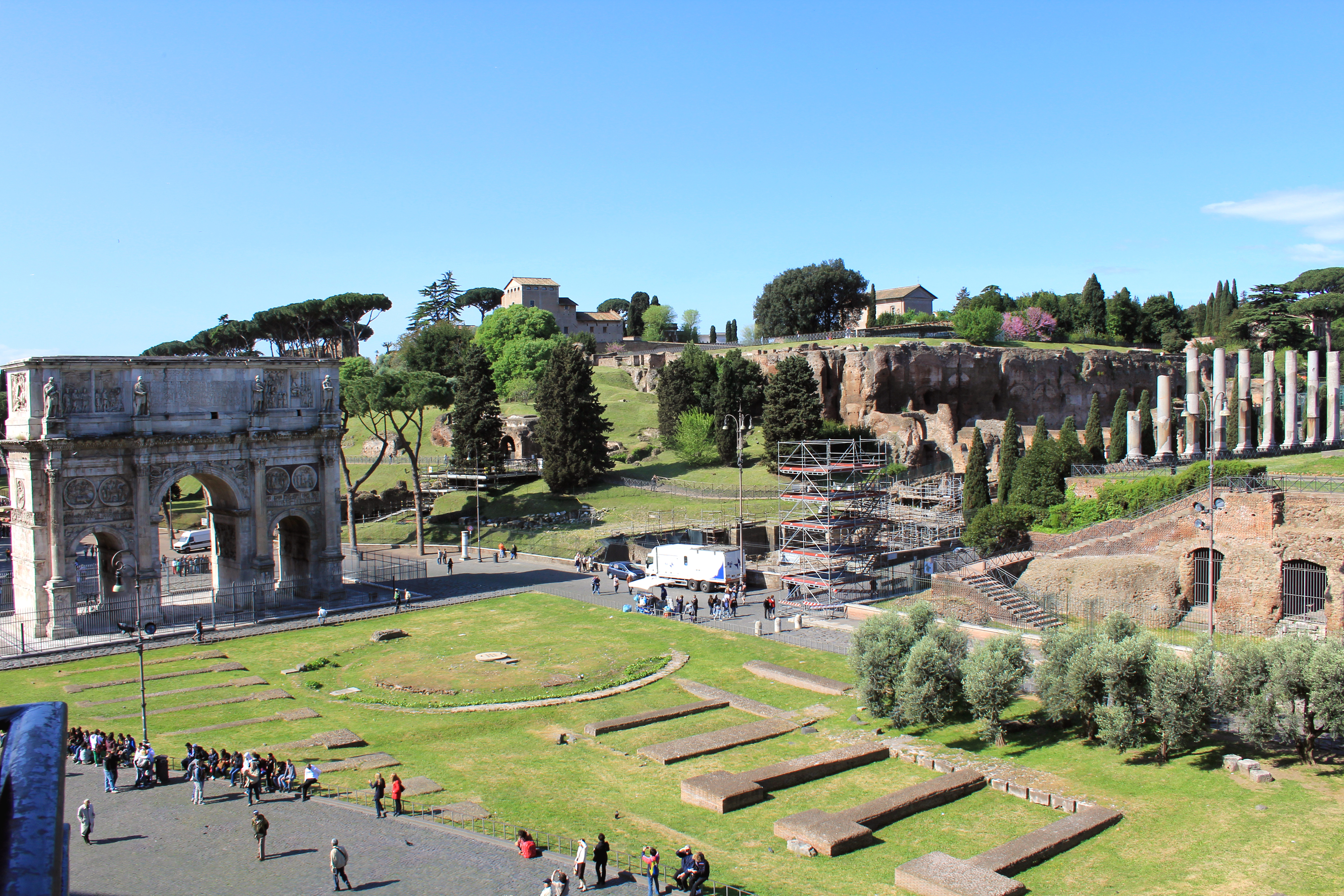
Palatine Hill from the Colosseum

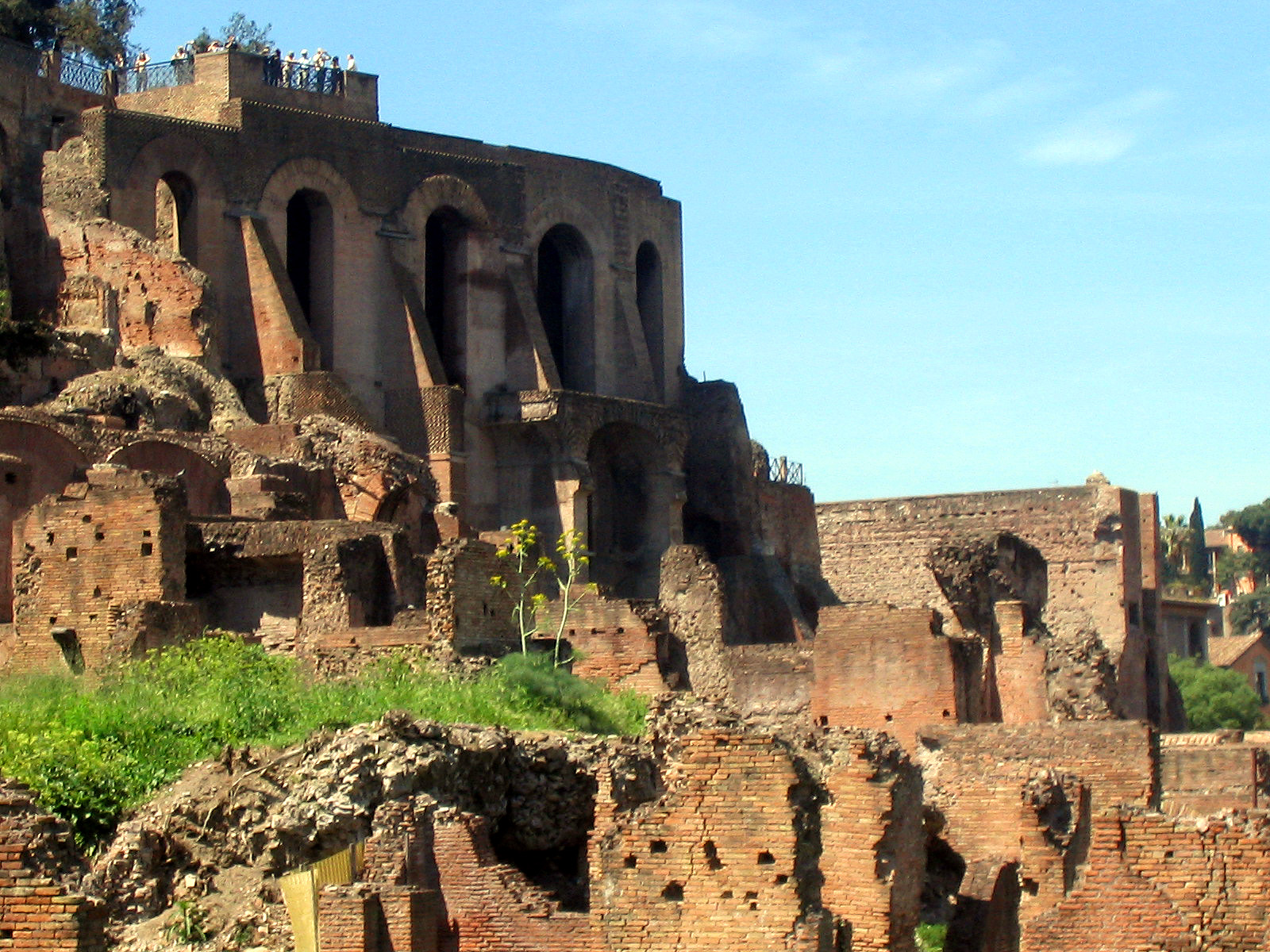
Massive retaining walls extended the area on the Palatine available for the Imperial building complex.

Rome has its origins on the Palatine. Excavations show that people have lived in the area since the 10th century BC. Excavations performed on the hill in 1907 and again in 1948 unearthed a collection of huts believed to have been used for funerary purposes between the 9th and 7th century BC approximating the time period when the city of Rome was founded.

Pallantium was an ancient city near the Tiber river on the Italian peninsula. Roman mythology, as recounted in Virgil's Aeneid for example, states that the city was founded by Evander of Pallene and other ancient Greeks sometime previous to the Trojan War. In addition, Dionysius of Halicarnassus writes that Romans say that the city was founded by Greeks from Pallantium of Arcadia, about sixty years before the Trojan war and the leader was Evander. The myth of the city's origin was significant in ancient Roman mythology because Pallantium became one of the cities that was merged later into ancient Rome, thereby tying Rome's origins to the ancient Greek heroes. Other cities in the area were founded by various Italic tribes.

Virgil states that Evander named the city in honor of his ancestor, Pallas, although Pausanias as well as Dionysius of Halicarnassus say that Evander's birth city was Pallantium, and thus he named the new city after the one in Arcadia. Dionysius of Halicarnassus also mention that some writers, including Polybius of Megalopolis, say that the town was named after Pallas, who was the son of Heracles and Lavinia, the daughter of Evander, and when he died his grandfather raised a tomb to him on the hill and called the place Pallantium, after him.

According to Livy, after the immigration of the Sabines and the Albans to Rome, the original Romans lived on the Palatine. The Palatine Hill was also the site of the ancient festival of the Lupercalia.

Many affluent Romans of the Republican period (c. 509 BC – 44 BC) had their residences there.

From the start of the Empire (27 BC) Augustus built his palace there and the hill gradually became the exclusive domain of emperors; the ruins of the palaces of at least Augustus (27 BC – 14 AD), Tiberius (14–37 AD) and Domitian (81–96 AD) can still be seen.

Augustus also built a temple to Apollo here.

The Great Fire of Rome in AD 64 destroyed Nero's palace, the Domus Transitoria, but he replaced it by AD 69 with the even larger Domus Aurea, over which was eventually built Domitian's Palace.

From the 16th century, the hill was owned by the Farnese family and was occupied by the Farnese Gardens, still partially preserved above the remains of the Domus Tiberiana.

At the top of the hill, between the Domus Flavia and the Domus Augustana, the Villa Mattei was built in the 16th century, then purchased around 1830 by the Scot Charles Mills who turned it into an elaborate neo-Gothic villa. At the end of the 19th century the villa was converted into a convent. This was partially demolished from 1928 to allow excavations and in the surviving part of the building the Palatine Museum has been installed.

== Monuments ==
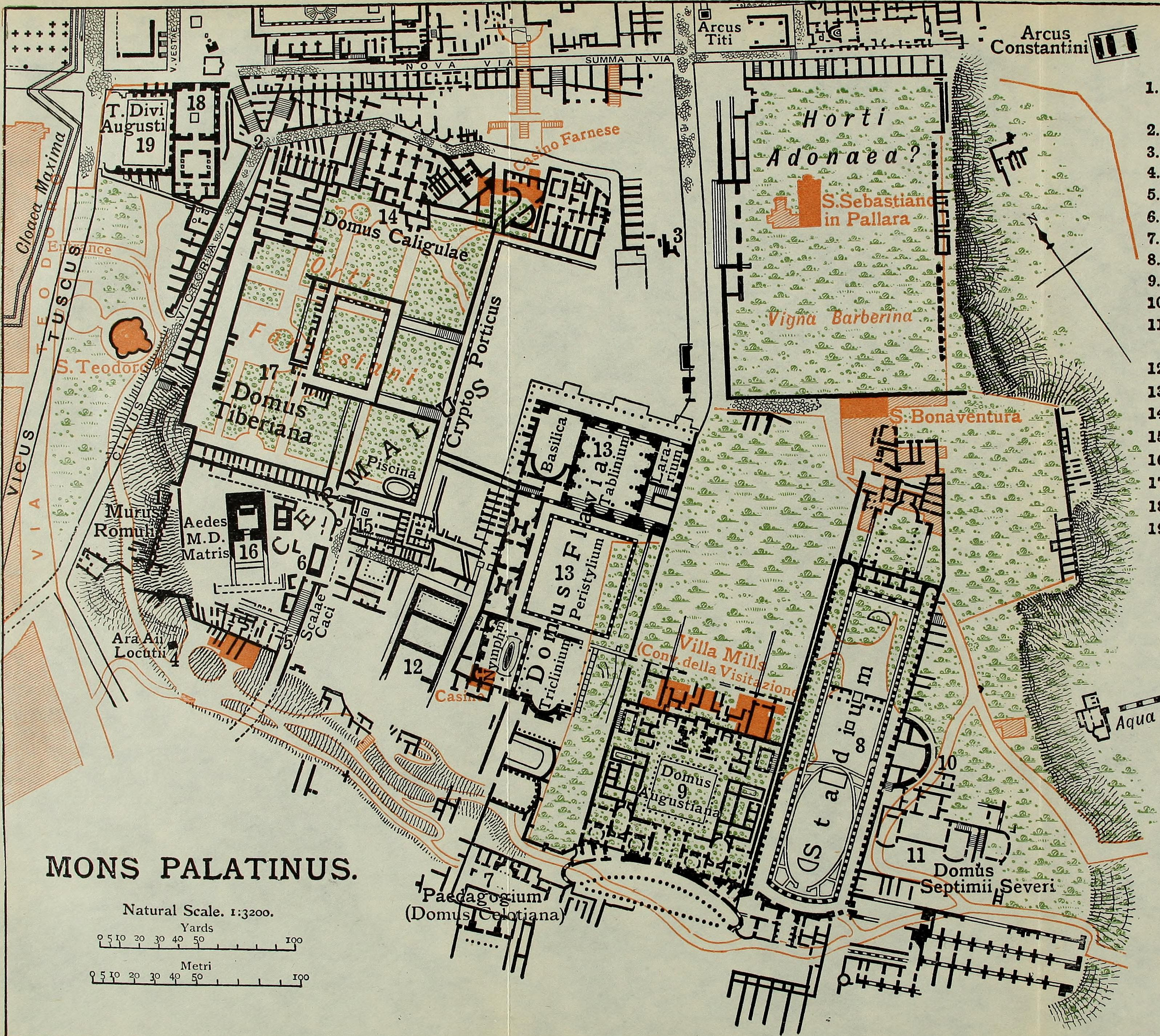
Plan of the Palatine with modern buildings overlaid

Dominating the site is the Palace of Domitian which was rebuilt largely during the reign of Domitian over earlier buildings of Nero. Later emperors, particularly those of the Severan Dynasty, made significant additions to the buildings, notably the Domus Severiana.

=== Houses of Livia and Augustus ===
The House of Livia, the wife of Augustus, is conventionally attributed to her based only on the generic name on a lead pipe and circumstantial factors such as proximity to the House of Augustus.

The building is located near the Temple of Magna Mater at the western end of the hill, on a lower terrace from the temple. It is notable for its frescoes.

=== House of Tiberius ===
Known as the Domus Tiberiana because the original house was built by Tiberius, he spent much of his time in his palaces in Campania and Capri. It was later incorporated into Nero's Domus Transitoria. Part of its remains lie in the current Farnese Gardens.

== Excavations ==
Already during Augustus' reign an area of the Palatine Hill was subject to a sort of archaeological expedition which found fragments of Bronze Age pots and tools. He declared this site the "original town of Rome." Modern archaeology has identified evidence of Bronze Age settlement in the area which predates Rome's founding.

Intensive archaeological excavations began in the 18th century and culminated in the late 19th century, after the proclamation of Rome as the capital of the Kingdom of Italy. Discoveries continued sporadically throughout the 20th century until the present time.

The photo of the excavated cave beneath the Domus Livia on the Palatine Hill, perhaps the Lupercal

In 2006, archaeologists announced the discovery of the Palatine House, believed to be the birthplace of Rome's first Emperor, Augustus. A section of corridor and other fragments under the Hill were found and described as "a very ancient aristocratic house." The two-story house appears to have been built around an atrium, with frescoed walls and mosaic flooring, and is situated on the slope of the Palatine that overlooks the Colosseum and the Arch of Constantine. The Republican-era houses on the Palatine were overbuilt by later palaces after the Great Fire of Rome (AD 64), but apparently this one was not and perhaps was preserved for an important reason. On the ground floor, three shops opened onto the Via Sacra. The location of the domus is significant because of its potential proximity to the Curiae Veteres, the earliest shrine of the curies of Rome.

In 2007 the legendary Lupercal cave was claimed to have been found beneath the remains of the Domus Livia (House of Livia) on the Palatine. Archaeologists came across the 16-metre-deep cavity while restoring the decaying palace, with a richly decorated vault encrusted with mosaics and seashells. The Lupercal was probably converted to a sanctuary by Romans in later centuries. Many others have denied its identification with the Lupercal on topographic and stylistic grounds, and believe that the grotto is actually a nymphaeum or underground triclinium from Neronian times.

== See also ==
- Aventine Hill (Aventino)
- Caelian Hill (Celio)
- Capitoline Hill (Capitolino)
- Cispian Hill (Cispio)
- Esquiline Hill (Esquilino)
- Janiculum Hill (Gianicolo)
- Monte Mario
- Oppian Hill (Oppio)
- Pincian Hill (Pincio)
- Quirinal Hill (Quirinale)
- Vatican Hill (Vaticano)
- Velian Hill (Velia)
- Viminal Hill (Viminale)
