= Friseria paphlactis =

Scientific classification
- Kingdom: Animalia
- Phylum: Arthropoda
- Class: Insecta
- Order: Lepidoptera
- Family: Gelechiidae
- Genus: Friseria
- Species: F. paphlactis

Binomial name
- Friseria paphlactis (Meyrick, 1912)

Synonyms
- Gelechia paphlactis Meyrick, 1912

Species of moth

Friseria paphlactis is a moth of the family Gelechiidae. It is found in Brazil (São Paulo).

The wingspan is about 15 mm. The forewings are white, the dorsal area tinged with grey. The markings are grey suffusedly irrorated with blackish and with a spot on the costa at the base, and three others between this and three-fourths. There is a small spot on the dorsum at one-fourth, two obliquely placed in disc beyond this, and two others similarly placed in the middle, lower on the fold and somewhat raised. Two or three undefined dots are found in the disc beyond this, and a spot on the dorsum before the tornus and a series of cloudy dots around the posterior part of the costa and termen, and some irregular marking in the apical area. The hindwings are grey, paler and thinly scaled towards the base.
