= Friseria repentina =

Scientific classification
- Kingdom: Animalia
- Phylum: Arthropoda
- Class: Insecta
- Order: Lepidoptera
- Family: Gelechiidae
- Genus: Friseria
- Species: F. repentina

Binomial name
- Friseria repentina (Walsingham, 1911)

Synonyms
- Gelechia repentina Walsingham, 1911

Species of moth

Friseria repentina is a moth of the family Gelechiidae. It is found in Mexico (Guerrero).

The wingspan is 12–16 mm. The forewings are brownish ochreous, mottled with fuscous and with a broad bluish fuscous band across their middle, occupying a space equal to half their length, its inner and outer margins both inclining to be concave and somewhat darker than the centre. There are a few reddish ochreous scales beyond the end of the cell, merged in a diffused fuscous shade extending to the apex. The hindwings are pale greyish brown, slightly transparent near their base.
