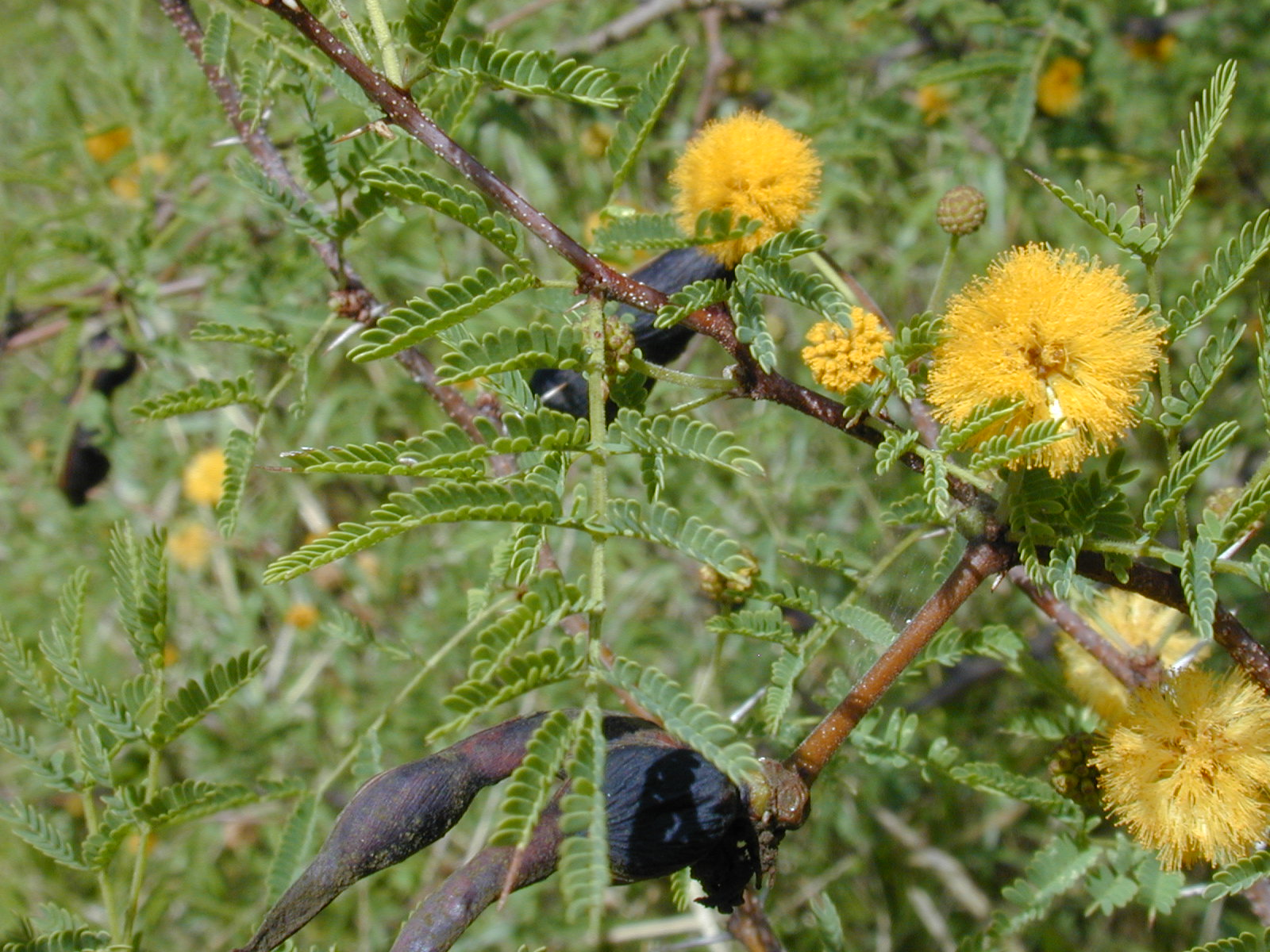

Conservation status
- Secure (NatureServe)

- Least Concern (IUCN 3.1)

Scientific classification
- Kingdom: Plantae
- Clade: Tracheophytes
- Clade: Angiosperms
- Clade: Eudicots
- Clade: Rosids
- Order: Fabales
- Family: Fabaceae
- Subfamily: Caesalpinioideae
- Clade: Mimosoid clade
- Genus: Vachellia
- Species: V. farnesiana

Binomial name
- Vachellia farnesiana (L.) Wight et Arn.

Varieties (all currently disputed)
- Vachellia farnesiana var. farnesiana (L.) Willd.; Vachellia farnesiana var. guanacastensis H.D.Clarke et al.; Vachellia farnesiana var. pinetorum (F.J. Herm.) Seigler & Ebinger
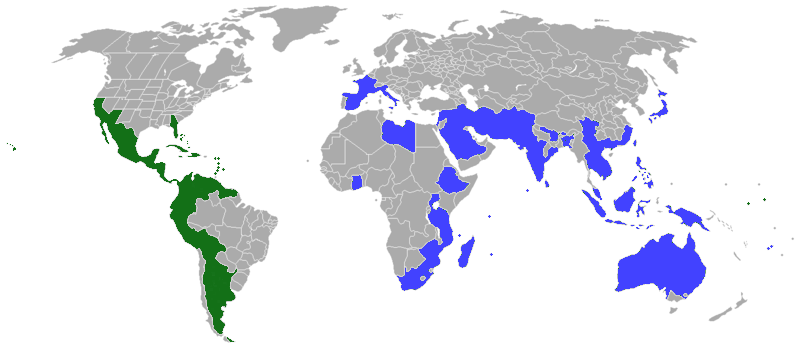

Synonyms
- Acacia farnesiana var. farnesiana (L.) Wight et Arn.; Acacia acicularis Humb. & Bonpl. ex. Willd.; Acacia densiflora (Small) Cory; Acacia farnesiana (L.) Willd.; Acacia farnesiana var. lenticellata (F.Muell.) Bailey; Acacia farnesiana subsp. pinetorum (F.J.Herm.) Ebinger, Seigler & H.D.Clarke; Acacia ferox M.Martens & Galeotti; Acacia indica (Poir.) Desv.; Acacia lenticellata F. Muell.; Acacia minuta (M.E. Jones) R.M. Beauch.; Acacia minuta subsp. minuta (M.E.Jones) R.M. Beauch.; Acacia minuta subsp. densiflora (Alexander ex Small) R.M.Beauch.; Acacia pedunculata Willd.; Acacia pinetorum F.J.Herm.; Acacia smallii Isely; Farnesia odora Gasp.; Farnesiana odora Gasp.; Mimosa acicularis Poir.; Mimosa farnesiana L.; Mimosa indica Poir.; Mimosa suaveolens Salisb.; Pithecellobium acuminatum M.E. Jones; Pithecellobium minutum M.E. Jones; Popanax farnesiana (L.) Raf.; Poponax farnesiana (L.) Raf.; Vachellia densiflora Small

= Vachellia farnesiana =

Species of plant

Vachellia farnesiana, also known as Acacia farnesiana, and previously Mimosa farnesiana, commonly known as sweet acacia, huisache, casha tree, or needle bush, is a species of shrub or small tree in the legume family, Fabaceae. Its flowers are used in the perfume industry.

== Description ==
The plant is deciduous over part of its range, but evergreen in most locales. Growing from multiple trunks, it reaches a height of 4.6–9.1 metres (15–30 feet). The bark is whitish gray. The base of each leaf is accompanied by a pair of thorns on the branch. The dark brown fruit is a seed pod.

== Taxonomy ==
=== Taxonomic history ===
It was first described by Europeans under the name Acacia Indica Farnesiana in 1625 by Tobias Aldini from plants grown in Rome in the Farnese Gardens from seed collected in Santo Domingo, in what is now the Dominican Republic, which germinated in 1611. Aldini included an illustration of the plant, which he contrasted with an illustration of the first known Acacia; Acacia nilotica. This first (European) illustration of the plant was later designated as the (lecto-)type. In 1753, Carl Linnaeus used Aldini's work as basis for his taxon Mimosa farnesiana. In 1806 Carl Ludwig Willdenow moved this taxon to the genus Acacia.

Partly due to its wide distributional range, the taxon has attracted many synonyms. Especially in the United States, taxonomy has been confused.

In 1809, Willdenow described Acacia acicularis from Central America collected and named during Humboldt and Bonpland's scientific expedition to the Americas. Acacia ferox was described in 1843 in Belgium from collections in Mexico. Acacia lenticellata was described in 1859 for the plants found growing throughout Australia.

In the Prodromus Florae Peninsulae Indiae Orientalis of 1834, Wight & Arnott, attempted to split the burgeoning genus Acacia by moving a number of the Acacia species growing in India to the new genus Vachellia.

This was not widely followed, nonetheless in 1933, Small verified Alexander's name Vachellia densiflora for plants growing in Louisiana, and awarded V. peninsularis and V. insularis to different populations of the plants growing in Florida.

In 1936, Cory moved Vachellia densiflora to Acacia densiflora, but as this name had already been used for another taxon, and was therefore invalidated sensu Cory, in 1969, this taxon was renamed A. smallii by Isely. In 1948, F. J. Herm. synonymised Vachellia peninsularis and V. insularis under Acacia pinetorum.

In 1933, M. E. Jones named plants he collected in Mexico Pithecellobium minutum. This taxon was moved to Acacia minuta by R. Mitchel Beauchamp in 1980. Beauchamp also subsumed A. smallii under A. minuta subsp. densiflora, although this was not widely followed.

Acacia smallii was used in the U.S. for the 'native' A. farnesiana growing in the drylands west of Louisiana, but at the same time, the taxon A. farnesiana was recognised in the U.S. for purportedly imported non-native plants originally cultivated in the Southeastern U.S. as ornamentals and later thought naturalised there. Additionally, in Florida, A. pinetorum was recognised as a rare endemic native.

A paper in 1989 by H. D. Clarke, D. S. Seigler and J. E. Ebinger finally cleared up some of this confusion, synonymising Acacia smallii and a number of other taxa under the nominate form of A. farnesiana, under which they also included all of the plants growing outside of the Americas. In the same paper, they recognised A. farnesiana var. guanacastensis from herbarium collections made by D. H. Janzen in 1976 in Guanacaste, Costa Rica. This taxon was later elevated to species status as A. guanacastensis by the same three in 2000 and later moved to Vachellia guanacastensis by Seigler and Ebinger in 2006.

Acacia pinetorum was subsumed under A. farnesiana as A. farnesiana subsp. pinetorum in 2002 by Clarke, Seigler and Ebinger (rendering the nominate form A. farnesiana subsp. farnesiana). Seigler and Ebinger later reclassified this as Vachellia farnesiana var. pinetorum in 2005.

=== Infraspecific diversity ===
Acacia farnesiana var. guanacastensis is primarily distinguished by larger leaflets. It remains controversial; most taxonomic authorities in Mexico and Central America recognise this taxon as a full species under either A. guanacastensis or Vachellia guanacastensis, the Árboles nativos e introduciados de El Salvador of 2009 subsumed it under Acacia farnesiana. It is recognised as present in Costa Rica, El Salvador, Guatemala, Nicaragua, and the southern Gulf and southwestern regions of Mexico by the Kew World Checklist of Selected Plant Families (2018), but whether the taxon as recognised by the different authorities replaces Acacia farnesiana in Central America (but not the Caribbean or South America) or exists sympatrically remains unclear. This has implications for the classification of the extra-American distribution of A. farnesiana as the populations growing in Australia and the Philippines have recently (2017) been shown to derive from ancient Central American origins.

Acacia pinetorum, the pineland acacia or pineland wattle, is also disputed. The International Legume Database and Information Service continues to recognise A. pinetorum, while the U.S. Department of Agriculture recognises V. farnesiana var. pinetorum.

In France, two old cultivars have been developed for the perfume industry. These were also recognised as varieties at one time.

=== Etymology ===
The specific name farnesiana honors Odoardo Farnese (1573–1626) of the notable Italian Farnese family, which after 1550, under the patronage of Cardinal Alessandro Farnese, maintained some of the first private European botanical gardens in Rome, the Farnese Gardens, in the 16th and 17th centuries.

This acacia was first described from these gardens, imported to Italy from Santo Domingo, in what is now the Dominican Republic.

Analysis of essences of the floral extract from this plant, long used in perfumery, resulted in the name for the sesquiterpene biosynthetic chemical farnesol, found as a basic sterol precursor in plants, and cholesterol precursor in animals.

The name huisache of Mexico and Texas is derived from Nahuatl and means "many thorns". The Australian name needle bush came about because of the numerous thorns distributed along its branches.

== Distribution and habitat ==
Of all Acacia species, this plant has the greatest distribution. It was first described by Europeans in 1625 by Tobias Aldini from plants grown from seed collected in Santo Domingo, in what is now the Dominican Republic. The native range of V. farnesiana has been or is sometimes disputed. While the point of origin is thought to be the Caribbean, the Guianas, Mexico, and/or Central America, the species has a pantropical distribution incorporating most of the Americas (from the Southern U.S. to Chile, excluding the Amazon), most of Australia, much of Africa, southern Europe, and southern Asia. In the Caribbean, it is present from the Bahamas and Cuba south to Trinidad, Curaçao, and Aruba, where in it is believed to be native to Hispaniola and certainly Cuba, but possibly native or naturalised elsewhere. In the U.S., it is thought to be native to southern Texas, southern New Mexico, southern Arizona, and southern California, but perhaps naturalized in southern Louisiana, coastal Mississippi, coastal Alabama, coastal Georgia, and southern Florida. Whether the extra-American distribution is natural (the seed pods have probably floated across the Pacific) or anthropogenic remains disputed. It was introduced to Europe, the Middle East, India, Africa, and recently Gran Canaria and Hawaii. It has long been thought to be native to the Philippines and Australia, having spread there by natural means, because plants were collected there before colonisation in 1788, it was distributed throughout the country, indigenous knowledge on the plant is extensive, and 2017 DNA investigations show this as most likely. In Australia, however, the government now considers it as non-native or even invasive.

The plant prefers full sunlight in a tropical climate.

== Ecology ==
Deer and peccaries eat its fruit, various birds use the plant for nesting and cover, and insects eat the nectar from its flowers. If disturbed, it readily resprouts. It thrives in dry, saline, or sodic soils.

It is considered a serious pest plant in parts of Australia, as it interferes with cattle-ranching operations. It readily spreads in commercial grazing pastures, especially along creeks, which might affect ease of transport for farmers, complicates muster, and can damage farm machinery. The seeds are dispersed by cattle after they eat the nutritious pods, and growth is promoted by overgrazing. Numerous herbicides are used to control it on ranches; chemical control is the only way to kill it. The plant has been spread to many new locations as a result of human activity, and it is considered a serious weed in Fiji, where locals call it Ellington's curse.

== Uses ==
=== Perfume ===
The flowers are processed through distillation to produce a perfume called cassie, which has been described as "delicious". It is widely used in the perfume industry in Europe. Flowers of the plant provide the perfume essence from which the biologically important sesquiterpenoid farnesol is named.

Scented ointments from cassie are made in India.

=== Gum ===
It exudes a gum, which is sometimes collected.

=== Tanning leather ===
The bark is used for its tannin content. The concentration of tannin in the seed pods is about 23%. Highly tannic barks are common in general to acacias. Extracts of many are used in medicine for this reason.

=== Food ===
The plant's young leaves, flowers, and seed pods are edible raw or cooked.

=== Fodder and forage ===
The foliage is a significant source of forage in much of its range, with a protein content around 18%. The tree makes good forage for bees. The seed pods are readily eaten by livestock.

=== Ornamental ===
This drought-tolerant species is often used in xeriscaping in Texas.

=== Dyes and inks ===
A black pigment is extracted from the bark and fruit.

=== Traditional medicine ===
In Brazil, some people use the seeds of V. farnesiana to kill rabid dogs. V. farnesiana has been used in Colombia to treat malaria, and in one in vitro study, an ethanol extract from the leaves showed some activity against the malarial pathogen Plasmodium falciparum with an IC_{50} value of 1 to 2 microgram/millilitre (as did almost everything tested), though it showed no activity in animal models or a ferriprotoporphyrin biomineralization inhibition test. In the Philippines the leaves are traditionally rubbed on the skin to treat skin diseases in livestock. In Malaysia, an infusion of the plant's flowers and leaves is mixed with turmeric for post-partum treatment.

== Gallery ==
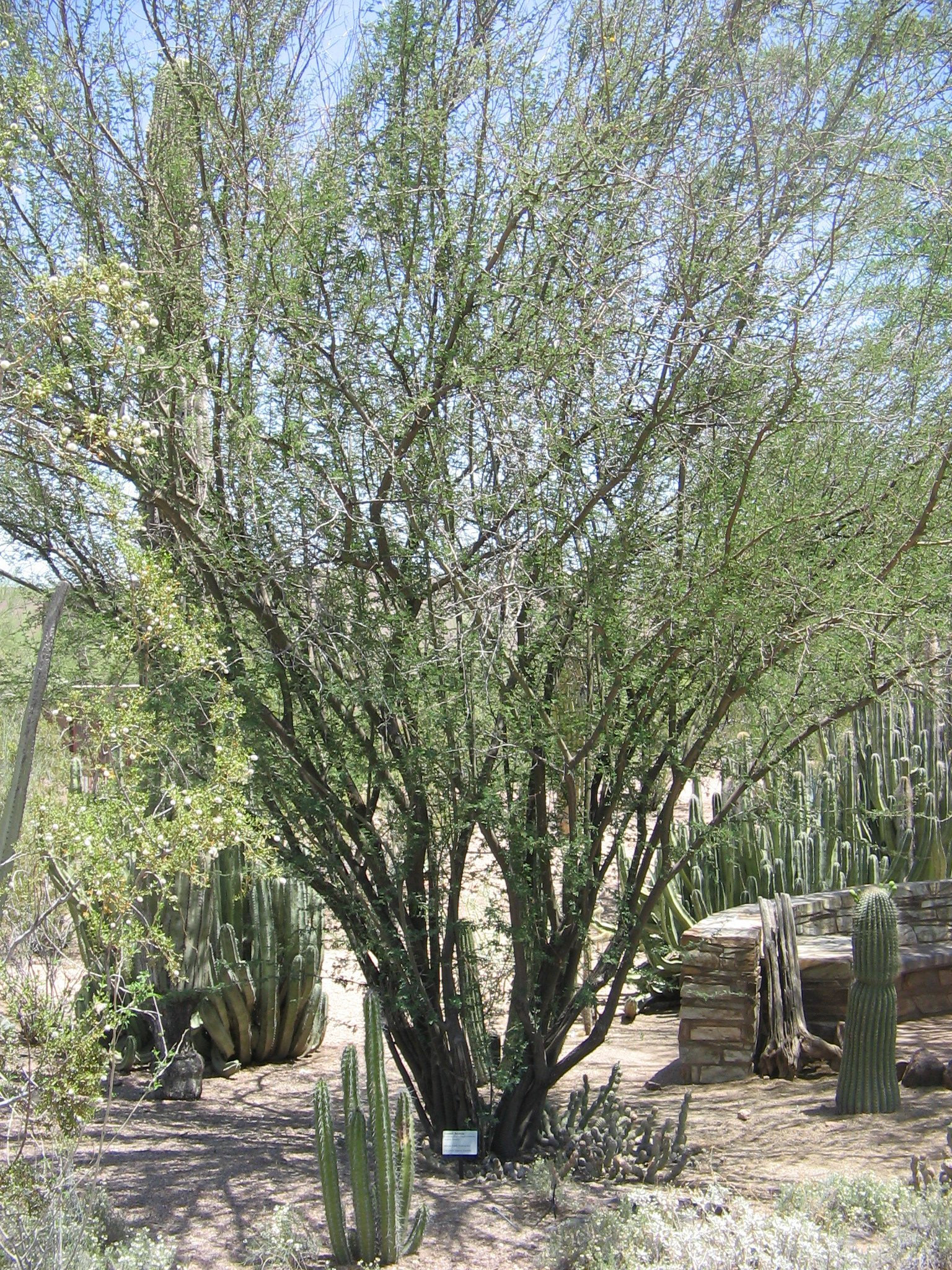
Habit

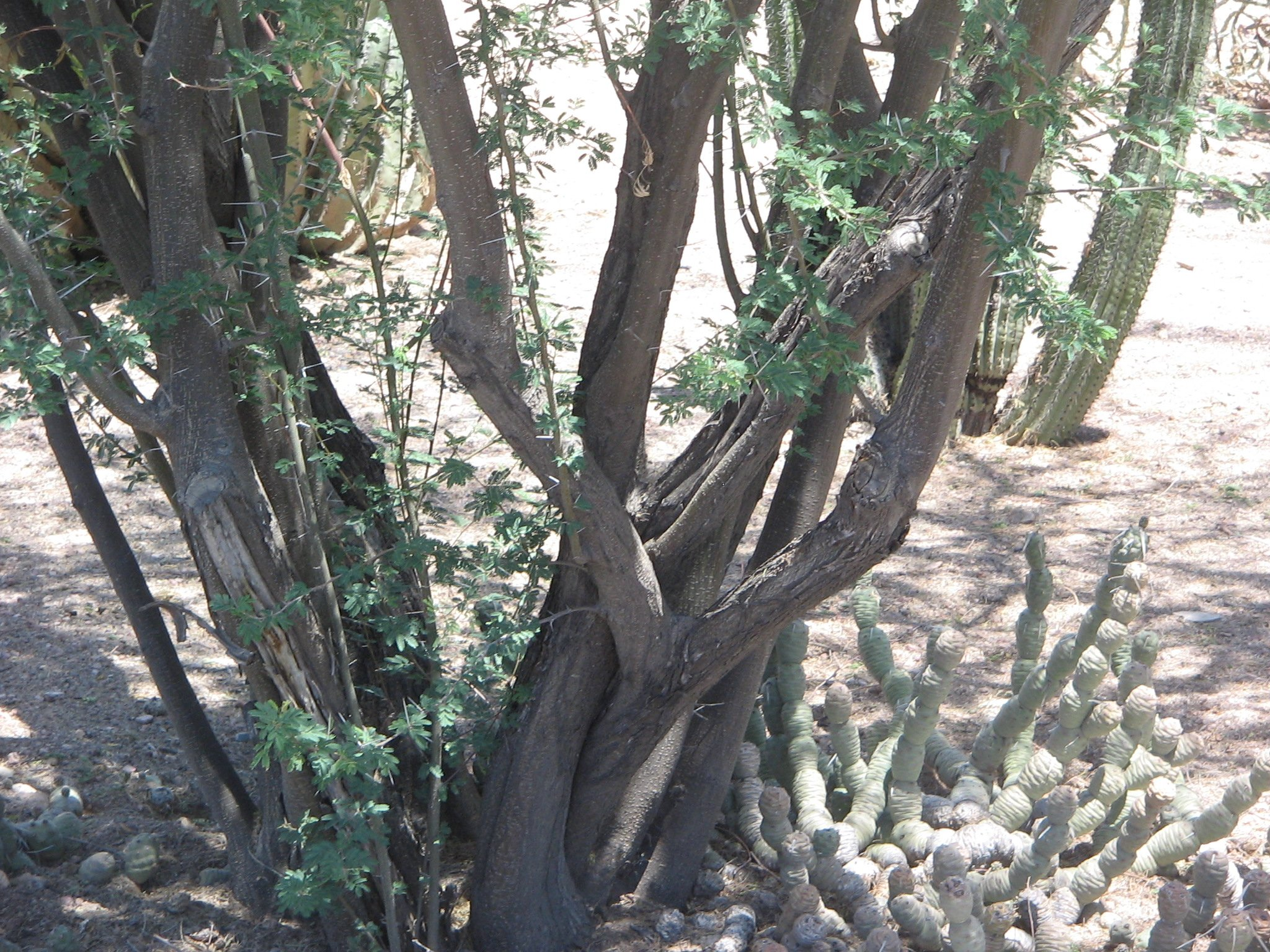
Bark and thorns

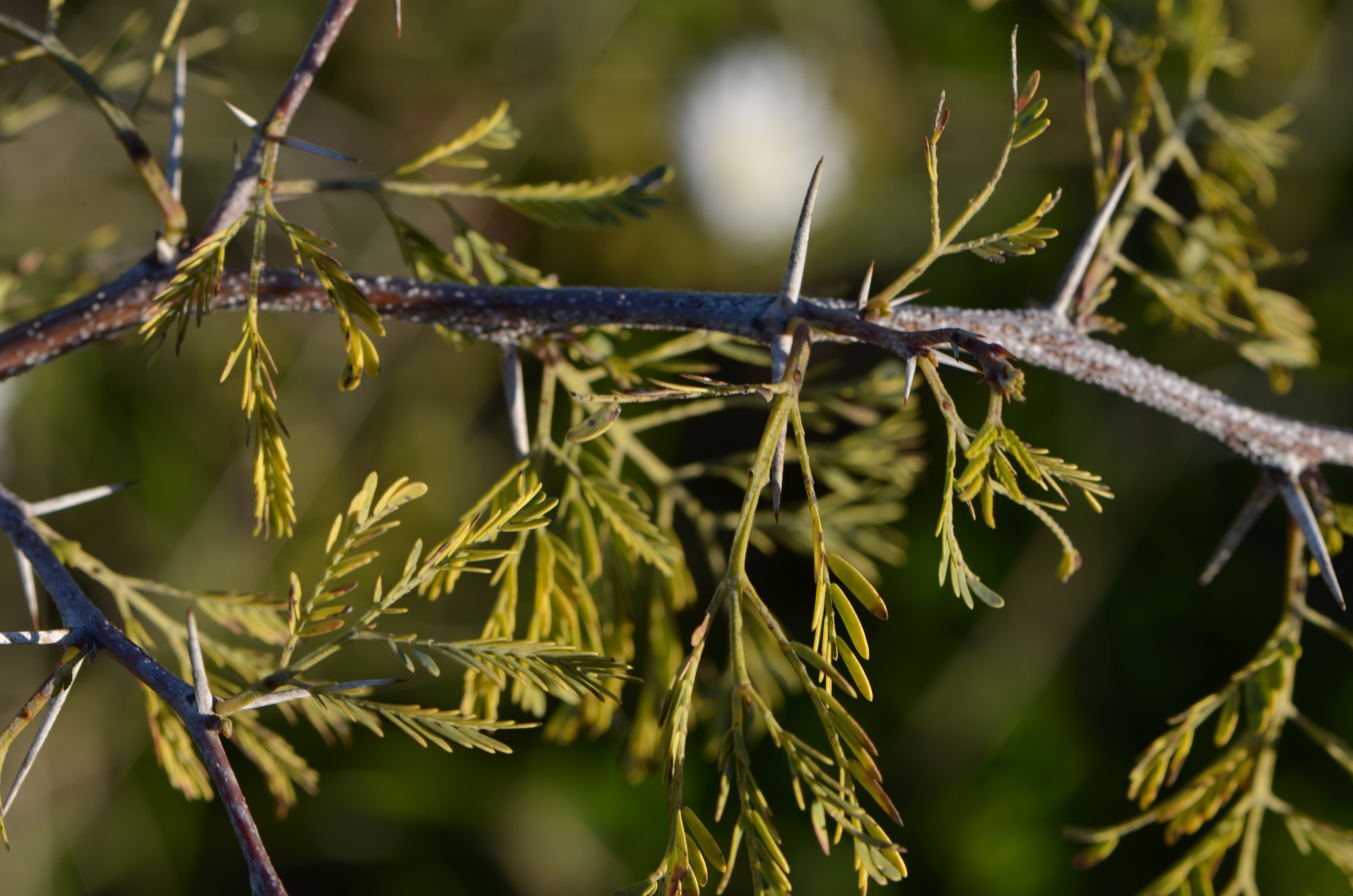
Thorns and leaves

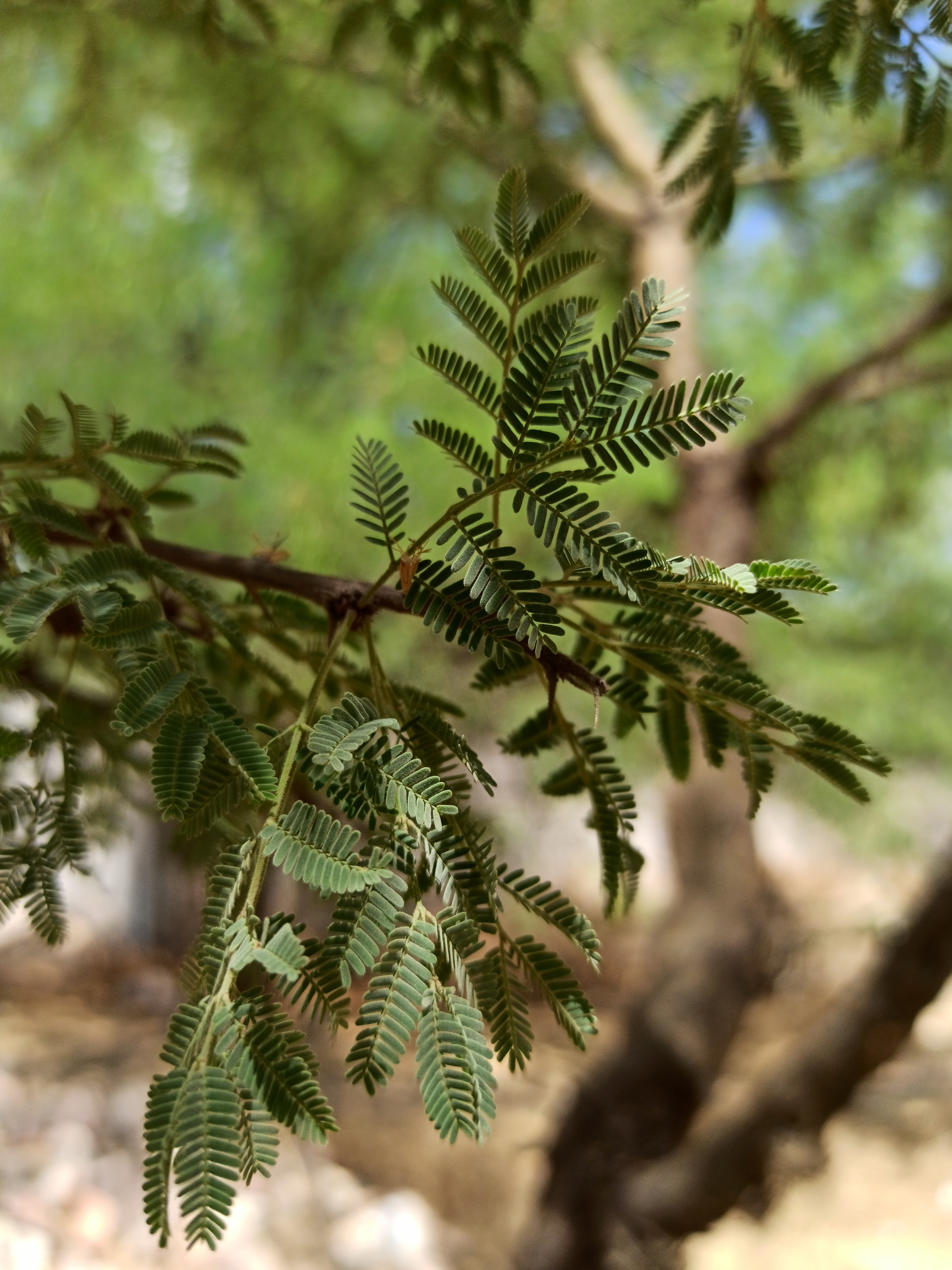
Leaves

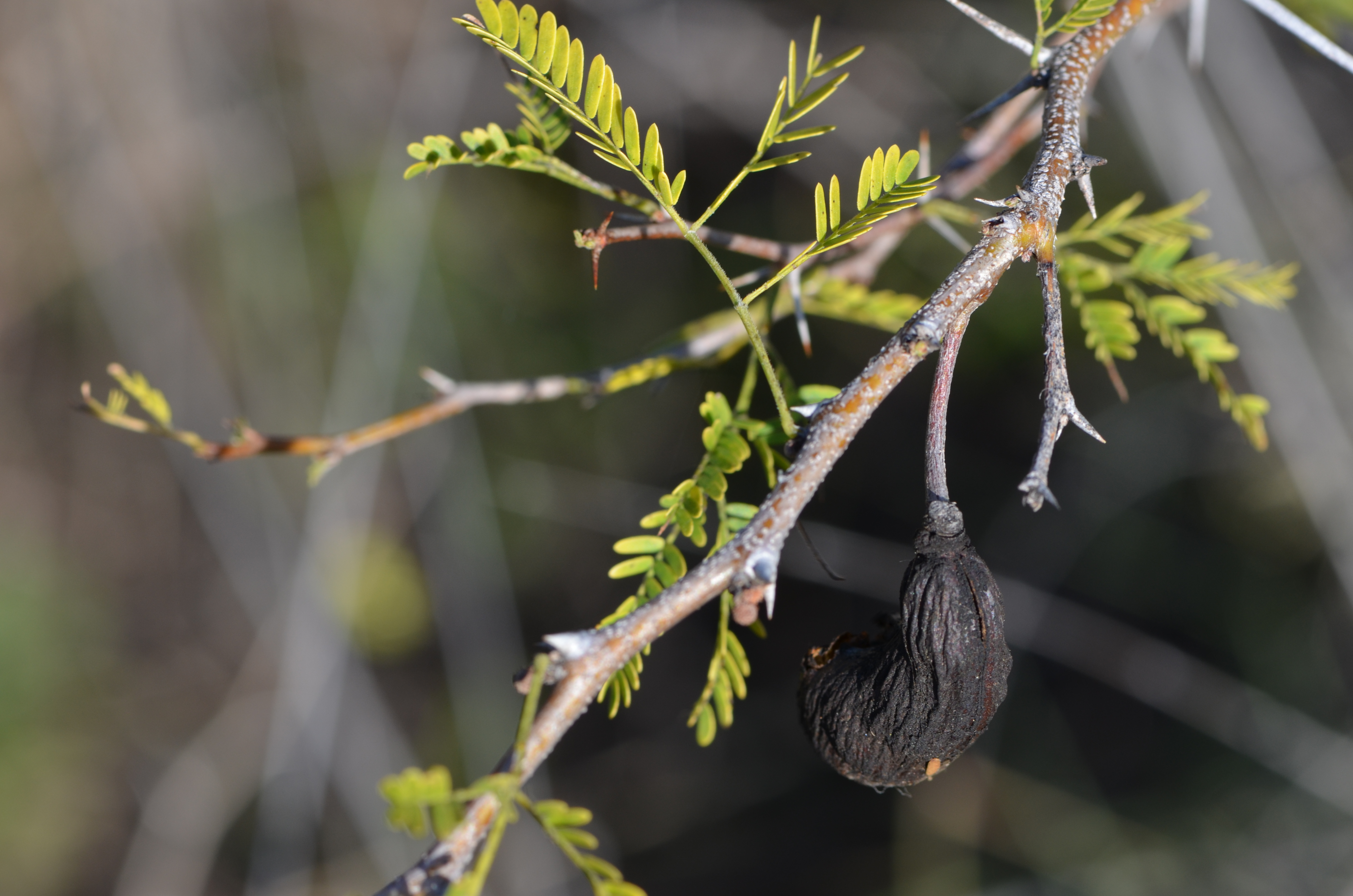
Foliage with seed pods

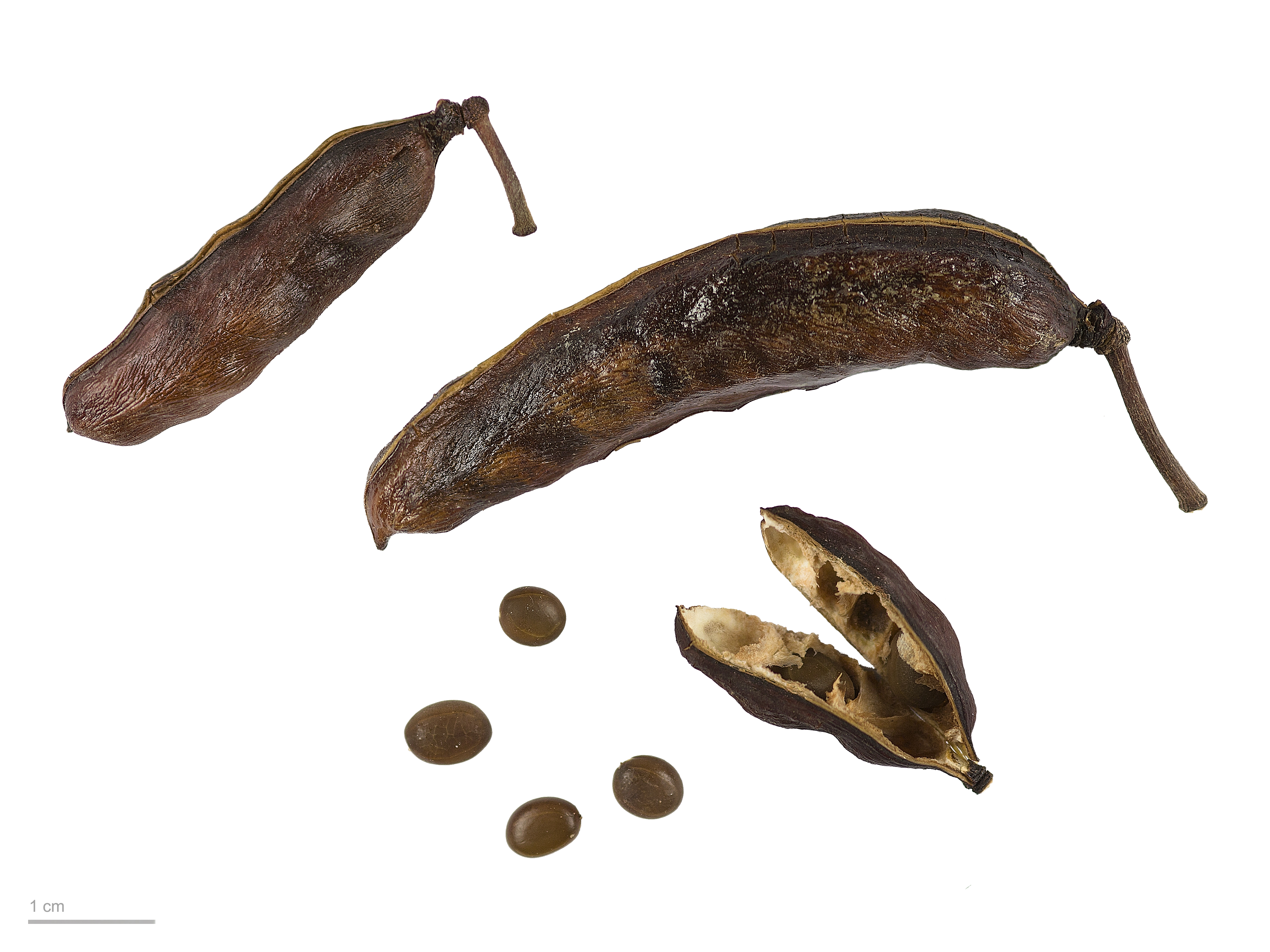

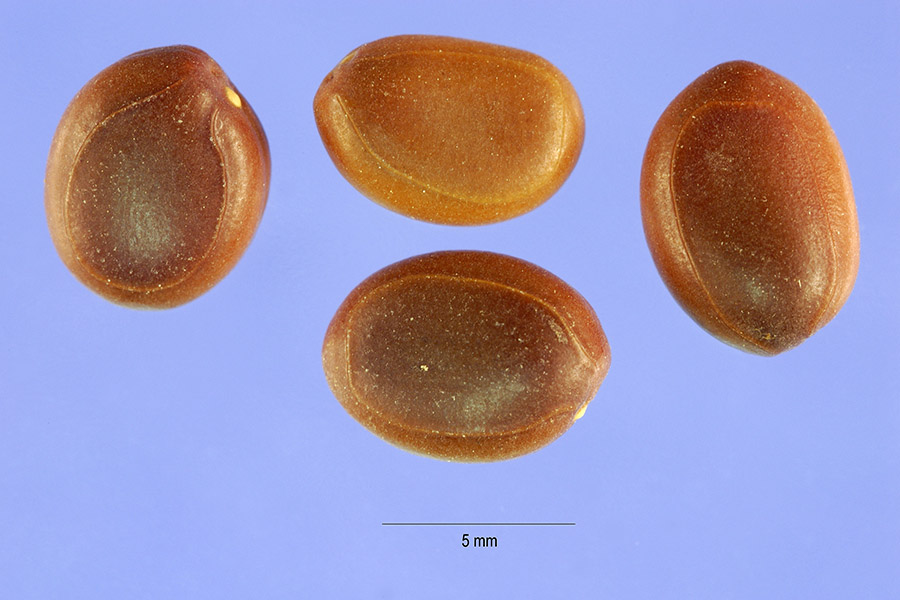
Seeds
