= Bliesbruck Baths =

Roman thermal complex in France

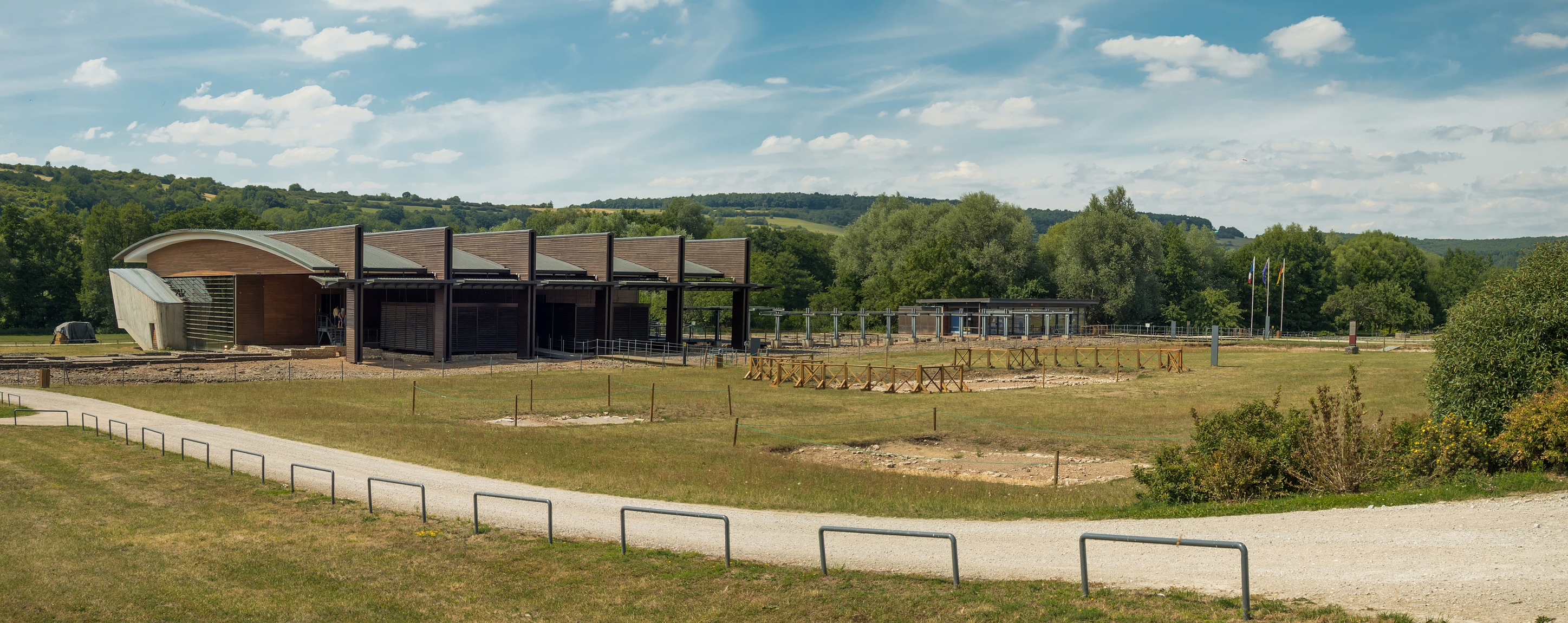
- Thermal baths, southeast facade.

- 49°07′31″N 7°10′55″E
- Type: Thermae
- Location: Bliesbruck, Moselle, France
- Region: Grand Est

History
- Built: Late 1st century
- Classified as MH (1986) and recorded as MH (1995)

The Bliesbruck baths, discovered in the commune of the same name in the French department of Moselle, in the Grand Est region, are a Roman thermal complex that was in operation from the late 1st century to the mid-3rd century.

The complex underwent renovations after about a century to enlarge the spaces and adapt them to new uses. Further modifications occurred in the 3rd century, seriously damaging the vicus. During late antiquity, the building was stripped of its most valuable materials. However, it was partially used towards the end of the Middle Ages or the beginning of the Renaissance when a fortified house was installed on its site. The ruins gradually deteriorated in the following centuries.

Archaeological excavations at the Bliesbruck site began in the 1970s, and the Moselle department acquired part of the site in 1982 to conduct extensive excavations. The bath elements were uncovered between 1987 and 1993 and are now part of the European Archaeological Park of Bliesbruck-Reinheim, housed in a museum pavilion designed to preserve the remains.

== Location ==
Map of the various elements of the Bliesbruck-Reinheim archaeological site.

The thermal complex is in Bliesbruck, a locality named after the nearby river, the Blies. The area is located on both sides of a Roman road that defines the architectural layout. (Note: Dusseaux 2013, p. 101) The baths are located close to the river.

Currently, the site is 10 km from Sarreguemines, 75 km east of Metz, and 15 km from Saarbrücken (Note: Petit 2015, p. 176) and it is dominated by the Homerich hill.

== History ==
=== History of the vicus ===
Map of the various neighborhoods in the vicus of the European Archaeological Park of Bliesbruck-Reinheim.

The Bliesbruck-Reinheim was occupied as early as the protohistoric period and gained significance in the 5th century BC with a princely Celtic character.

The vicus reached its peak in the 3rd century, situated near a large villa with an axial plan. Two artisanal quarters have been identified: the western quarter had an artisanal focus. In the eastern quarter, archaeologists have discovered several food cooking installations and a 750 m^{2} structure possibly used for the "meeting of a professional or religious association." (Note: Petit 2015, p. 178)

The urban settlement lost its urban character after the devastations of the crisis of the Third Century, leading to the abandonment of most buildings. This decline continued until the middle of the 5th century. The site was later occupied during the Middle Ages, with a Merovingian necropolis and a fortified house established in the baths in the 15th and 16th centuries. The Roman ruins eventually disappeared in the 17th and 18th centuries. (Note: Petit 2015, p. 177)

=== History of the thermal complex ===
==== Antiquity ====
Archaeologists have been able to determine the various phases of the building's history. Despite the changes, the thermal complex has maintained its "original plan."

===== Phase 1: End of the 1st century =====
Overall plan at the end of the 1st century.

The construction of the original complex dates back to the late 1st century or early 2nd century, (Note: Petit 2015, p. 179) representing a significant milestone in the urban development of this secondary settlement. It replaced an area that was previously occupied by earth and wood structures. Situated alongside a public square, the complex runs parallel to the main street.

Excavators have discovered lime pits dating back to the construction period, as well as areas where stones were cut for the construction. The pit found in the courtyard had wooden walls and a bottom.

The complex, measuring 11 m by 22 m, consists of three rooms arranged on an east-west axis: frigidarium, tepidarium, and caldarium. The last two rooms are equipped with an underfloor heating system. Preceding these rooms to the east is a small reception area. The frigidarium, ending in an apse, features a brick basin filled with cold water. The caldarium, also with an apse, contains a basin filled with hot water. The rectangular tepidarium follows a design typical in Campania, particularly in Pompeii, with the bathtub positioned on the north wall next to the hearth, and a sprinkling basin on the same wall.

Each wing measures approximately 4.9 m by 30 m. Along the east and south sides, there is a row of seven shops located next to the palestra, which is supported by a portico with wooden pillars. Cooking hearths have been found on the premises.

A 6 m by 9.20 m basin is situated in the center of a courtyard to the north, with three recognized access points. The courtyard, measuring 20 m on each side, is not suitable for sports activities but serves as a "relaxation area" adjacent to the basin. The basin is constructed of small stones covered with red plaster.

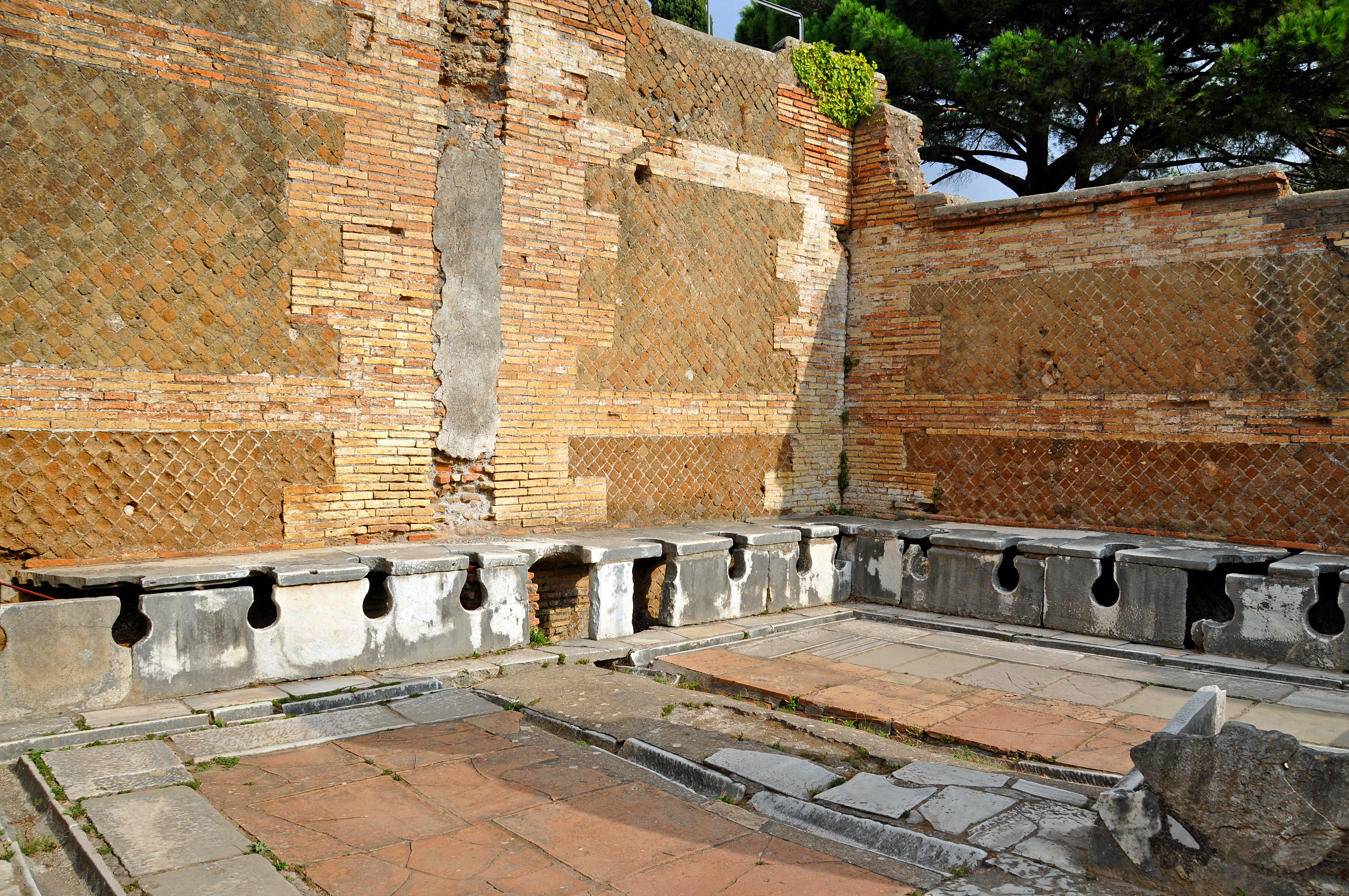
View of the latrines in the Ostia forum (illustration).

In the 2nd century, minor modifications were made, including the addition of latrines to the south of the central complex, supplied during the emptying of the frigidarium and by another drainage channel. These latrines, accessible from the street, can accommodate approximately 12 people. An 8.50 m long, 0.60 m wide, and 0.70 m deep canal is topped by a wooden bench for seating. Additionally, there is a channel for rinsing sponges and a washbasin for users.

===== Phase 2: Late 2nd century =====
Overall layout in the second half of the 2nd century.

In the last third or last quarter of the 2nd century, the complex underwent significant transformations and reached its peak.

The small entrance building was replaced by a larger structure, the caldarium was reconstructed, and the palaestra pool was filled in. The north wing was altered, connecting the building at the northernmost part to the complex, and the southeast wing was completely rebuilt. The north wing premises were adjusted, integrating the workshop-boutique building into the thermal complex, and the portico was also modified. The southern wing was demolished and rebuilt with columns and thicker masonry, indicating the possibility of an upper floor. The portico now has a width of approximately 3.50 meters.

The pool was filled in by the end of the 2nd century, possibly due to the high operating costs of a facility that was underused due to local temperatures. The palaestra, now abandoned and repurposed, contains a heated room in its southeast corner, measuring 8.30 meters by 5.30 meters, accessible from the central complex. Geophysical surveys conducted on the palaestra have uncovered either a nymphaeum or a temple. Nearby, a ronde-bosse sculpture of a child, viewed from behind while holding an object, was discovered. The area remains open to the public.

===== Phase 3: Mid-3rd century =====
Overall layout in the mid-third century.

In around 275 AD, the thermal complex underwent its final phase of expansion. The building's dimensions were then either 92 meters by 35 meters or 90 meters by 40 meters.

The addition of two large heated rooms on each side of the central door to the east of the reception room brought a significant change to the building's appearance. These rooms are believed to be changing rooms and were constructed in the early 3rd century. The expansion in surfaces and the addition of heated rooms suggest "a gradual transformation in the establishment's nature."

The north wing underwent additional modifications, with the portico being replaced by a closed gallery. In the southern wing, the first two shops adjacent to the central complex were replaced by a larger room that extends into the portico. The room to the north of the central complex now features a hypocaust and a heating room that extends further into the courtyard. The small building situated on the former palaestra was demolished, transforming the area into a service space with paved paths and a latrine exclusively designated for personnel.

By the end of the century, the building was affected by the barbarian invasions that plagued the Roman Empire. The destruction caused during this period dealt a fatal blow to the bathing function of the complex.

===== Late Antiquity =====
Overall plan in the 4th century.

After the damages of the late 3rd century, a portion of the building was restored but no longer used for bathing; the rooms were gradually left unheated. Lightweight structures were erected along the road in the first half of the 4th century. (Note: Petit 2015, pp. 179–181)

In the 4th century, a bronze workshop was established in the southeastern part of the complex, and the shops located to the south were repurposed. The frigidarium was also repurposed.

==== Post-Antiquity ====
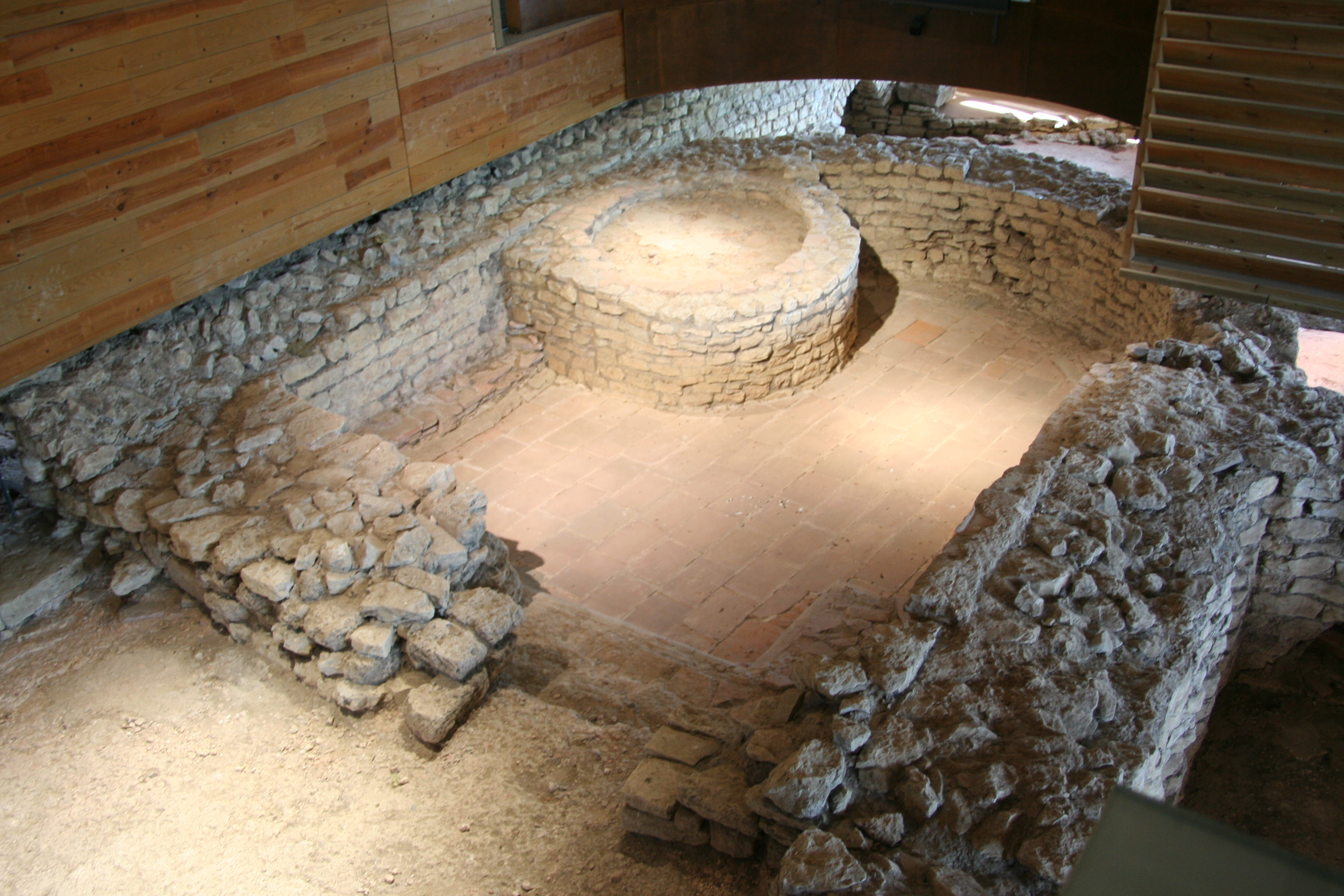
View of the remains of the frigidarium with those of the 16th-century oven, built at the level of the basin in room.

During the Middle Ages, a section of the frigidarium floor was repurposed and transformed into the main room. The walls from that era still measure 40 cm in thickness. A 1.8-meter passage was created to connect to the adjacent room, while the access route to the tepidarium was sealed off. To the south, the previous heated room was also repurposed. Materials, particularly lead, were salvaged, with individuals even dismantling walls to retrieve the pipes, leaving behind traces in the frigidarium's mortar.

Overall layout in the 15th and 16th centuries.

In the 13th century, the village belonged to the Luxembourgish family of Raville after Dietrich de Varsberg married Lore de Brücken. The family then settled in the castle known as Altes Schloss. The final phase of occupation of the frigidarium was reconstructed based on walls that were 1 meter in height.

The thermal complex, particularly the frigidarium, measuring 8 meters by 4.5 meters, underwent renovations during the 15th and 16th centuries when the Raville family still owned the village. (Note: Clemens & Petit 1995, pp. 65–67 and 74) The Gallo-Roman walls were restored, and according to 16th-century sources, (Note: Petit 2015, p. 181) a small fortified house was constructed on the ruins of the baths.

== Sources, archaeological excavations, and site enhancement ==
=== Sources ===
A report dated 1500 mentions the baths.

=== Archaeological excavations ===
The secondary Roman settlement was excavated starting in 1979. Further excavations were conducted between 1987 and 1990, revealing a substantial thermal complex at the site.

The material uncovered during the excavations was meticulously documented. (Note: Petit 2015, p. 185) The site revealed artifacts from the medieval period found in the frigidarium, including pottery sherds, (Note: Clemens & Petit 1995, pp. 72 and 76) fragments of horseshoes, iron objects, and a few silver coins.

Coins from the late 3rd century BC have been unearthed during the excavations. Additionally, a variety of decorative elements, including rings, beads, hairpins, and fibulae, were discovered, most of which belonged to women. The different types of fibulae found make it challenging to attribute them to a specific group of people. Remnants of kitchen utensils and bones associated with food processing were found in the shops. (Note: Petit 2015, pp. 185–188) Various items related to textile craftsmanship were also uncovered in the baths, although it is difficult to make precise conclusions about on-site activities. (Note: Petit 2015, p. 188) Elements related to trade, such as styluses, were also revealed during the excavations. (Note: Petit 2015, p. 190)

The excavations uncovered fragmentary sculptures, described as "fragments of divine effigies in stone." Among them was a stele portraying a Genius, which was unfortunately incomplete. The Genius was believed to be depicted holding a cornucopia in one hand and a patella in the other. These fragments were discovered and reused in masonry structures dating back to the 16th century. (Note: Petit 2015, p. 191) Additionally, fragments of Genii or Fortuna were found in the infill of the palaestra, along with fragments of terracotta statuettes.

=== Evocation and heritage enhancement ===
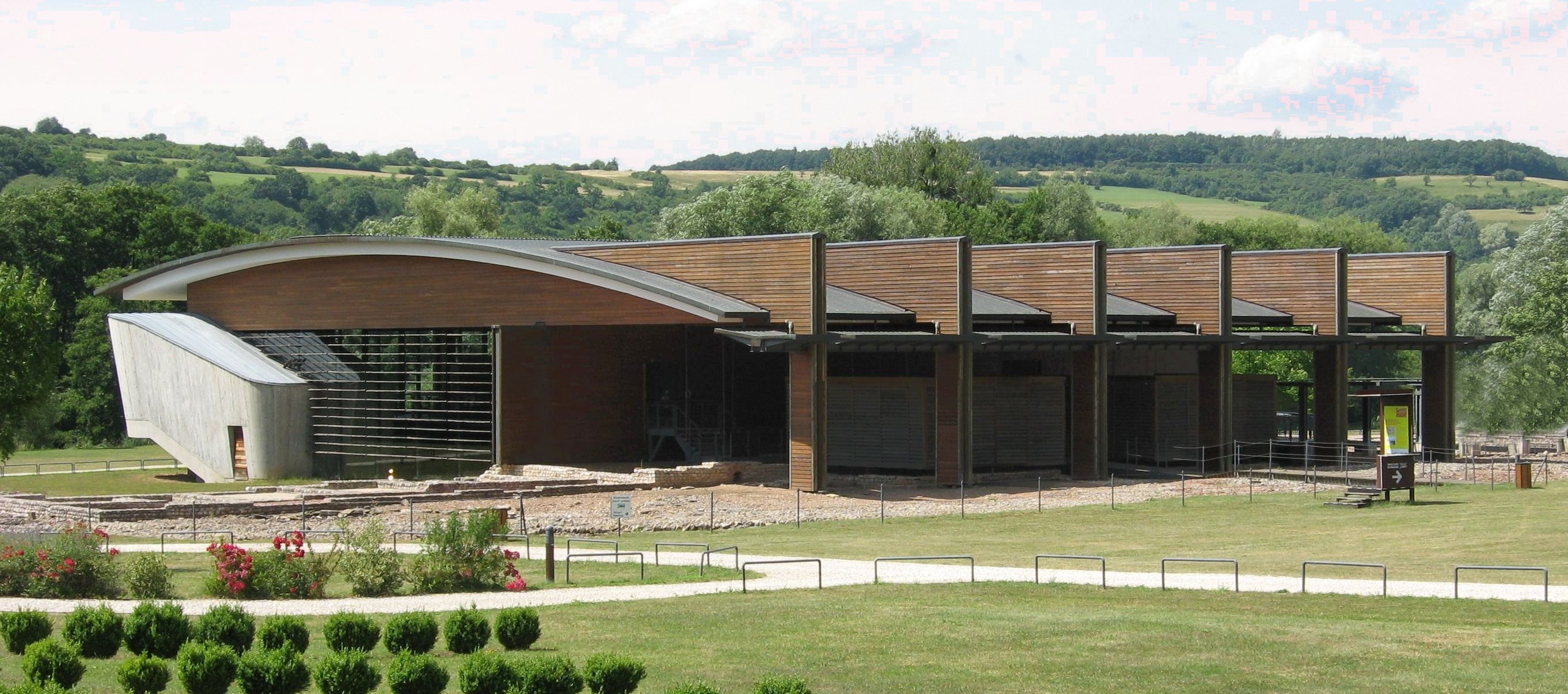
The museum pavilion housing the remains of the thermal baths.

Significant educational work has been conducted, enabling the reconstruction of the building's state at various points in its history.

The protection of the remains was planned from the beginning of the excavation, using temporary cover systems. (Note: Dusseaux 2013, p. 100) Since 1993, the remains of the Bliesbruck baths have been safeguarded by a museum pavilion. The museum space for the baths has been intentionally minimized to "maintain the emotional impact of the authentic excavated ruins." The remains have been stabilized, and the pavilion features an "umbrella architecture" with walkways that enable visitors to explore the site.

== Description and operation of the complex ==
The monumental thermal complex is a testament to the significance of this primarily artisanal settlement. It is constructed on a north-south axis and spans 75 meters in length by 35 meters in width. The construction is part of a "global urban development plan for the settlement," with a 3.50-meter-wide paved street running along its southern part.

The state of the building from the mid-3rd century is well-documented. At that time, the complex was the largest, but it had lost some of its regularity due to the service rooms on the facade.

=== Construction method and decoration ===
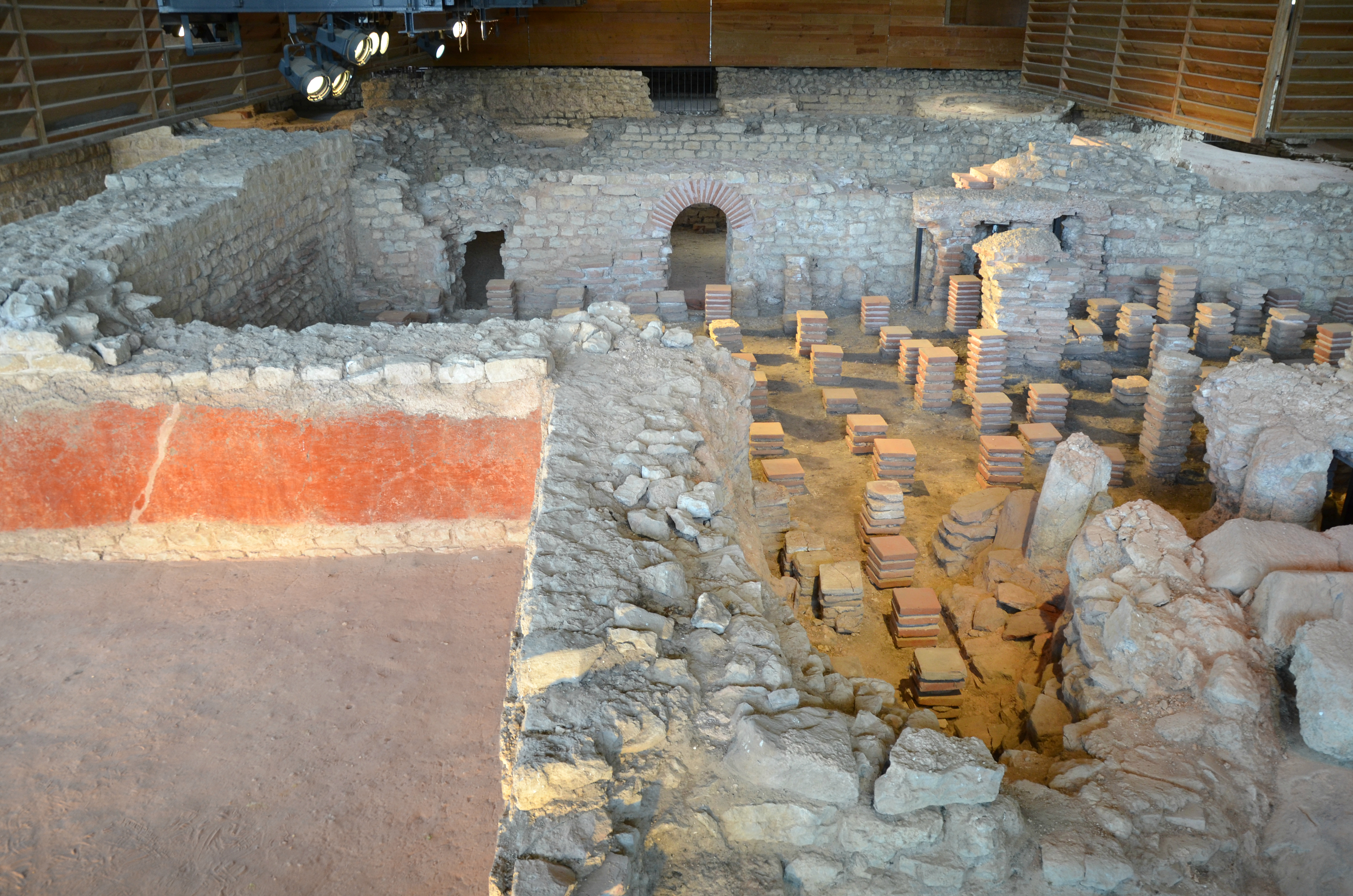
View of the caldarium with its suspended floor and of the exterior wall with the tile plaster.

The builders used the Roman foot and multiples of the pace, indicating that a regular plan guided its construction.

The building decoration is not well understood. Fragments of limestone plates have been found, but their original location is unknown. Similarly, little is known about the painted decorations that were once present. Archaeologists have discovered interior decor elements on a white background with colored bands and plant motifs, as well as garlands from the initial phase of the building's history. In the final phase, only a few elements from the tepidarium with a decoration of red and black bands on a white background are known.

During the refurbishment phase, a pink stucco plaster was applied to the exterior walls. Excavators uncovered fragments of glass.

=== Espace thermal stricto sensu ===
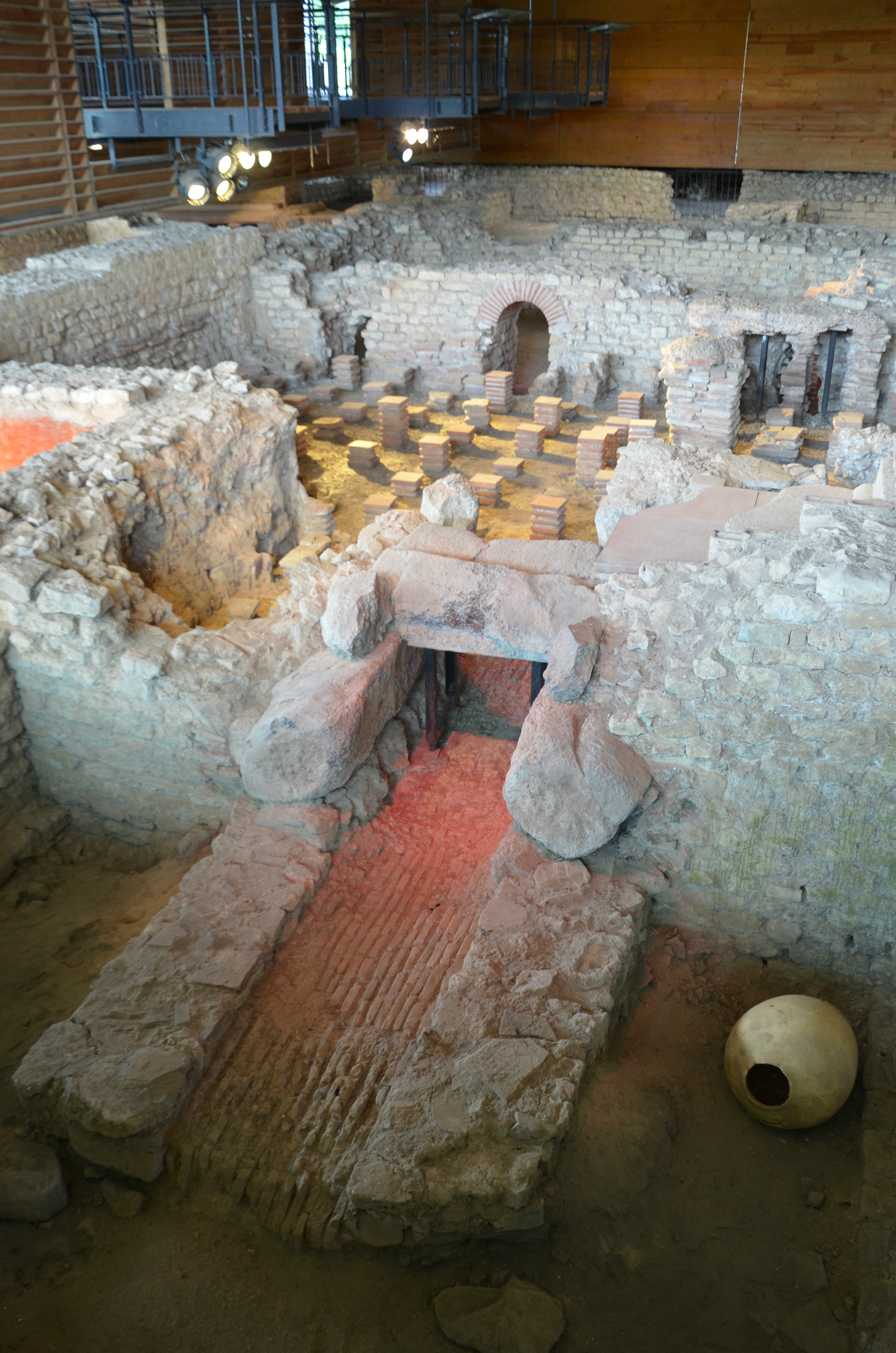
Another view of the caldarium.

The baths adhere to a specific ritual, "centered on the contrast of heat and cold," reflected in the architectural design. The building layout is linear, reminiscent of a style found in Pompeii, with the monumental effect enhanced by two wings of shops that provide symmetry. However, the classic circuit is disrupted by the arrangement of various spaces due to expansion works.

In addition to the bathing area, thermal buildings could have spaces for physical exercise or leisure activities.

The reception area was renovated to increase its capacity by adding a room. In the 3rd century, two heated changing rooms were installed, which reduced one entrance. They are furnished with simple painted plaster.

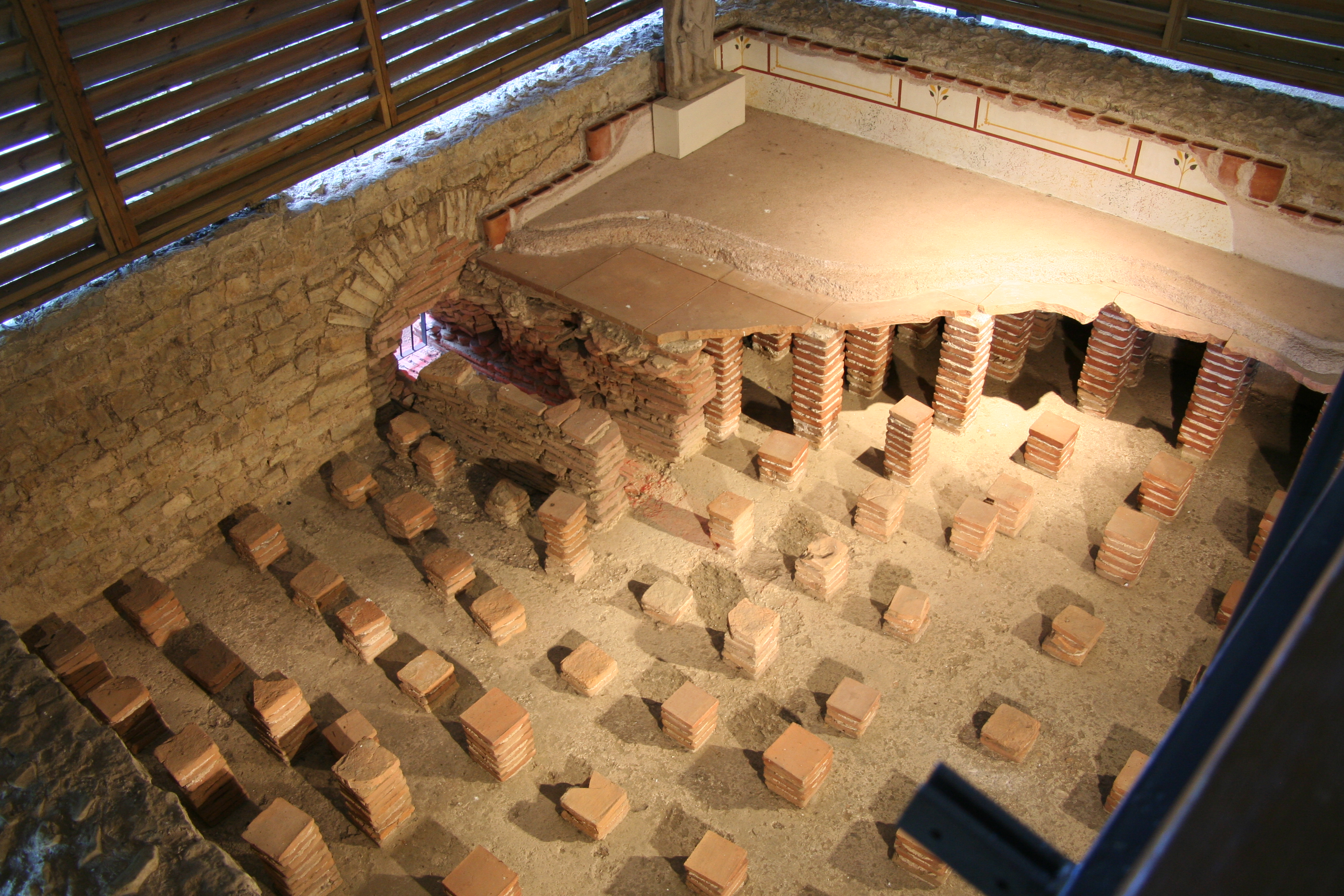
View of one of the heated rooms, with part of the floor restored.

The "bathing" area, consisting of the frigidarium, tepidarium, and caldarium, measures 22 meters by 11 meters. It is accompanied by another heated room measuring 8.5 meters by 7.5 meters. A praefurnium, with a gabbro hearth, supplies heat to the tepidarium and caldarium through a heating duct. The three rooms originally had barrel vaults made of tufa or concrete, with vault heights ranging from 4.50 meters to 7 meters. In the final phase of the building, a large room was added to the north, featuring a vaulted system. However, the building lacks a dry sweating room, a sudatorium, where bathers can sweat.

The frigidarium measures 10 meters by 4 meters with walls 90 cm thick made of bricks with lime plaster. The cold water basin is only 5 meters long. The floor is made of lime concrete, and the room has a barrel vault. Initially, the bathtub is located in the apse and is equipped with terracotta paving before being enlarged to 15 square meters. The drainage system is located in the apse and connects to the latrines. There is a staircase to the north of the room, close to the basin drainage system, providing access to the tepidarium. The room east of the frigidarium is the access area to the baths and leads to two heated rooms.

The tepidarium measures 6.9 meters by 3.8 meters and is smaller than the other rooms. Its size accommodates chimney outlets and a rainwater drainage system. The room is furnished with wooden furniture and features a hypocaust heating system connected to the caldarium through a wall. The heating system may have experienced operational challenges. The lower part of the room is made of lime concrete.

The caldarium has been expanded, and a bathtub has been installed in the southern exedra. It is the hottest room, reaching a temperature of around 40 degrees Celsius. The room features a suspended floor with tubes running along the walls. Decorated with frescoes and marble, the exterior wall is coated with pink mortar plaster to ensure waterproofing.

An 11.5-meter by 9.6-meter space located north of the "bathing" area provides access to another heating room. This room may have served as a space for physical exercises, oil anointing, or other care activities, as archaeologists have uncovered a variety of utensils used for these purposes.

Latrines have been installed, along with boutiques along the palaestra.

=== Boutiques ===
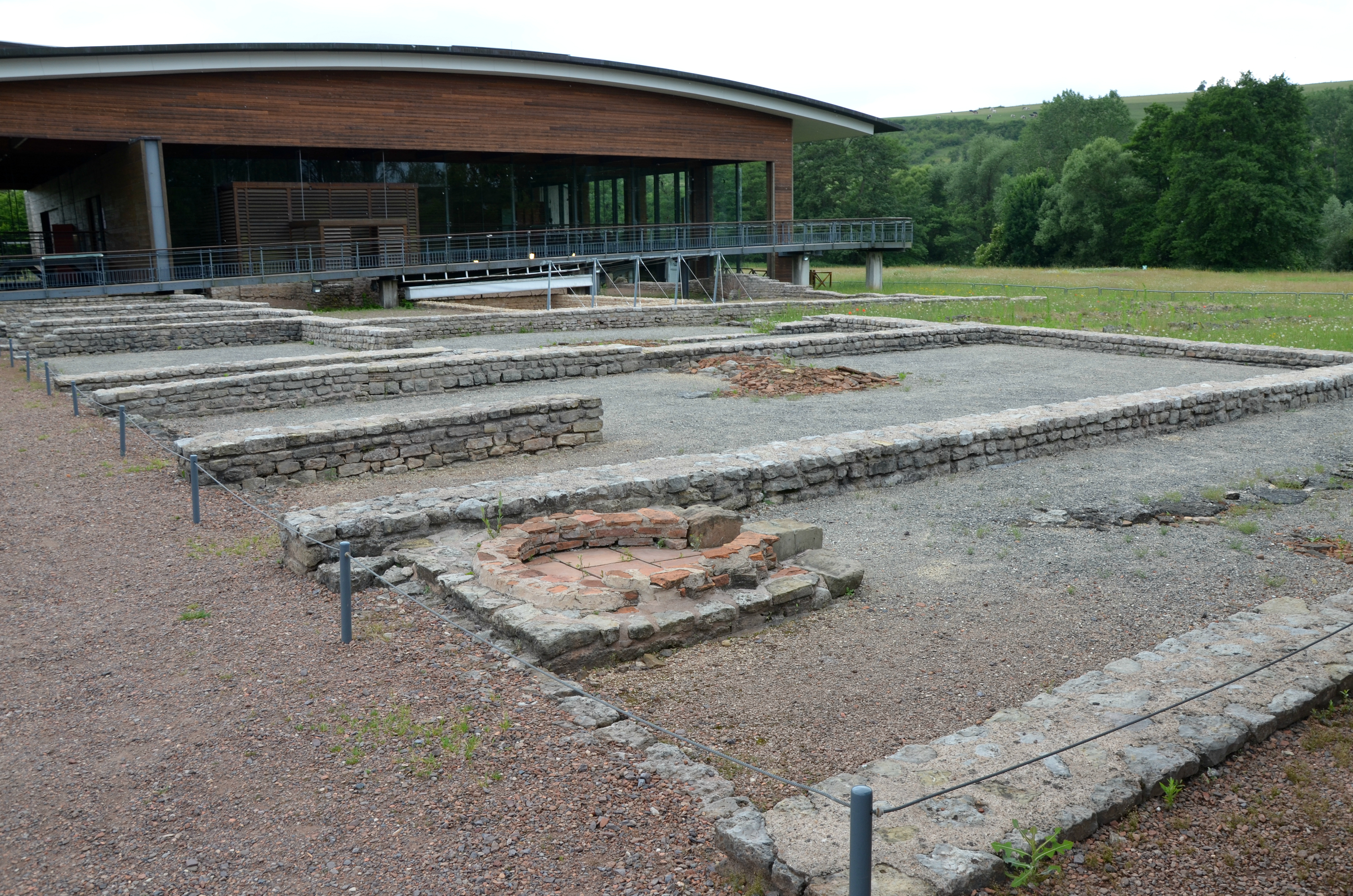
Ruins of stores with the pavilion housing the remains of the thermal baths in the background.

In both the north and south wings of the baths, there are boutiques following a pattern seen in other archaeological sites around the Mediterranean Basin. These boutiques are designed for artisanal or commercial purposes, serving as taverns and providing a barrier from street disturbances for users of the palaestra. Additionally, a building extends from the north wing, also designated for artisanal and commercial activities.

The boutiques are lined with a portico and initially have the same dimensions, measuring approximately 4.90 meters by 2.80 meters each. The total area of the boutiques is about 15 square meters, which is shared. The portico is constructed with wooden pillars supported by stone bases.

The palaestra is located behind the north wing of the boutiques. Adjacent to it is a spacious building measuring approximately 15 meters by 11 meters, which also accommodated boutiques and workshops.

The boutiques were renovated in the late 2nd century. The south wing now consists of six boutiques covering an area of approximately 26 meters by 5.80 meters. The floor is made of clay court or gravel, and the base of a staircase has been partially preserved. The boutiques have removable wooden panels for opening and closing, similar to those found in excavations of Pompeii and Herculaneum, where molds of such installations have been preserved. There is also a service door, and the boutiques have an upper floor.

The interior equipment of the boutiques was likely made of wood. Excavations have revealed "combustion structures," hearths, and ovens, probably used for meal preparation. The north wing yielded culinary utensils and tables. Spoons and a wine strainer were discovered, along with lead labels for imported products. Styluses were also among the findings.

=== Operation ===
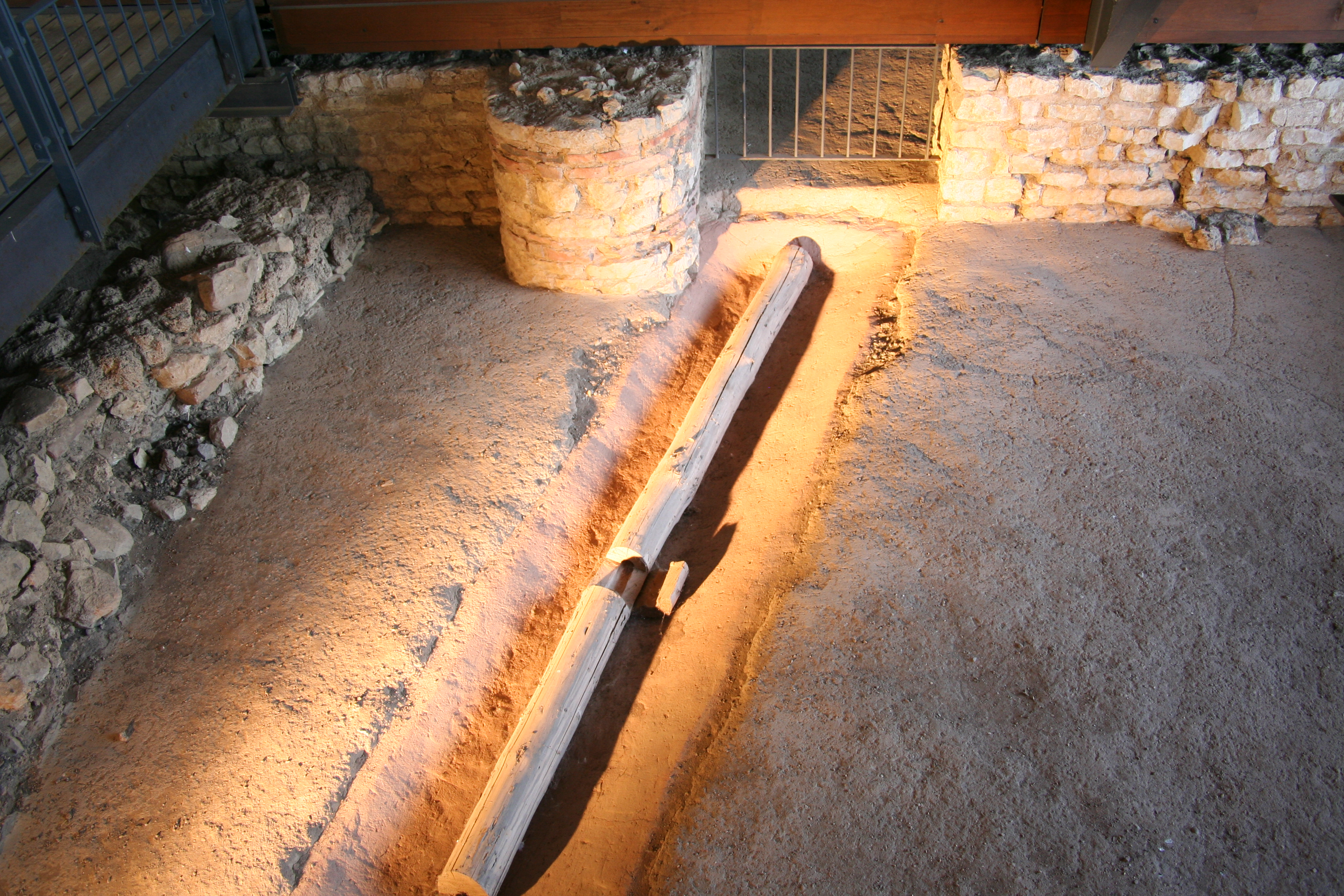
View of the room ruins with restored wooden pipes.

Thermal establishments necessitate "expertise in advanced construction techniques, heating, and water distribution." They are also expensive to operate, demanding "continuous maintenance and frequent repairs." The baths' main facility has been operational for 180 years.

Water is abundant, as evidenced by the presence of a large basin and a nymphaeum. Archaeologists have discovered remnants of wooden pipes. The latrine canal is kept clean by the flow of rainwater and the drainage system of the frigidarium.

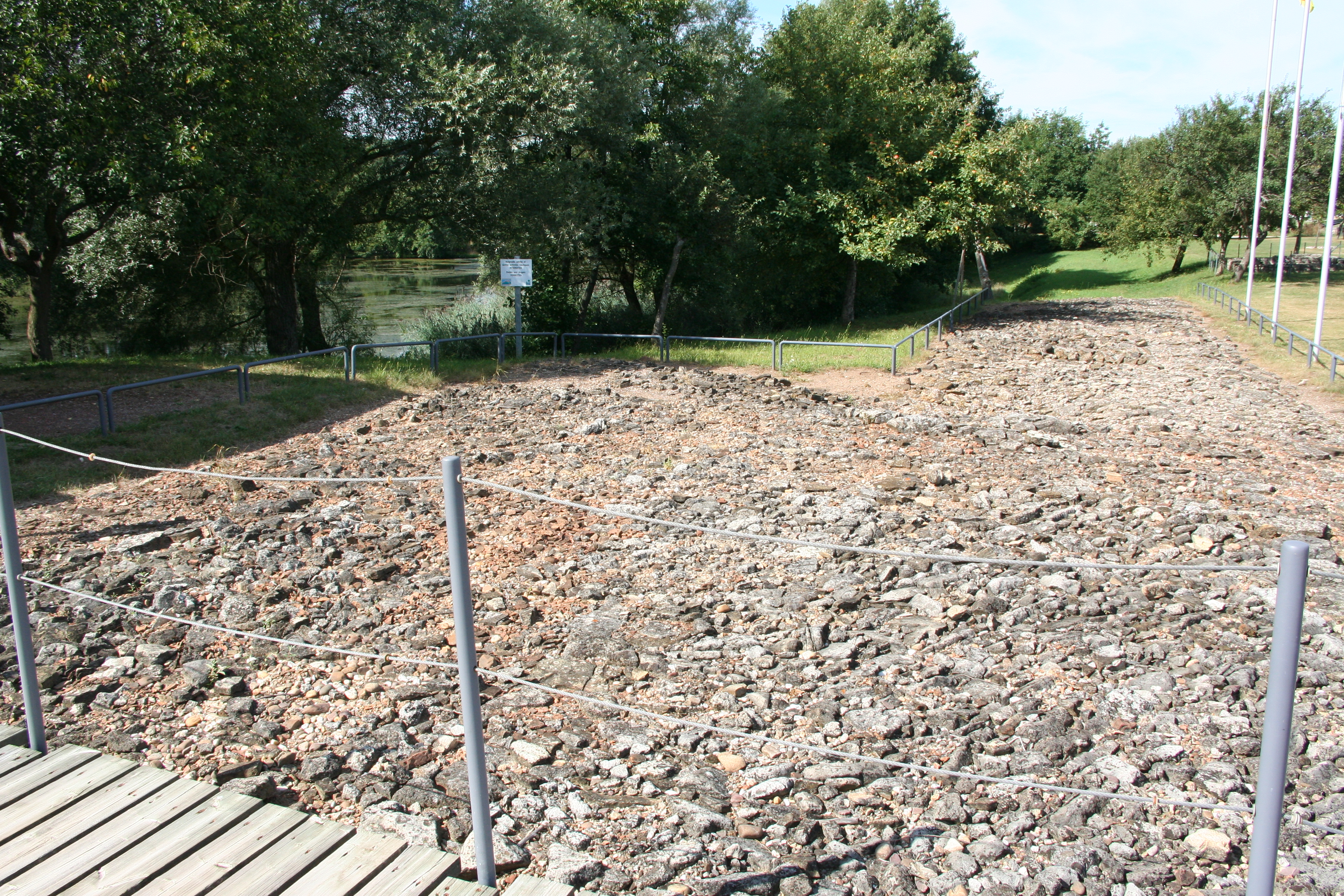
View of a stone path in the archaeological park, with the river in the background.

The heating system in place enables the warming of both the warm and hot rooms, as well as heating the water for the hot room basin. A boiler is connected to the various rooms through a heating duct. The heating chamber, situated outside, contains the hearth. During reconstruction, the hearth was relocated to enhance its effectiveness. The boiler, typically constructed of bronze or lead, has two reservoirs above a masonry mass where cold water is stored to regulate temperatures. The remaining rooms are heated by a built-in hearth within the wall.

The rear of the thermal complex is used for pathways, a well, and gutters.

In small towns, baths were not used simultaneously by men and women due to the lack of independent spaces, unlike larger thermal complexes. Afternoon time slots may have been reserved for men. The water is renewed in the morning, making it cleaner at that time of day, but access is more expensive.

== Interpretation ==
=== Monumental element of the vicus ===
The Bliesbruck baths are significant and comparable to others in the northwest of the Roman Empire. Successive expansions of the construction increased the area dedicated to bathing activities and reception.

In the 3rd century, the thermal complex was the most well-known (Note: Petit 2015, p. 184) and occupied an "urban front" of approximately 100 meters. The square also features three other public buildings and is integrated into an urban fabric of "row houses." One side of the square is taken up by a basilica with three naves measuring 31.20 meters by 15.60 meters. This building is designed for commercial or social activities rather than political or administrative purposes. The southern part of the square is occupied by boutiques. (Note: Petit 2015, pp. 181–182) In the center of the square, there used to be a monumental fountain with a hemicycle, (Note: Petit 2015, pp. 182–183) although only a few remnants of it remain. There are examples of the connection between baths and a monumental fountain, and at Bliesbruck, the fountain and baths together form a "water axis" in a "functional and visually appealing architectural layout at the heart of the settlement." (Note: Petit 2015, pp. 183–184) It is worth noting that the public center may have been larger in the 2nd century, a period that is less documented compared to the subsequent century. (Note: Petit 2015, pp. 184–185)

The baths of Bliesbruck are a key feature of "a complex with expanded social and economic functions," serving as the main building of the public center. While baths in other vici are also recognized, their significance within settlements is often overlooked, except at Bliesbruck where their "integration into the social and economic space is well understood."

=== Example of benefaction in a vicus ===
The construction cost was probably "a few hundred thousand sesterces," and the annual operating cost was "several thousand sesterces." These costs were not offset by revenues, which were probably modest due to the low entrance fees charged to users. However, at Bliesbruck, there were likely additional revenues from boutiques and certain extra services offered in the thermal complex.

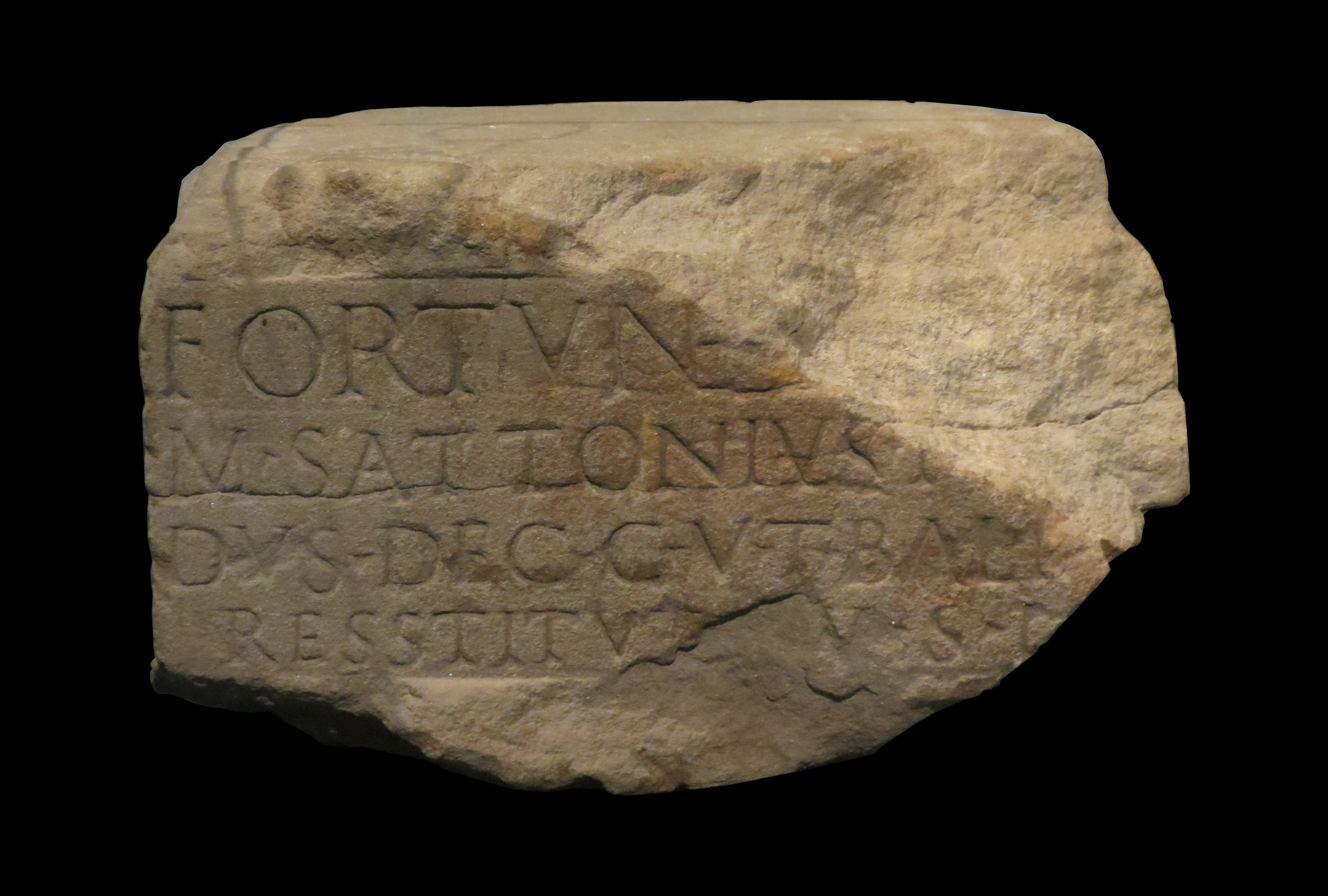
Fragmentary Latin inscription from Coriovallum, mentioning Marcus Sattoninus Iucundus, member of the College of Decurions.

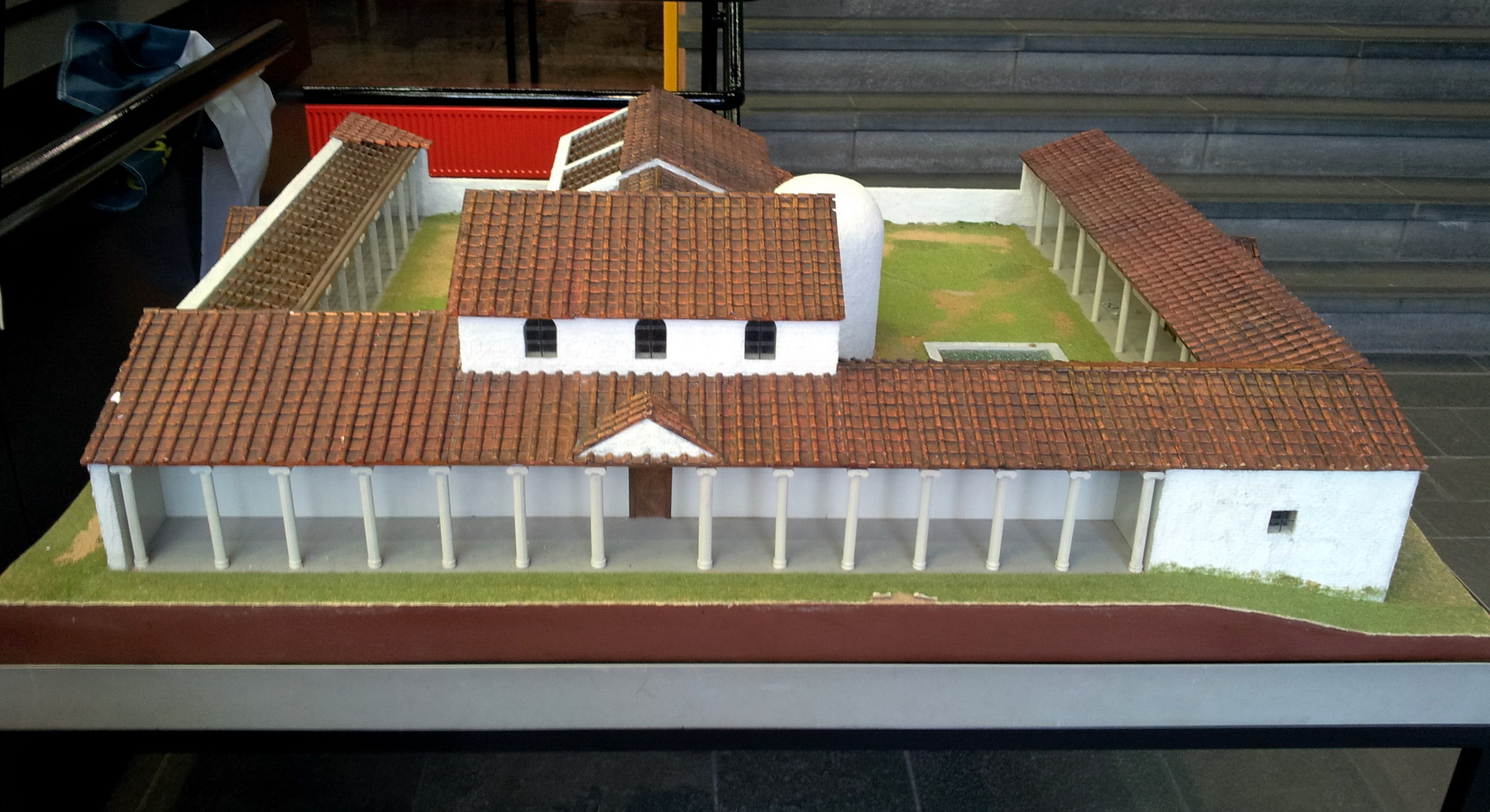
Model of the Heerlen thermal baths.

The thermal complex at Bliesbruck is probably a "public property," given its location in the public center of the vicus. The building's monumental nature suggests it may have been constructed through the euergetism of local notables, with its operation possibly supported by the system of liturgies. While no epigraphic evidence has been found on the site to confirm this, a discovery at an important thermal establishment in Heerlen, where a decurion restored the complex after making a vow to Fortuna, supports this hypothesis. Sculpted deity remains found in the baths may have served as decorative elements or symbols of patronage, with some possibly being dedicated. However, the limited elements at Bliesbruck make it challenging to draw definitive conclusions in this regard. (Note: Petit 2015, pp. 190–191)

Benefaction in Belgic Gaul, including among the Mediomatrici, is carried out by both local elites and communities, such as vici or pagi, organized under the authority of decurions. The baths of Bliesbruck were constructed either by a prominent individual or by the community, possibly with the involvement of "one or more local notables" who held official positions. The owner of the grand villa in Reinheim could have also played a significant role in such benefactions.

=== Testimony to Romanization ===
Thermal facilities in the Roman Empire were not just for hygiene but also served as "centers of well-being and leisure," as well as sociability. They played a significant role in these aspects.

The baths are part of the installations that demonstrate the rapid spread of the Roman lifestyle, not only in major cities but also in small settlements like the vicus of Bliesbruck.

The history of the thermal complex of Bliesbruck, with its various phases of expansion, testifies to the growing importance, over time, of heated non-bathing rooms. The social aspect takes precedence over the bathing aspect, with the baths becoming a favored otium space. Therefore, social activities, discussions, games, rest, and meals all take place.

== See also ==
- List of Roman public baths
- European Archaeological Park of Bliesbruck-Reinheim

== Bibliography ==
=== General works ===
- Collectif (2010). Pérégrinations dans l'Empire romain : De Bliesbrück-Reinheim à Rome, avec Jean-Claude Golvin, peintre de l'antiquité (in French). Arles: Actes sud / Conseil général de la Moselle. ISBN 978-2-7427-9287-0.
- Coulon, Gérard; Golvin, Jean-Claude (2002). Voyage en Gaule romaine (in French). Arles-Paris: Actes sud / Errance. ISBN 978-2-7427-3920-2.

=== General works on Bliesbruck ===
- Dusseaux, Diane (2013). Parc archéologique européen de Bliesbruck-Reinheim, guide de visite (in French). Saint-Étienne: IAC Editions d’Art. ISBN 978-2-916373-67-6.
- Antonelli, Sonia; Petit, Jean-Paul (2017). "L'agglomération de Bliesbruck (Moselle) durant l'Antiquité tardive : entre ruptures et continuités". Gallia (in French). 74 (74–1): 149–164. doi:10.4000/gallia.2428.
- Petit, Jean-Paul; Schaub, Jean; Brunella, Philippe (1995). Bliesbruck-Reinheim : parc archéologique européen (in French). Paris: Imprimerie nationale. ISBN 978-2-7433-0033-3.
- Petit, Jean-Paul; Brunella, Philippe (2005). Bliesbruck-Reinheim : Celtes et Gallo-Romains en Moselle et en Sarre. Hauts lieux de l'histoire (in French). Paris: Errance. ISBN 978-2-87772-298-8.
- Petit, Jean-Paul; Santoro-Bianchi, Sara (2007). De Pompéi à Bliesbruck-Reinheim : Vivre en Europe romaine (in French). Paris: Errance. OCLC 315850300.

=== Works on the thermal baths or the monumental center ===
- Clemens, Lukas; Petit, Jean-Paul (1995). "Un habitat de la fin du Moyen ge dans les thermes gallo-romains de Bliesbruck (Moselle)". Archéologie médiévale (in French). 25 (25): 65–85. doi:10.3406/arcme.1995.868.
- Deru, Xavier; Petit, Jean-Paul (2005). "Au cœur de la ville, des thermes publics". Bliesbruck-Reinheim - Celtes et Gallo-Romains en Moselle et en Sarre (in French). Errance. pp. 67–88. ISBN 9782877722988.
- Follain, Erik; Brunella, Philippe (2003). "Les thermes gallo-romains de Bliesbruck : de la recherche scientifique à l'évocation architecturale" (PDF). Les Cahiers Lorrains (in French) (1). Archived from the original (PDF) on 24 June 2021.
- Follain, Érik; Petit, Jean-Paul; Santoro, Sara (2017). "Le centre monumental romain restitué". Archéologia (in French) (552): 46–53.
- Petit, Jean-Paul (2000). Le Complexe des thermes de Bliesbruck (Moselle) : un quartier public au cœur d'une agglomération secondaire de la Gaule Belgique (in French). Paris: Exé productions.
- Petit, Jean-Paul (2007). "Les thermes publics de Bliesbruck". Les dossiers d'archéologie (in French) (323): 76–95.
- Petit, Jean-Paul (2015). "Les thermes publics de Bliesbruck (Moselle, France) : un complexe aux fonctions sociales et économiques au cœur d'une agglomération secondaire de la cité des Médiomatriques". Archaeologia Mosellana. Thermae in context, the roman bath in town and life (in French). 10: 175–193.
