= Praefurnium =

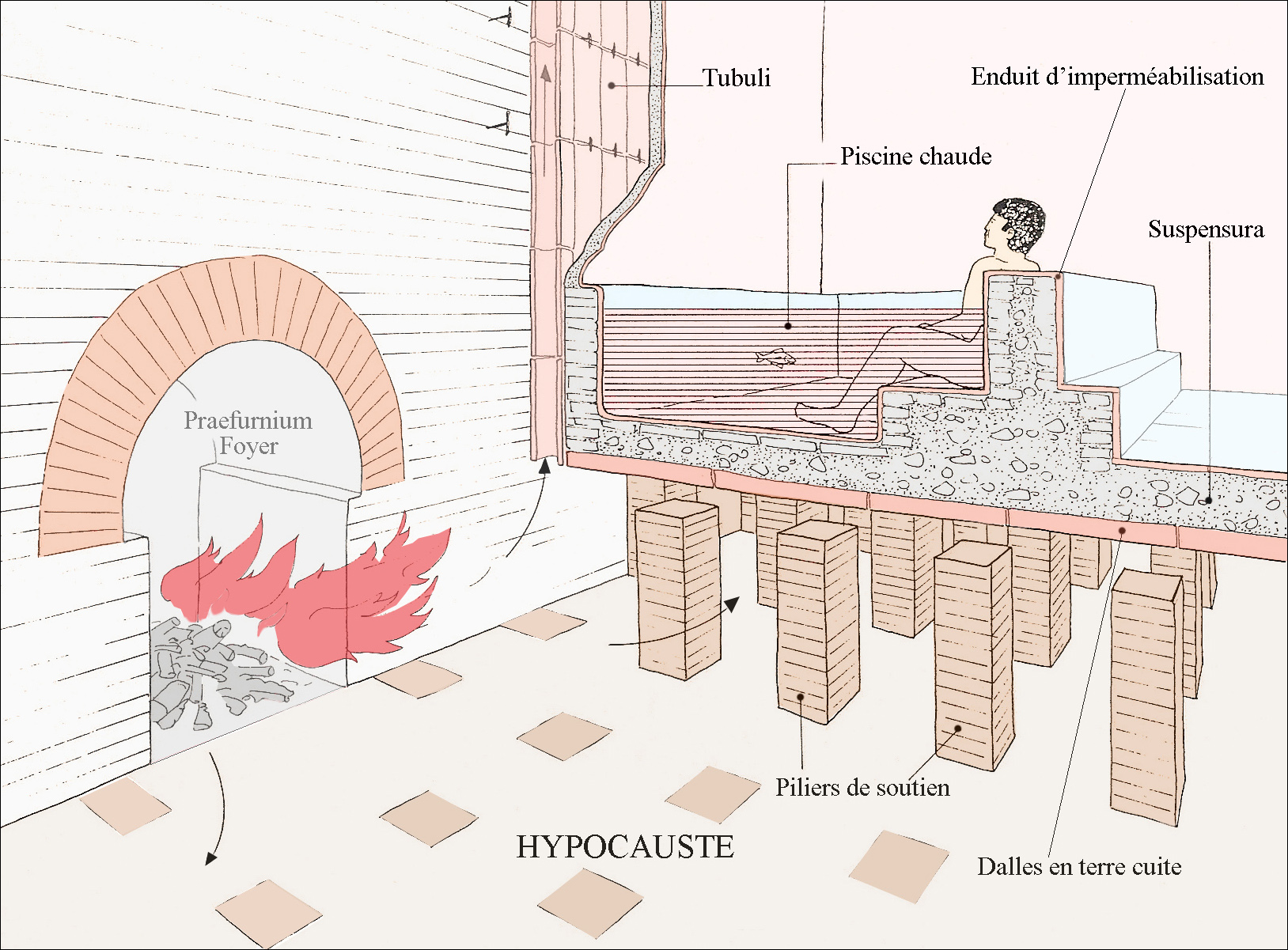
Diagram of the operation of a praefurnium and heat distribution through hypocaust and tubuli of a Roman bath

In Ancient Rome, the praefurnium designated the room and the furnace that ensured the heating of the hot or warm premises of the thermae.

== Description ==
The praefurnium contains the wood-fired furnaces of the Roman baths and is generally placed at a lower level of the premises to be heated, in order to facilitate the diffusion of heat. The water is heated in copper or bronze tanks above the furnace combustion chamber. There may be one single or several heating rooms, depending on the number of premises and baths to be heated.

A fire under the furnace arch provides warm air, conducted to the hypocaust, an underfloor heating system to distribute heat to the caldarium, the tepidarium, the laconicum and the sudatorium. Vitruvius describes this system and its operation in his work De architectura. The heating of the premises is also done by hot air distribution ducts called tubuli. These are elements of terracotta ducts of different shapes, allowing the circulation of hot air from the hypocaust to the upper parts of the thermal baths.

The heating room has an opening on the ignition and fuel reserve side, as well as for the supply of fresh air and another opening on the side of the hypocaust, for the exit of smoke and gas as well as hot air. The walls are made up of stone or brick and the ceiling is often vaulted. An adjoining room allowes the storage of fuel, wood or charcoal. This service room opens directly onto the outside, to facilitate fuel supply.

== See also ==
- Ancient Roman bathing
