= 1st-century Roman domes =

Roman architectural feature

While there are earlier examples in the Republican period and early Imperial period, the growth of domed construction increased under Emperor Nero and the Flavians in the 1st century AD, and during the 2nd century. Centrally planned halls become increasingly important parts of palace and palace villa layouts beginning in the 1st century, serving as state banqueting halls, audience rooms, or throne rooms. Formwork was arranged either horizontally or radially, but there is not enough surviving evidence from the 1st and 2nd centuries to say what was typical.

== Nero ==
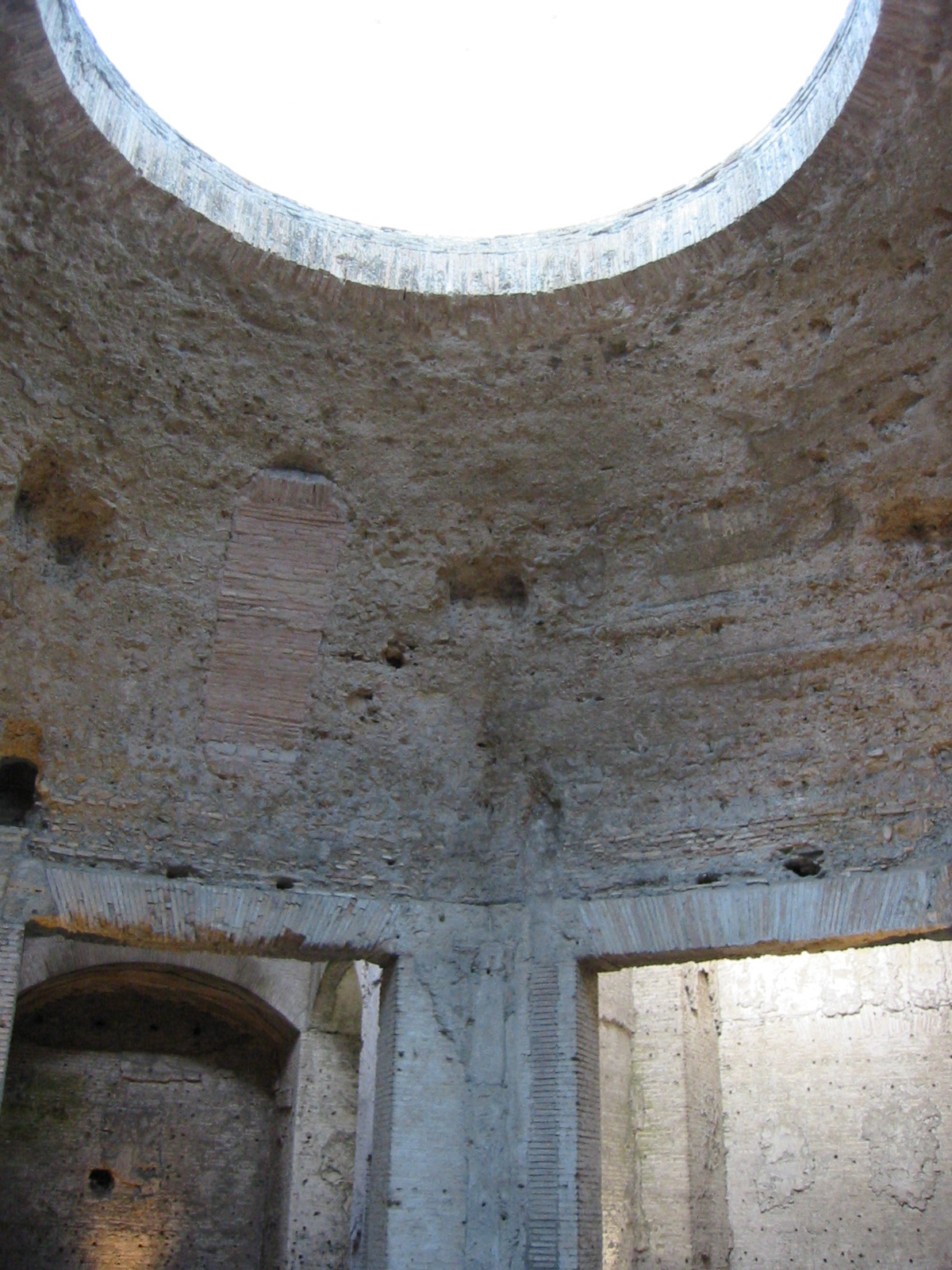
The octagonal domed hall found in Nero's Domus Aurea

The opulent palace architecture of the Emperor Nero (54 – 68 AD) marks an important development. There is evidence of a dome in his Domus Transitoria at the intersection of two corridors, resting on four large piers, which may have had an oculus at the center. In Nero's Domus Aurea, or "Golden House", planned by Severus and Celer, the walls of a large octagonal room transition to an octagonal domical vault, which then transitions to a dome with an oculus. This is the earliest known example of a dome in the city of Rome itself.

The Domus Aurea was built after 64 AD and the dome was over 13 meters (43 ft) in diameter. The exterior diameter of the octagonal room was 14.65 meters (48.1 ft) meters and the diameter of the oculus was 5.925.92 meters (19.4 ft) meters. The height of the dome (4.79 meters (15.7 ft)) was about equal to the height of the supporting walls (4.91 meters (16.1 ft)). The dome transitions from an octagonal plan to a circular plan at about 2 meters (6 ft 7 in) above its springing. This octagonal and semicircular dome is made of concrete and the oculus is made of brick. The radial walls of the surrounding rooms buttress the dome, allowing the octagonal walls directly beneath it to contain large openings under flat arches and for the room itself to be unusually well lit. Because there is no indication that mosaic or other facing material had ever been applied to the surface of the dome, it may have been hidden behind a tent-like fabric canopy like the pavilion tents of Hellenistic (and earlier Persian) rulers. The oculus is unusually large, more than two-fifths the span of the room, and it may have served to support a lightweight lantern structure or tholos, which would have covered the opening. Circular channels on the upper surface of the oculus also support the idea that this lantern, perhaps itself domed, was the rotating dome referred to in written accounts. A rainwater drainage manhole in the floor at the center of the room, beneath the open oculus, has since been covered.

According to Suetonius, the Domus Aurea had a dome that perpetually rotated on its base in imitation of the sky. It was reported in 2009 that newly discovered foundations of a round room may be those of a rotating domed dining hall. Also reported in contemporary sources is a ceiling over a dining hall in the palace fitted with pipes so that perfume could rain from the ceiling, although it is not known whether this was a feature of the same dome. The expensive and lavish decoration of the palace caused such scandal that it was abandoned soon after Nero's death and public buildings such as the Baths of Titus and the Colosseum were built at the site.

== Domitian ==
The only intact dome from the reign of Emperor Domitian is a 16.1-meter (53 ft) wide example in what may have been a nymphaeum at his villa at Albano. It is now the church of Santa Maria della Rotunda.

Domitian's 92 AD Domus Augustana established the apsidal semi-dome as an imperial motif. Square chambers in his palace on the Palatine Hill used pendentives to support domes. His palace contained three domes resting over walls with alternating apses and rectangular openings. Twin octagonal halls covered with cloister vaults were made by Rabirius. An octagonal domed hall existed in the domestic wing. Unlike Nero's similar octagonal dome, its segments extended all the way to the oculus. The dining hall of this private palace, called the Coenatio Jovis, or Dining Hall of Jupiter, contained a rotating ceiling like the one Nero had built, but with stars set into the simulated sky.

The so-called "Baths of Nero" at Pisa included an octagonal cloister vault over the small sudatio, or hot room, with a central oculus surrounded by eight rectangular openings in the ceiling, one in each slice of the vault.

== See also ==
- History of architecture
