= Baths of Nero (Pisa) =

Coordinates: 43.72226°N 10.40198°E

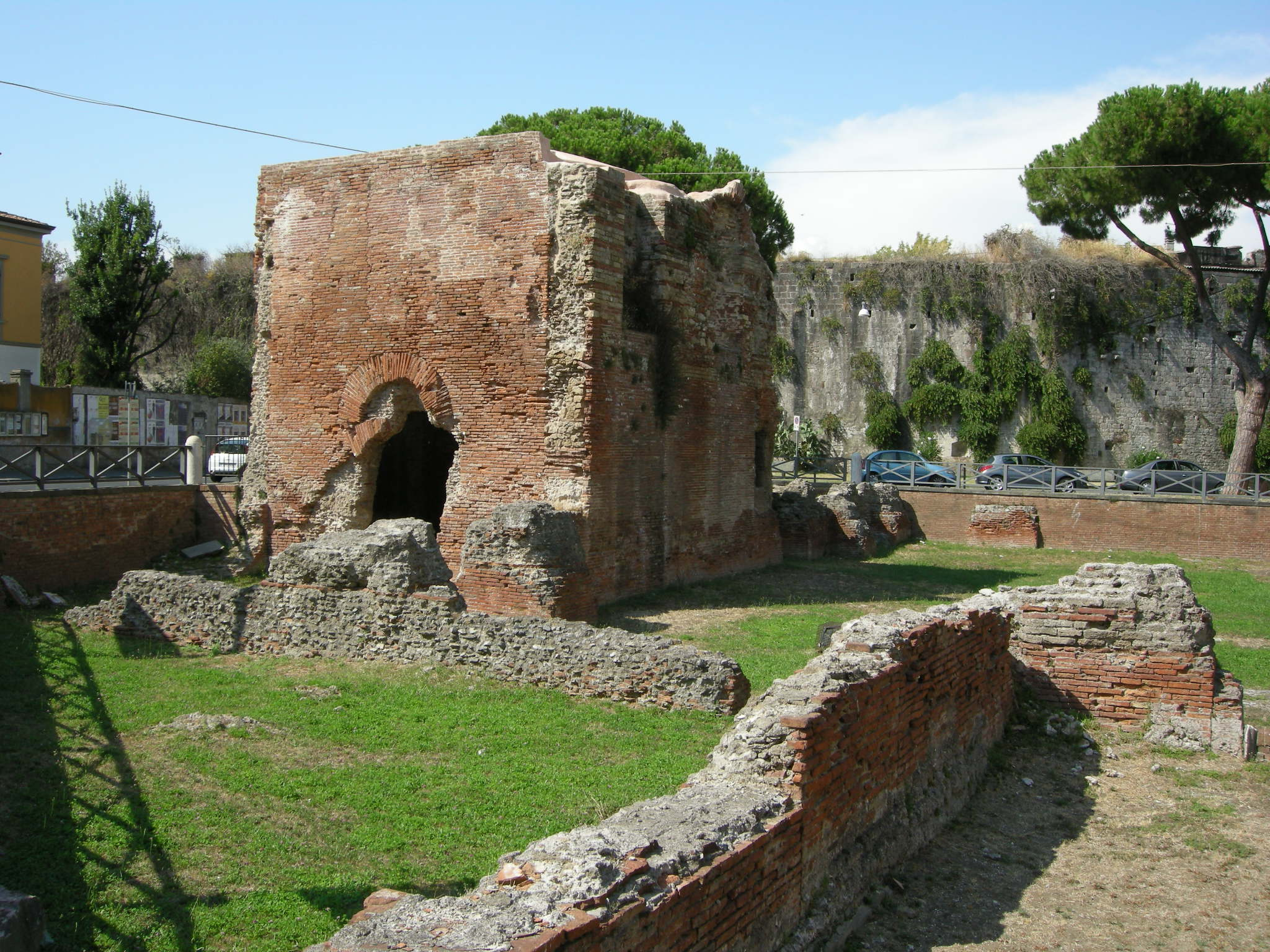
Bagni di Nerone

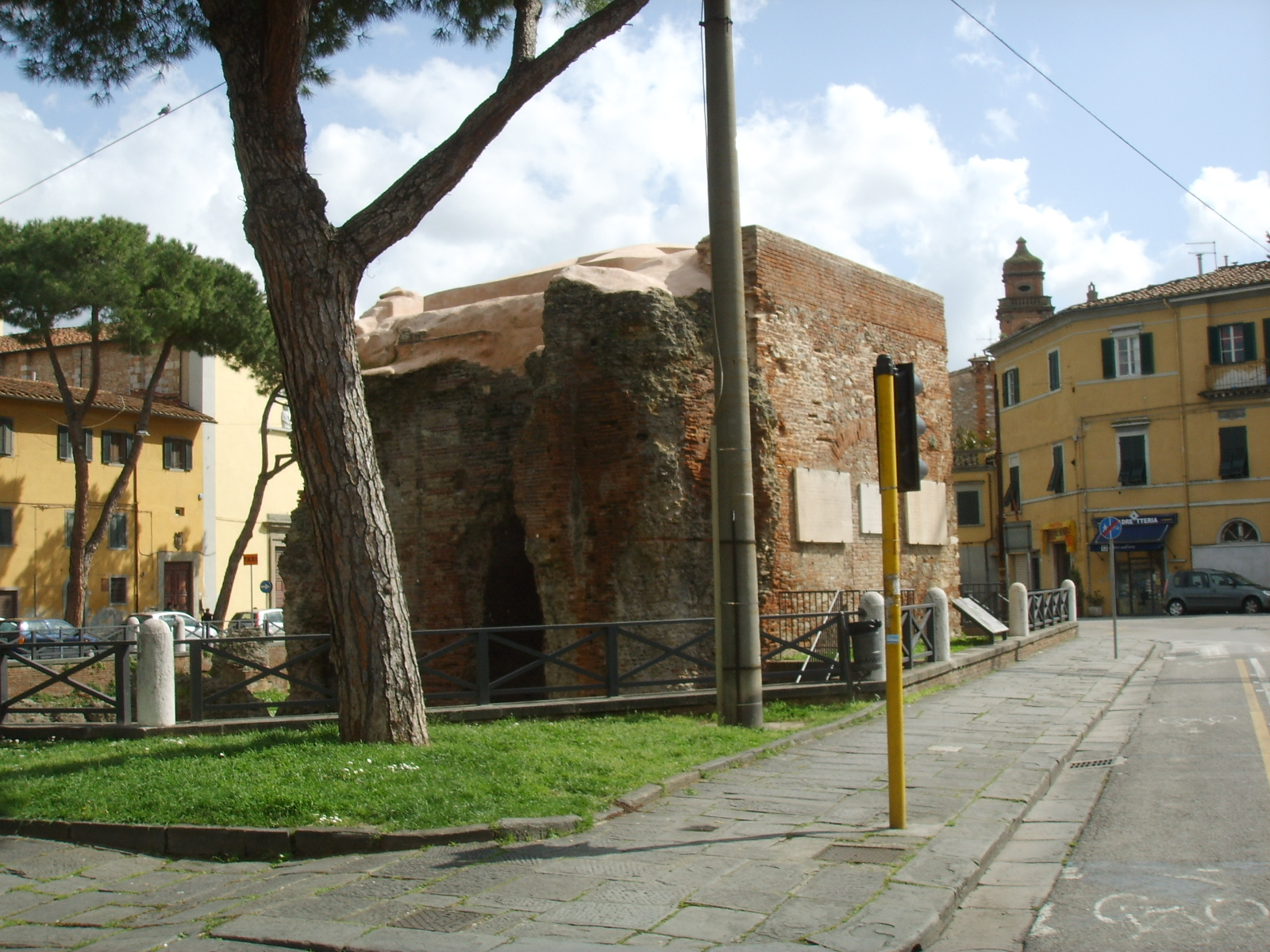
Bagni di Nerone

The Baths of Nero (Italian - Bagni di Nerone) are an archaeological site near the Porta a Lucca in Pisa, then the Roman city of Colonia Pisana. Now below street level, they are the only Roman remains still standing in the city and form a thermae complex.

== History ==
They were given the misnomer 'of Nero' in the medieval period, when they were believed to have been part of a palace - the earliest level actually dates to the final decades of the 1st century, during the reign of Domitian, as suggested by the use of the opus vittatum mixtum building technique with alternating layers of brick and tuff blocks. It was rebuilt during the 2nd century, as evidenced by an inscription (CIL XI, 1433, now held in National Museum of San Matteo) which cites the Veruleii Aproniani family, well-known for owning extensive grounds and ceramics factories. In particular Lucius Venuleius Apronianus Priscus financed the rebuilding. He was a patronus of Roman Pisa and consul of Attidium (a Roman city near present-day Fabriano), who held a number of offices in the Antonine period. As was typical of public figures in the Roman world, he funded several building projects: in 92 he built the Caldaccoli Aqueduct and also funded a building in Corliano.

The best-preserved part of the complex is the laconicum (hot room), composed of an octagonal room with an apse, with a dome-shaped perforated roof, which has been partially restored. There are also the remains of some of the walls of the palaestra of the apodyterium and two walls from the tepidarium. Marble remains and some decorative sculptures have also been found. Its water was supplied by the nearby river Auser and from the Caldaccoli aqueduct.

They were re-discovered and restored in the 16th and 17th centuries by command of Cosimo III, excavated in 1881 by Clemente Lupi, fenced off in 1938 (after the demolition of some neighbouring houses) and finally fully restored in 1947. A covering dome was installed but this was worn out by the weather by 2007, when it was replaced.
