= Frigidarium =

Cold room of Roman baths

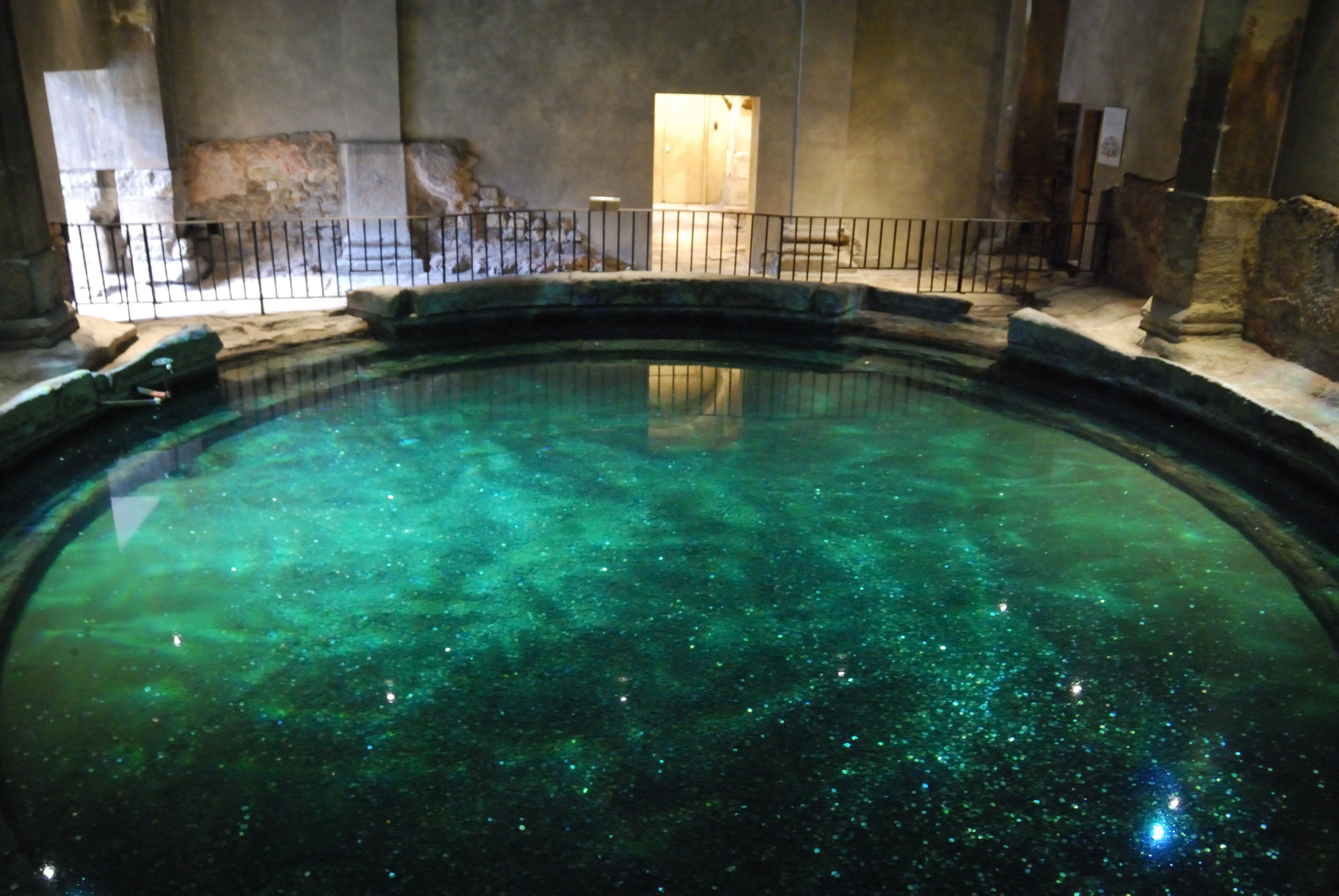
The circular frigidarium, Roman Baths (Bath), England

A frigidarium is one of the three main bath chambers of a Roman bath or thermae, namely the cold room. It often contains a swimming pool.

The succession of bathing activities in the thermae is not known with certainty, but it is thought that the bather would first go through the apodyterium, where he would undress and store his clothes, and then enter the elaeothesium or unctuarium to be anointed with oil. After exercising in a special room or court, he would enjoy the hot room, known as calidarium or caldarium, then the steam room (a moist sudatorium or a dry laconicum), where he would most likely scrape the by now grimy oil with the help of a curved metal strigil off his skin, before finally moving to the frigidarium with its small pool of cold water or sometimes with a large swimming pool (though this, differently from the piscina natatoria, was usually covered). The water could be also kept cold by using snow. The bather would finish by again anointing his body with oil.

The frigidarium was usually located on the northern side of the baths. The largest examples of frigidaria were both in Rome: that of the Baths of Caracalla, located soon after the entrance, measures 58 x 24 m, and that of the Baths of Diocletian, covered by a groin vault. Some, like one in Pompeii, had a circular plan.

== History ==
Italy initially had simple baths without tubs, the lavatrinae. Increasing Hellenisation of Italy led to the development of bathing rooms and public baths. Eventually, individual standing hot water tubs were replaced by collective pools and the development of hypocaust heating. This led to various types of heated rooms, including the caldarium, tepidarium, laconicum or sudatorium, and the frigidarium.

=== Use as Jewish mikveh and/or Christian baptism pool ===
There are examples from Hasmonean and Herodian palaces in Judaea (e.g. Jericho, Herodium), where Jewish ritual immersion pools or mikva'ot were located in the frigidaria of the private royal bathing facilities.

A Roman octagonal bath-house, c. 14.5 m across, centered around an octagonal frigidarium pool over 4 m across and with a large brick conduit for supplying cold water, probably dated to 330–335 CE during the time of Constantine the Great, was excavated at Bax Farm, Teynham, Kent. It had been suggested that the octagonal frigidarium could have been used for Christian baptism or as a Jewish ritual immersion pool.

== See also ==
- Ancient Roman bathing
- Palaestra – type of ancient Greek wrestling school with bathing facilities including a room for cold bathing, the loutrón
