= Baptisterium =

Ancient Roman bathing basin

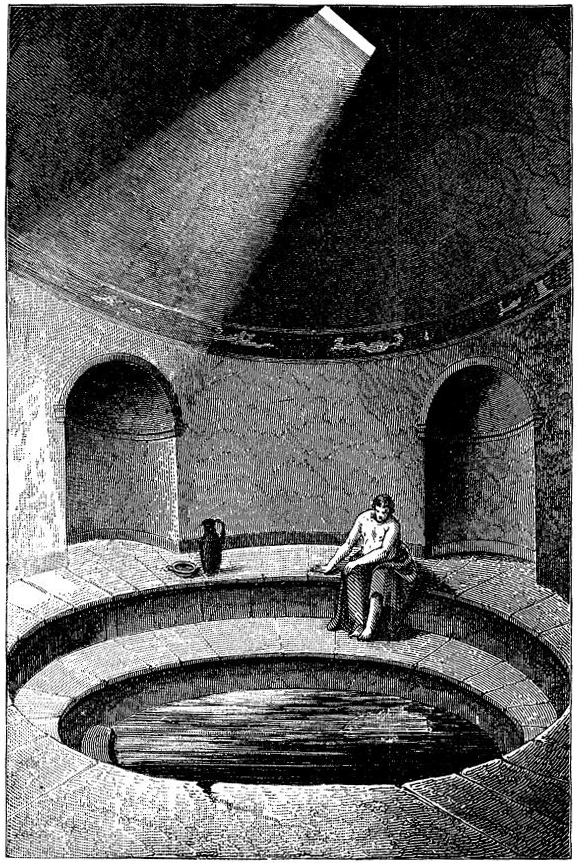
The baptisterium in the frigidarium of the thermae at Pompeii

In classical antiquity, a baptisterium (Ancient Greek: βαπτιστήριον) was a large basin installed in private or public baths into which bathers could plunge, or even swim about. It is more commonly called natatorium or piscina.
