= Caldaccoli Aqueduct =

Ancient Roman aqueduct in Italy

Coordinates: 43.7690°N 10.4368°E

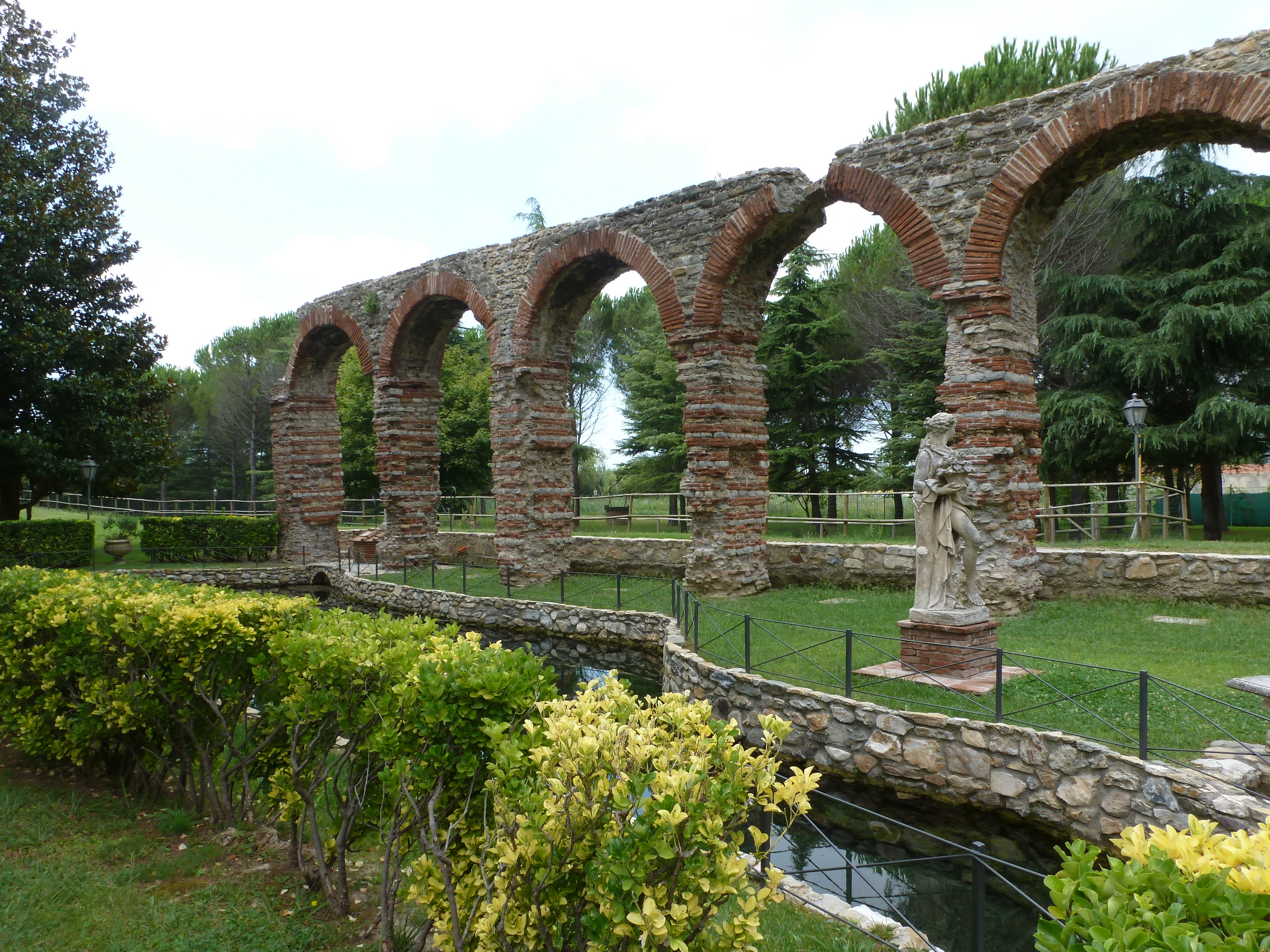
Remains from the aqueduct

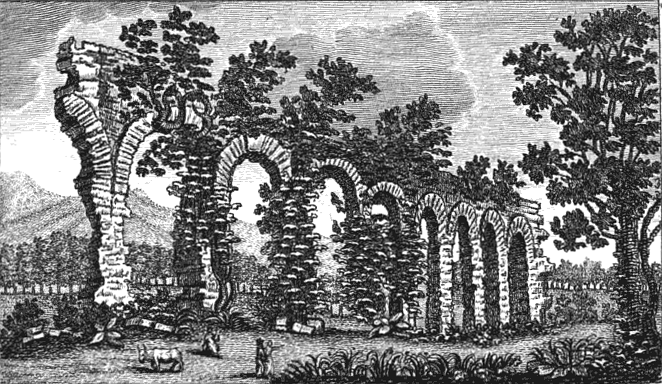
Early 19th century engraving of remains from the aqueduct

The Caldaccoli Aqueduct was an ancient Roman aqueduct dating to the 1st century. It carried water from the thermal springs at the resort of Caldaccoli, then known as the calidae acquae, (literally, hot waters), near the present-day San Giuliano Terme, to the Roman baths at Pisa.

== The route ==
The route started near Corliano (Conserva di Corliano), where an inscription was found (CIL XI 1433) which reports the date of construction of the aqueduct as 92 AD by Lucius Venuleius Montanus Apronianus, patron of the Pisan colony and consul of Attidium (Roman city near Fabriano). The underground pipeline, consisting of fistulae aquariae in glazed terracotta and supported by a masonry base, descended from the mountain as far as Caldaccoli, here the water was conveyed into a large basin and then channelled onto the arches.

Of the first section of the aqueduct the remains of a pillar with two cut-off arches arranged exactly at right angles. Continuing along the path in a southerly direction you pass to the eight arches still standing. Subsequently, as described by Giovanni Targioni Tozzetti in the mid- eighteenth century, there were some remains of the pillars in the ground up to the Fosso del Mulino, after which other pillars continued in a straight line and then lost their traces. The aqueduct therefore, following the axes of the ancient north-east/south-west centuriation of the countryside, may have curved towards Pisa passing through Gello, where in the eighteenth century other remains of the pillars were found in Campolungo locality. It ended at the gates of Pisa just before Porta a Lucca, where there may have been a castellum aquae to distribute the water, a large part of which would have gone to the Roman baths.

== See also ==
- List of aqueducts in the Roman Empire
- List of Roman aqueducts by date
- Ancient Roman technology
- Roman engineering
