= Caldarium =

Room with a hot plunge bath, used in a Roman bath complex

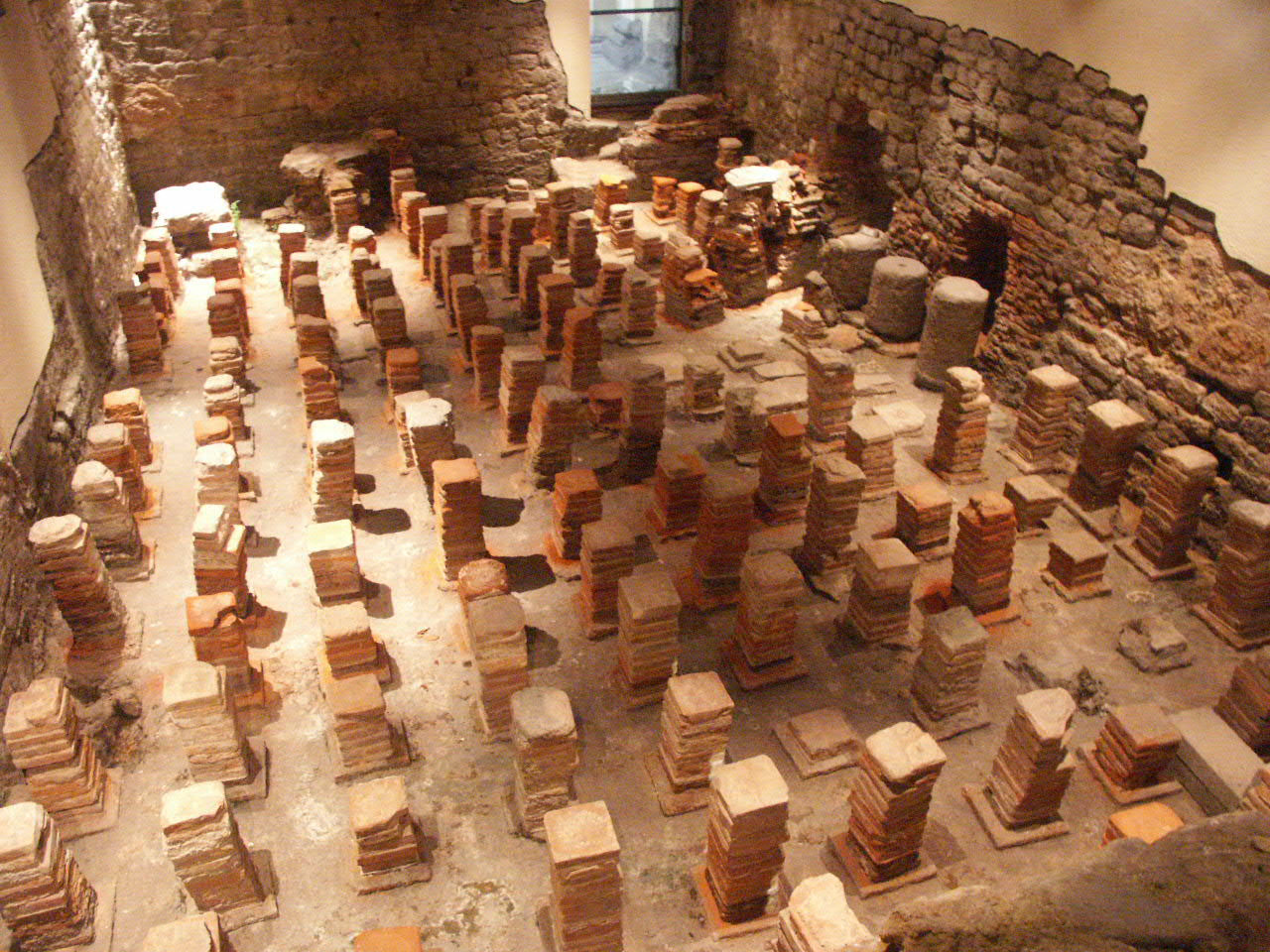
Caldarium from the Roman baths at Bath, England. The floor has been removed to reveal the empty space where the hot air flowed through to heat the floor.

A caldarium (also called a calidarium, cella caldaria or cella coctilium) was a room with a hot plunge bath, used in a Roman bath complex. The boiler supplying hot water to a baths complex was also called caldarium.

This was a very hot and steamy room heated by a hypocaust, an underfloor heating system using tunnels with hot air, heated by a furnace tended by slaves. It was also the hottest room in the regular sequence of bathing rooms; after the caldarium, bathers would progress back through the tepidarium to the frigidarium.

A caldarium in both public and private baths followed a common plan which had three main parts. The common arrangement would include a warm-water bath – usually called alveus, but also referred to as piscina calida or solium – sunk into the floor, a semicircular alcove – laconicum – where bathers would sit in order to induce sweating, and in the middle of the room a vacant space – sudatorium or sudatio – meant for physical exercise before going to sit in laconicum.

The bath's patrons would use olive oil to cleanse themselves by applying it to their bodies and using a strigil to remove the excess. This was sometimes left on the floor for the slaves to pick up or put back in the pot for the women to use for their hair.

The temperature of the caldarium is not known exactly. However, a floor surface temperature above 41–42 °C (106–108 °F) would have been uncomfortable to stand on with bare feet.

== See also ==
- Ancient Roman bathing
