= Laconicum =

Dry sweating room of Roman baths

Laconicum of the Roman Baths of Évora, Portugal

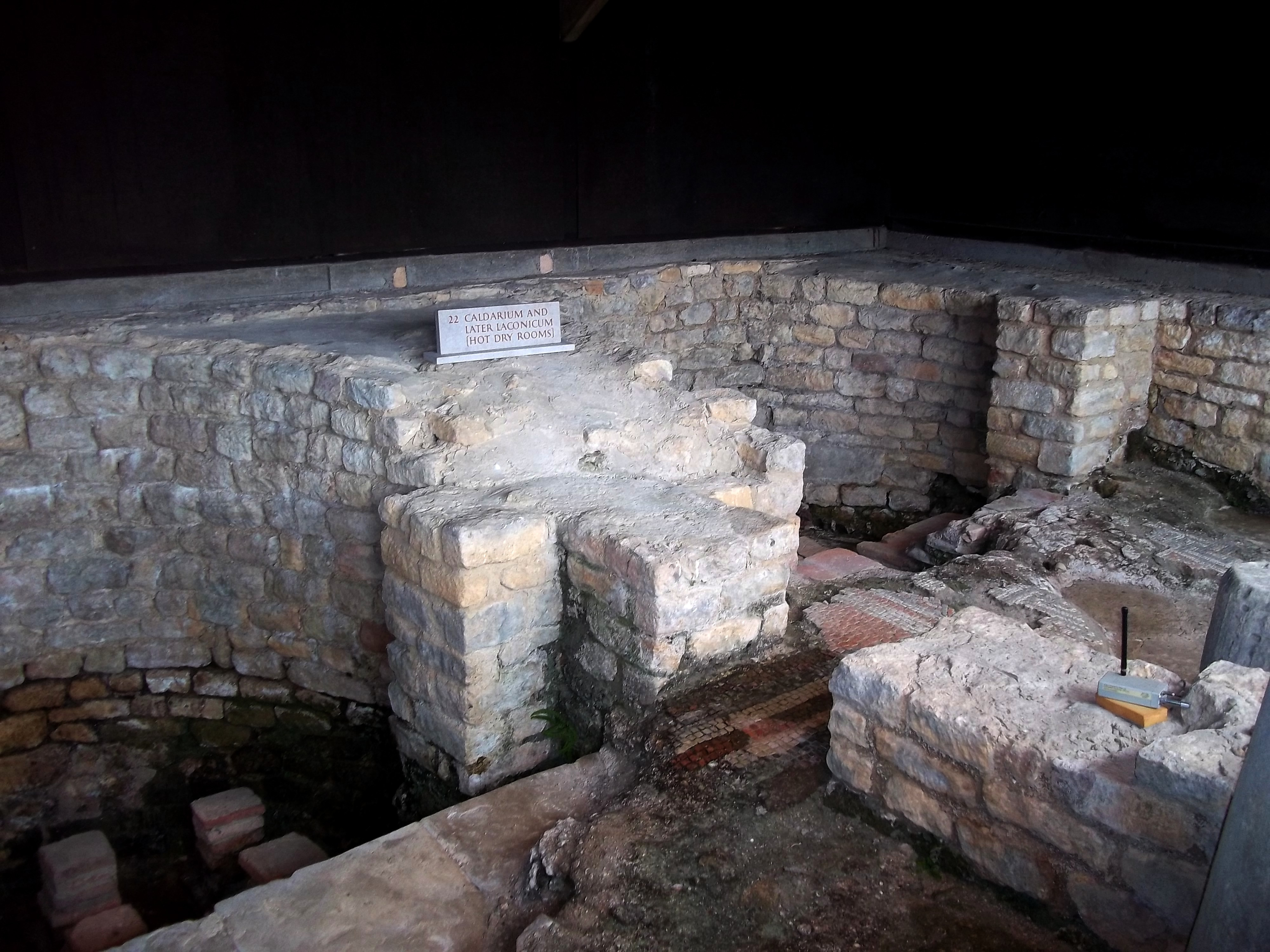
Laconicum at Chedworth Roman Villa, England

The laconicum (i.e. Spartan, sc. balneum, "bath") was the dry sweating room of the Roman thermae, sometimes contiguous to the caldarium or hot room. The name was given to it (Laconia: Sparta) since it was the only form of warm bath that the Spartans admitted. The laconicum was usually a circular room with niches in the axes of the diagonals and was covered by a conical roof with a circular opening at the top, according to Vitruvius (v. 10), from which a brazen shield is suspended by chains, capable of being so lowered and raised as to regulate the temperature.

It is similar to a sudatorium, or steam bath, where water is added to produce steam.

Sometimes, as in the old baths at Pompeii, the laconicum was provided in an apse at one end of the caldarium, but as a rule it was a separate room raised to a higher temperature and had no bath in it. In addition to the hypocaust under the floor, the wall was lined with ceramic flue pipes.

The largest laconicum, about 75 feet (23 m) in diameter, was that built by Agrippa in the Baths of Agrippa on the south side of the Pantheon, and is referred to by Cassius Dio, who states that, in addition to other works, he constructed the hot bath chamber which he called the Laconicum Gymnasium. All traces of this building are lost; but in the additions made to the thermae of Agrippa by Septimius Severus, another laconicum was built farther south, portions of which still exist in the so-called Arco di Ciambella.

== See also ==
- Ancient Roman bathing
