= Sudatorium =

Vaulted sweating-room in a Roman bath

In architecture, a sudatorium is a vaulted sweating-room (sudor, "sweat") or steam bath (Latin: sudationes, steam) of the Roman baths or thermae. The Roman architectural writer Vitruvius (v. 2) refers to it as concamerata sudatio. It is similar to a laconicum, or dry heat bath, with the addition of water to produce steam.

In order to obtain the great heat required, the whole wall was lined with vertical terracotta flue pipes of rectangular section, placed side by side, through which hot air and smoke from the suspensura passed to an exit in the roof.

When Arabs and Turks overran the Eastern Roman Empire, they adopted and developed this feature in their baths or hammams.
