= Roman Baths =

Roman baths are thermae.

Historic examples of Roman Baths include:

- Aïn Doura Baths, a ruin in Dougga, Tunisia
- Għajn Tuffieħa Roman Baths, a ruin in Malta
- Roman Baths of Ankara, a ruin in Ankara, Turkey
- Roman Baths (Bath), a well-preserved site in England
- Roman Baths, Beirut, Lebanon
- Roman baths of Toledo, a ruin in Toledo, Spain
- Roman Baths Museum, inside the remains of the fortress of Isca Augusta at Caerleon, Wales
- Roman Baths, Strand Lane, a cold spring bath near London, reputedly of Roman origin
- Roman baths (Amman), Jordan
- Thermae Bath Spa, a historic spa with a contemporary spa in Bath, England
- Welwyn Roman Baths, a ruin near Welwyn Garden City, England
- Roman baths of Gafsa, Tunisia

== Other ==
- Roman Baths (Potsdam), a 19th-century Roman-inspired royal complex in Germany
- The Roman Bath, a 1974 Bulgarian play

== See also ==
- List of Roman public baths
