= List of Roman public baths =

This is a list of ancient Roman public baths (thermae).

== Urban baths ==
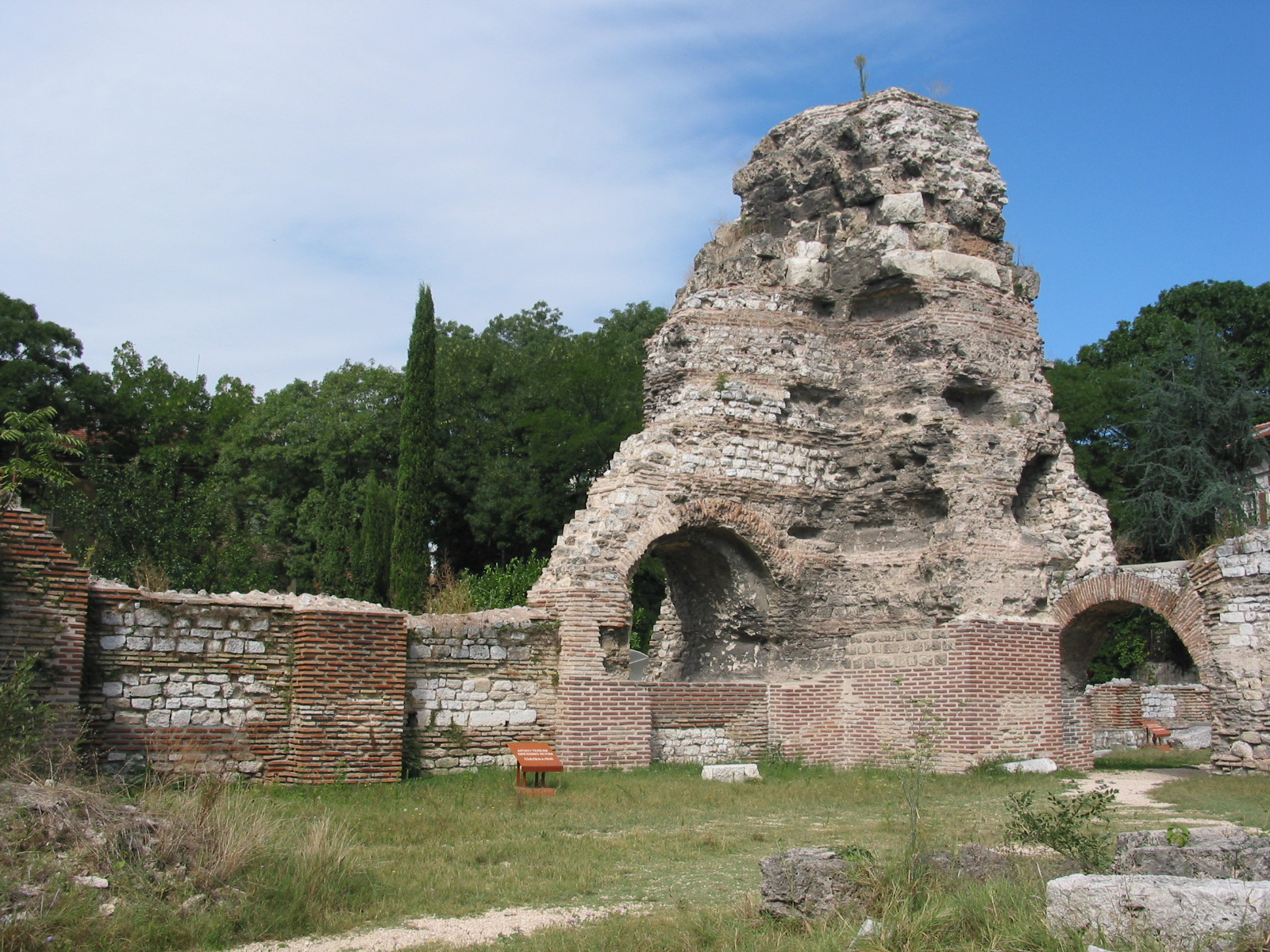
Remains of the Roman baths of Varna, Bulgaria

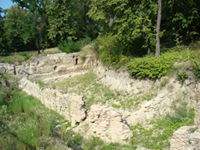
Remains of Roman Thermae, Hisarya, Bulgaria

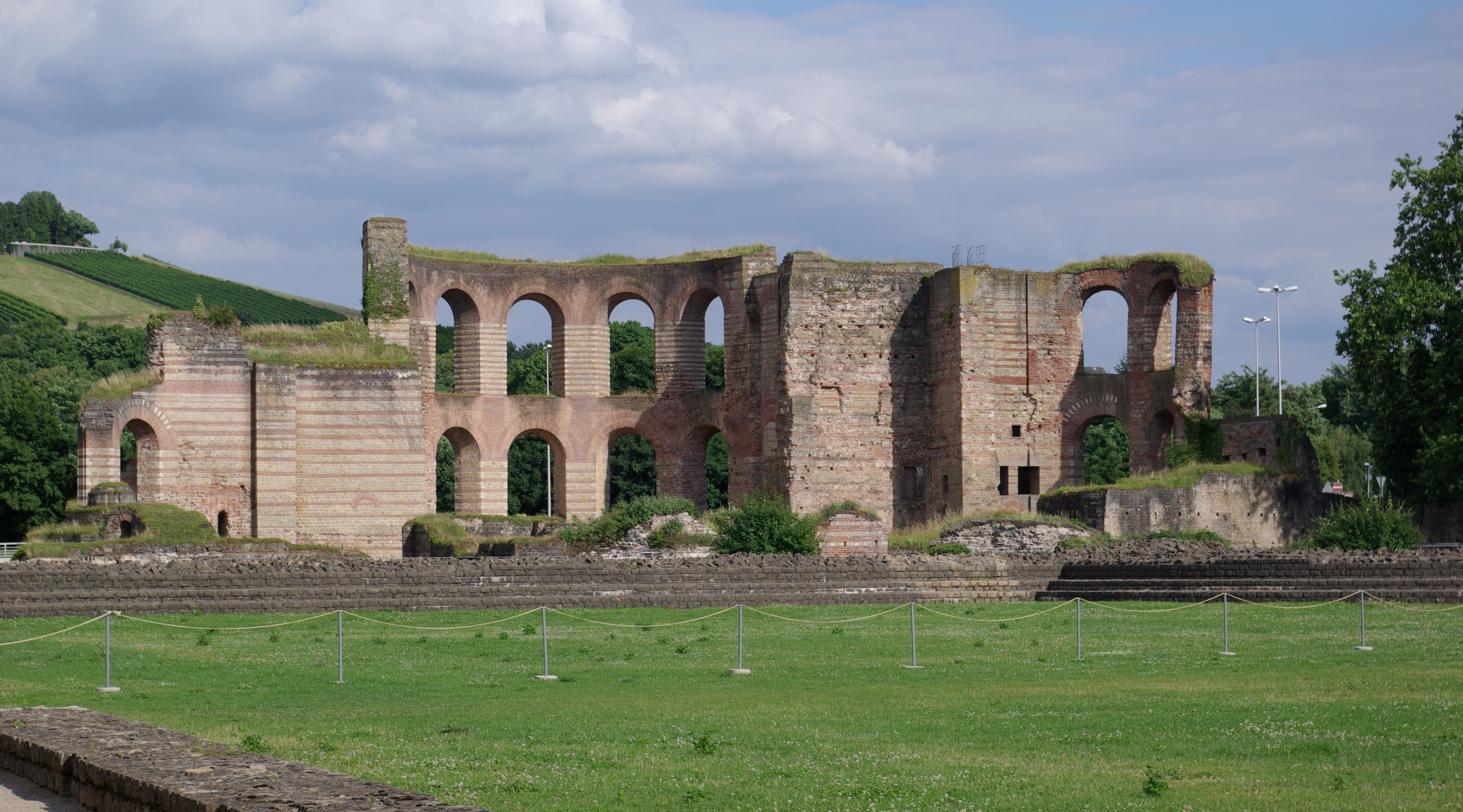
Bath ruins in Trier, Germany

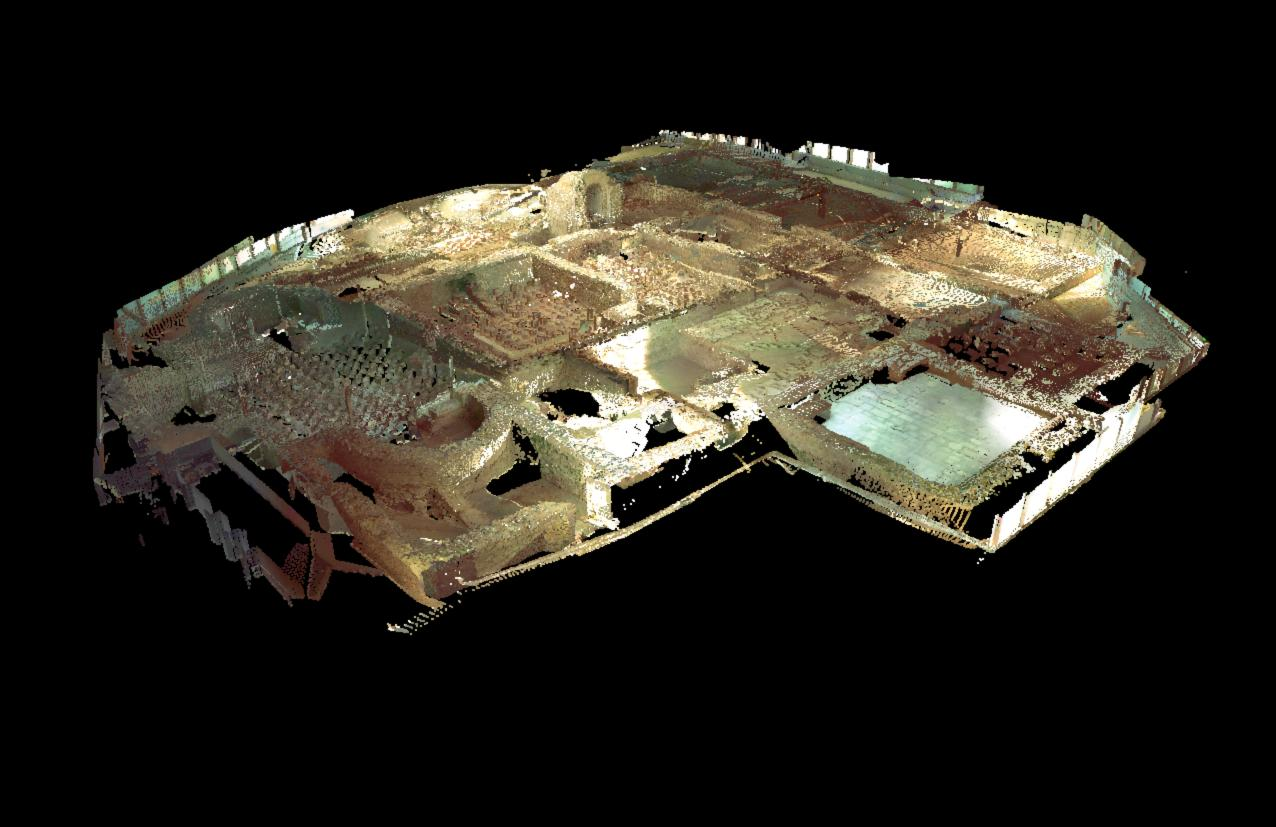
Photo-textured 3D isometric view/plan of the Roman Baths in Weißenburg, Germany, using data from laser scan technology.

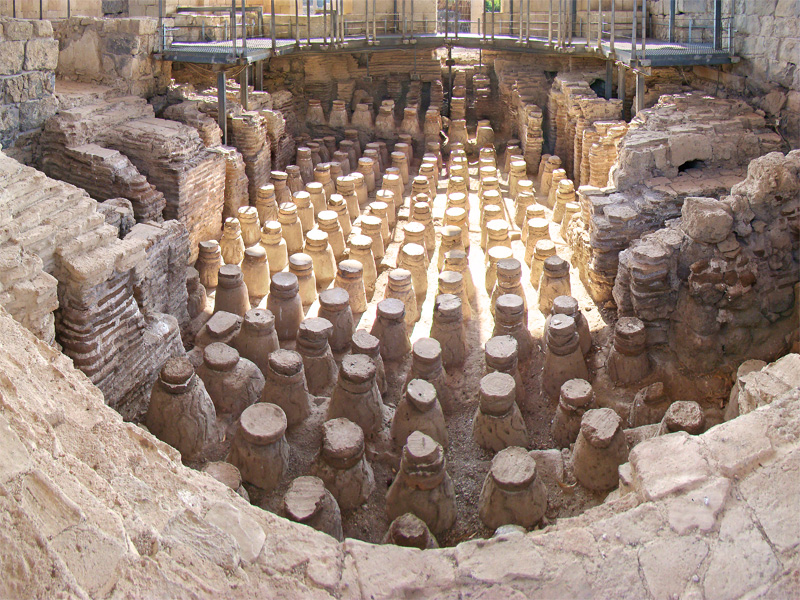
Roman baths of Beit She'an, Israel

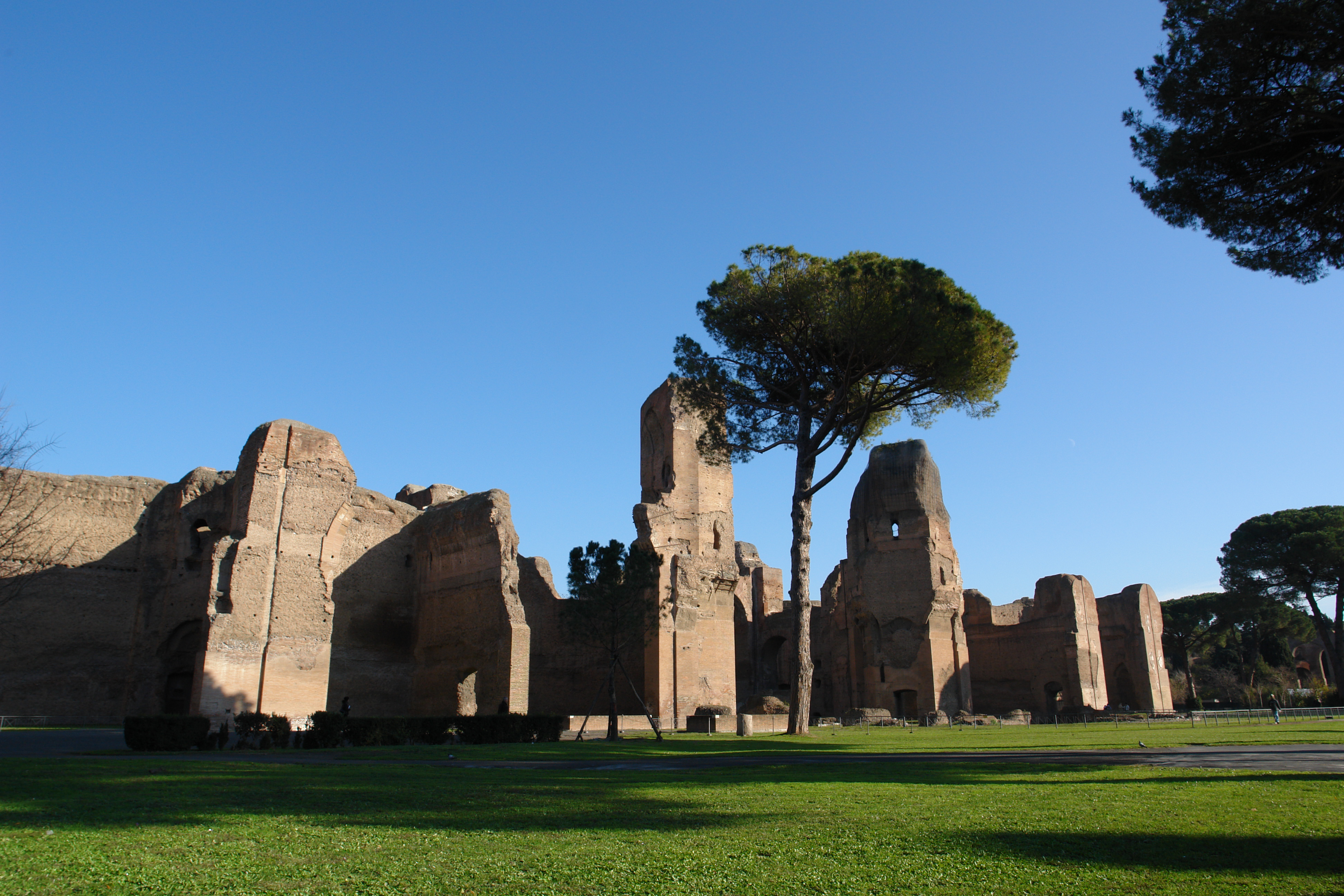
The Baths of Caracalla, Rome

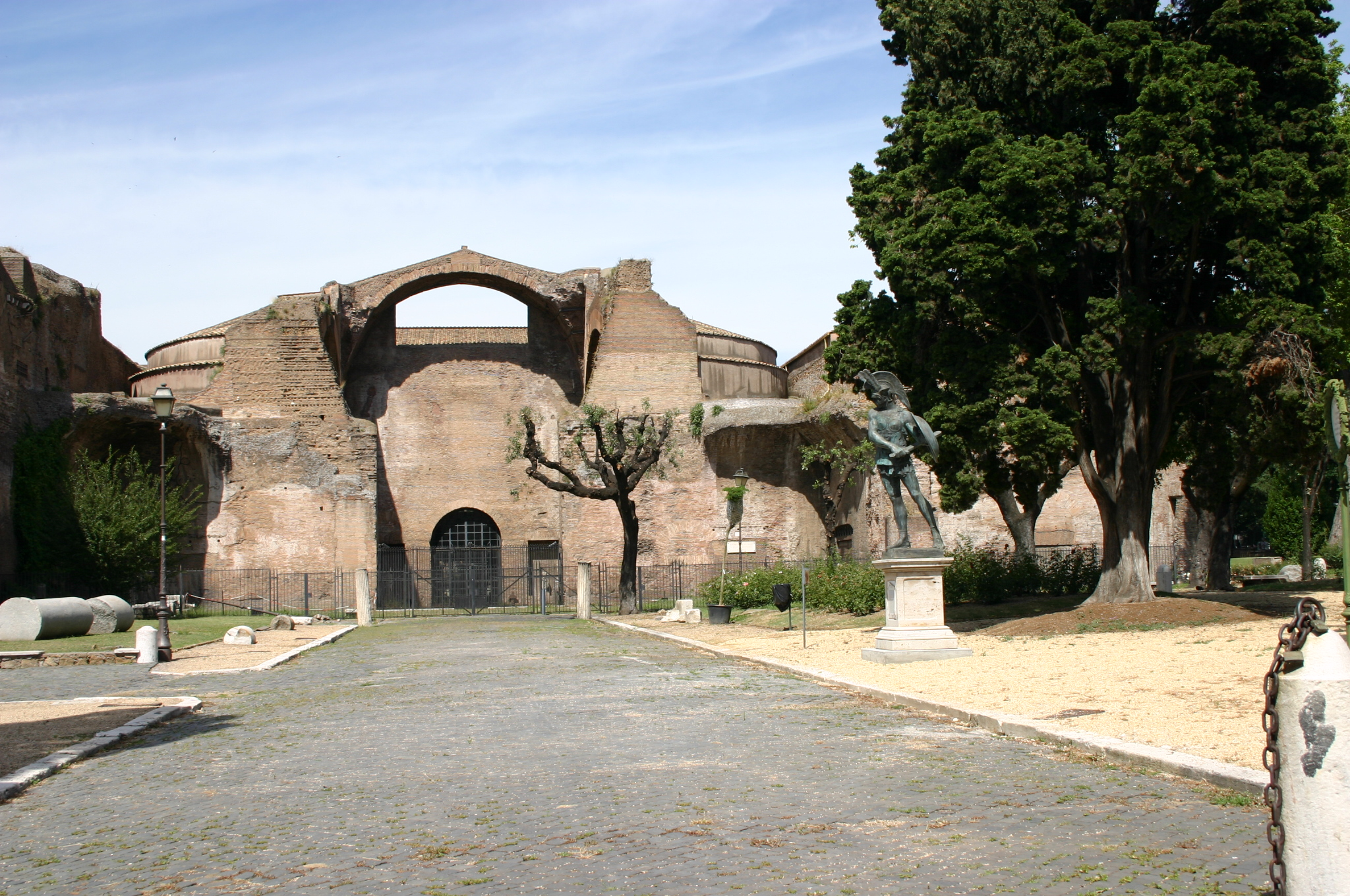
Remains of the Baths of Diocletian, Rome

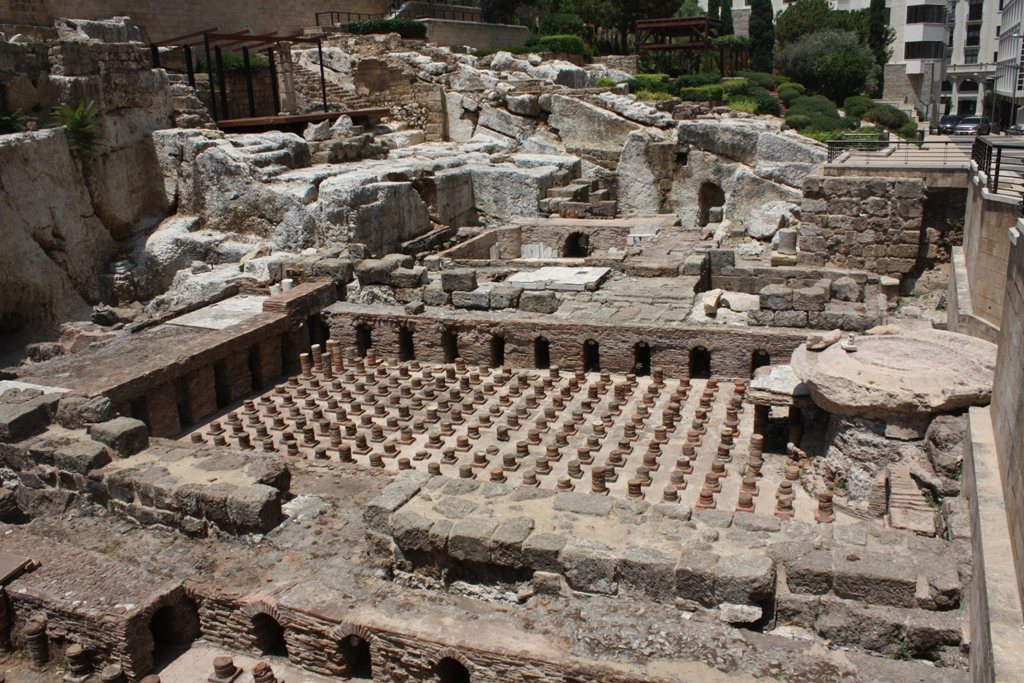
Ruins of the Roman Baths of Berytus, Beirut, Lebanon

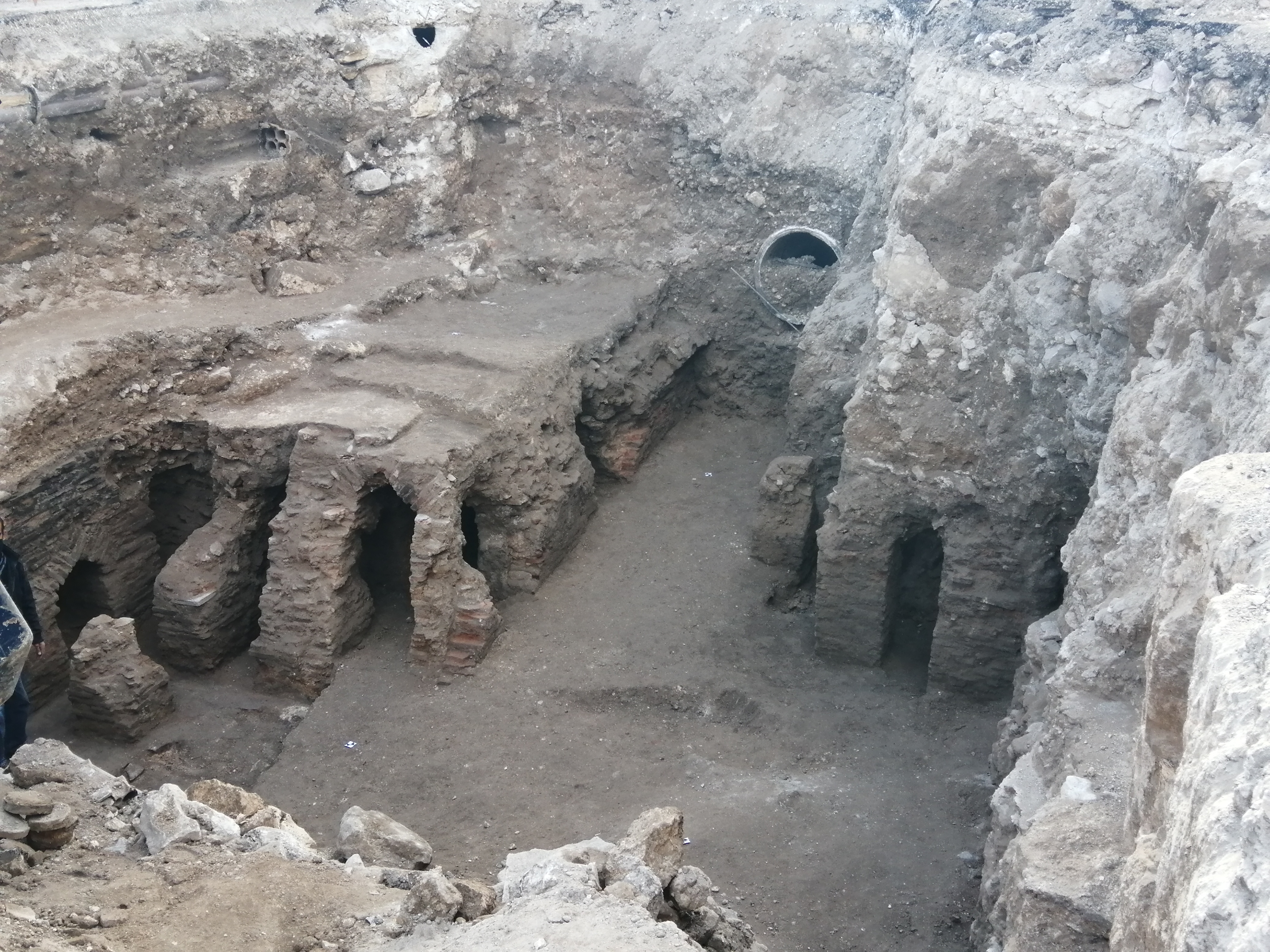
Ruins of Roman baths in Amman, Jordan

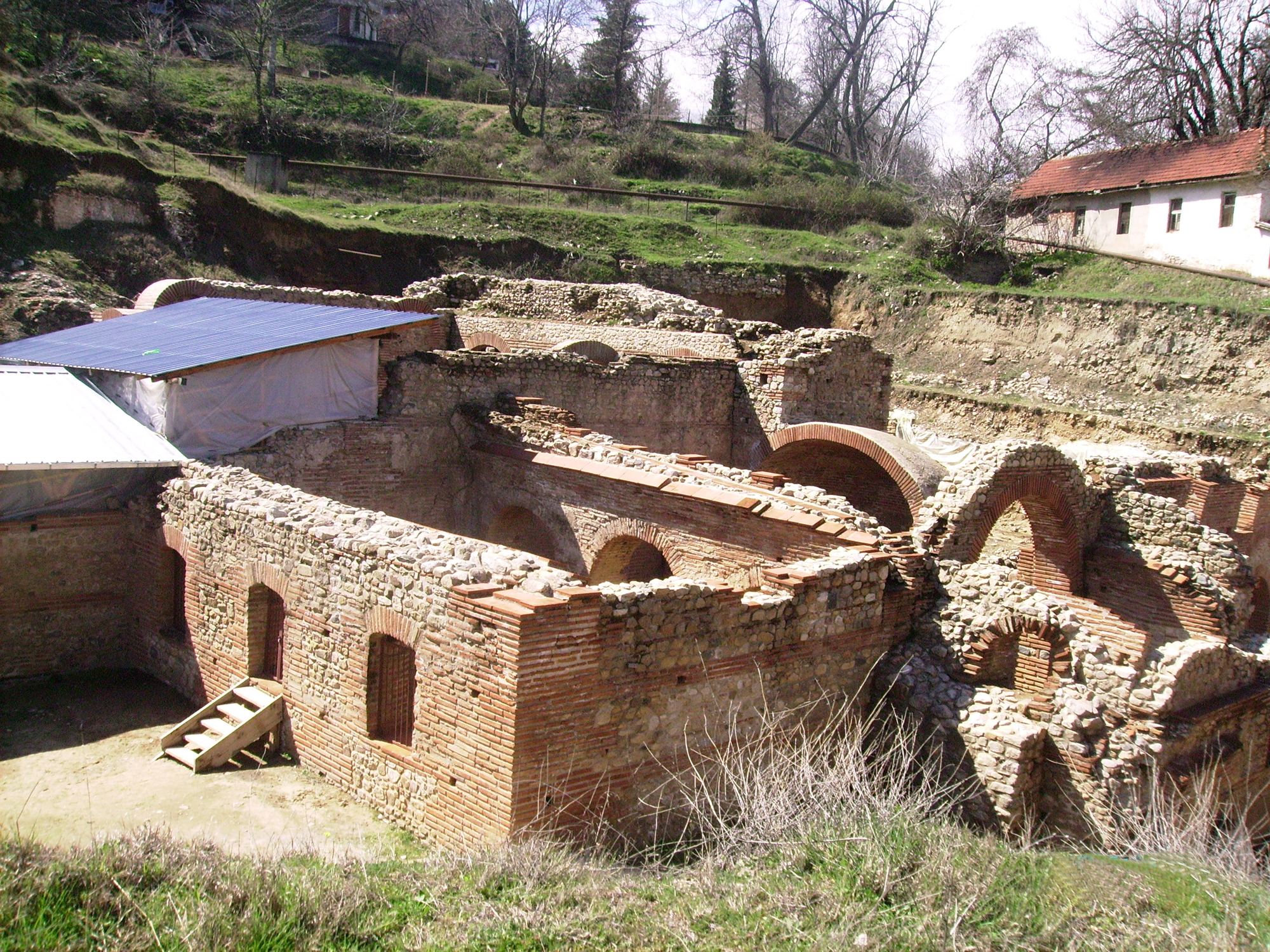
Roman bath ruins near Strumica

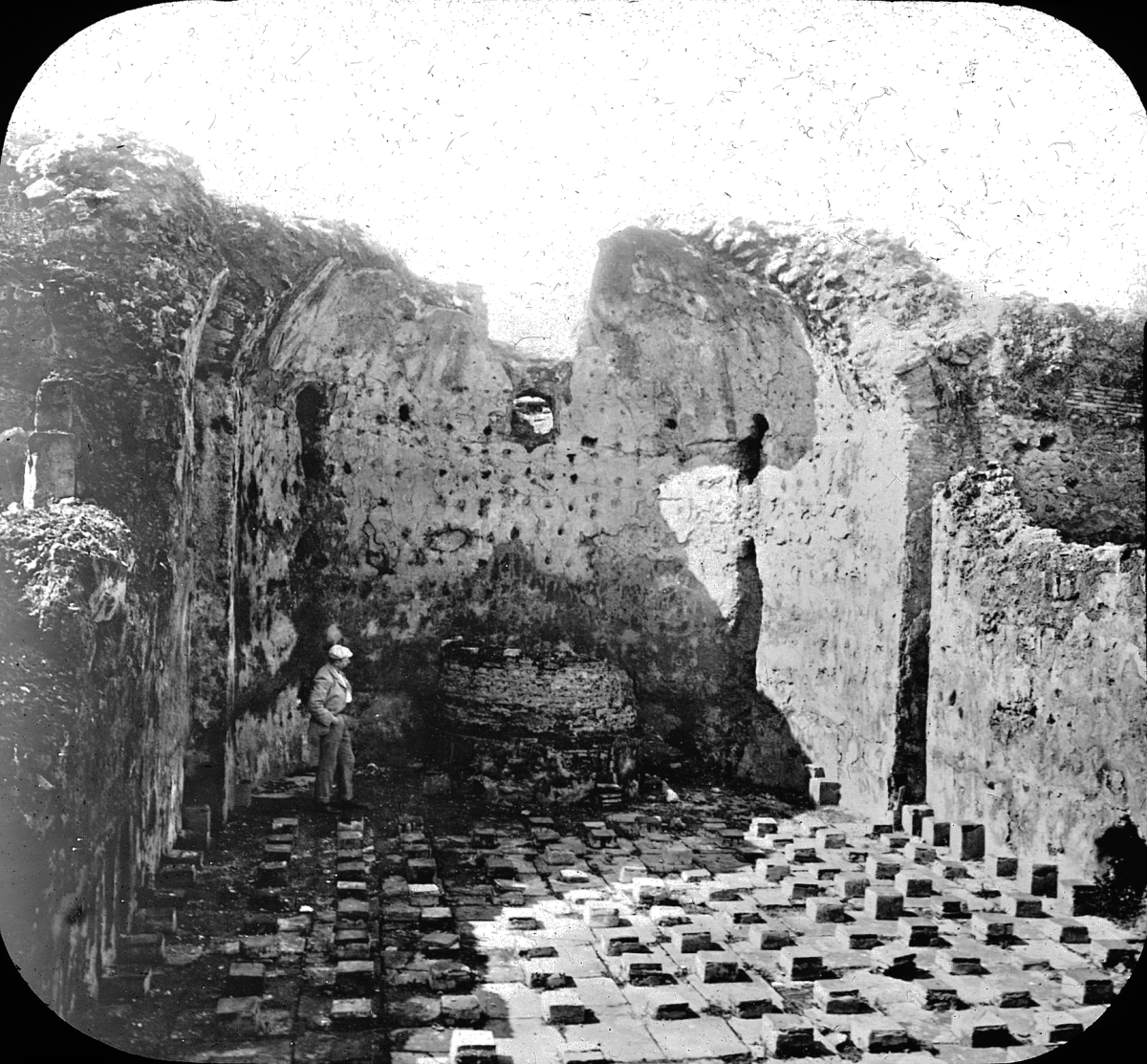
Pompeii, Italy. Hot room, Roman bath, Pompeii. Brooklyn Museum Archives, Goodyear Archival Collection

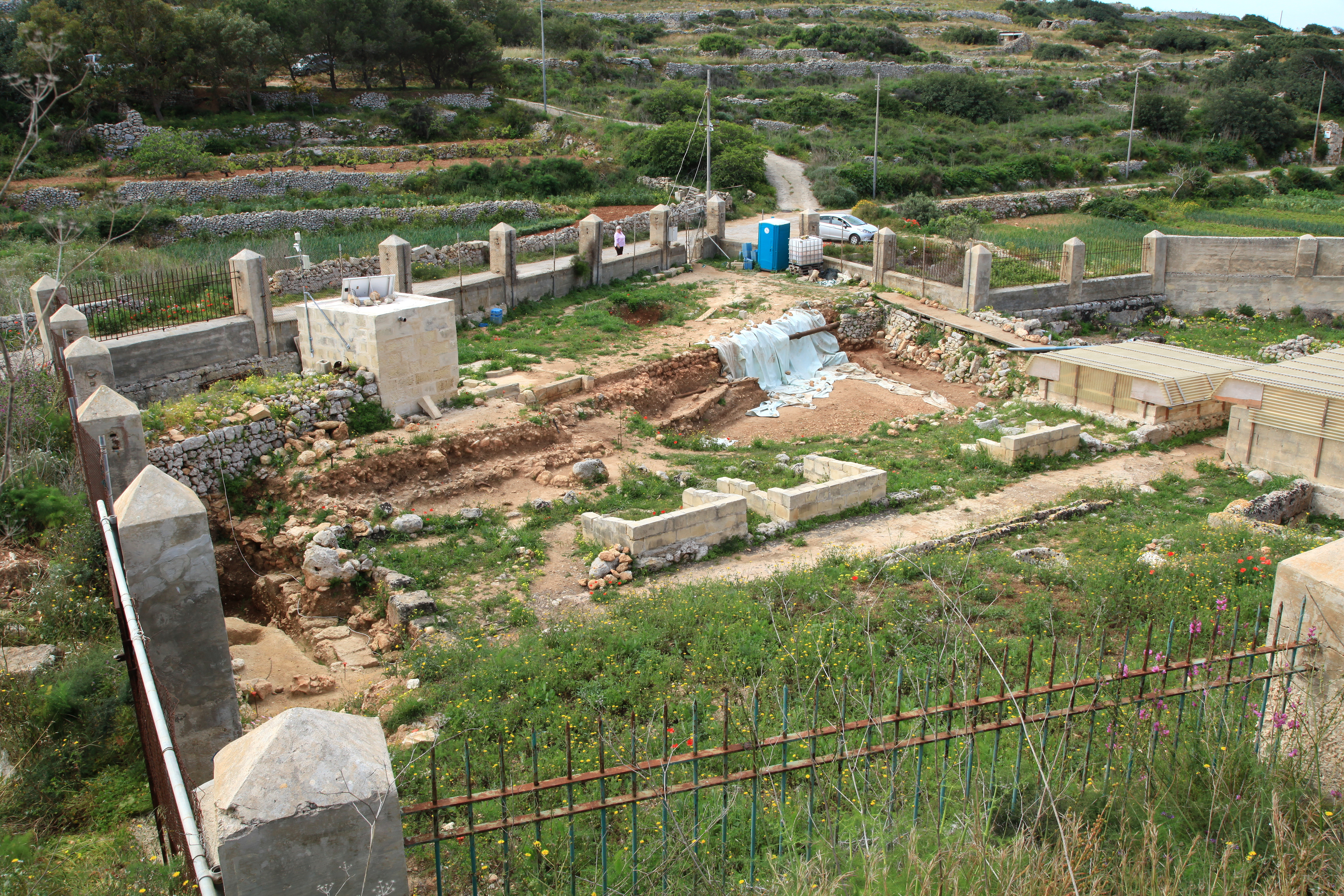
Għajn Tuffieħa Roman Baths, Malta

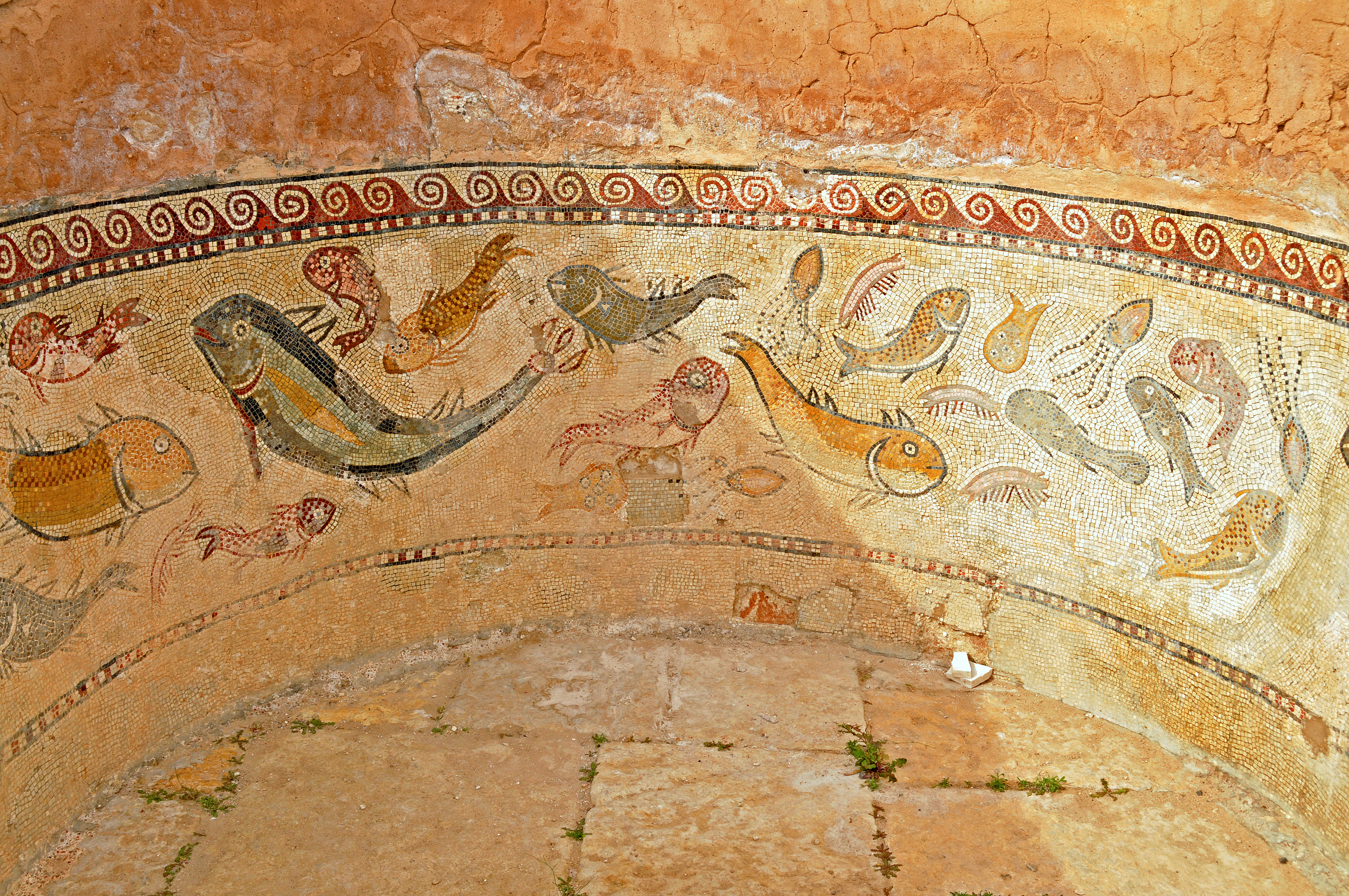
Roman bath with fish mosaic, Sbeitla, Tunisia

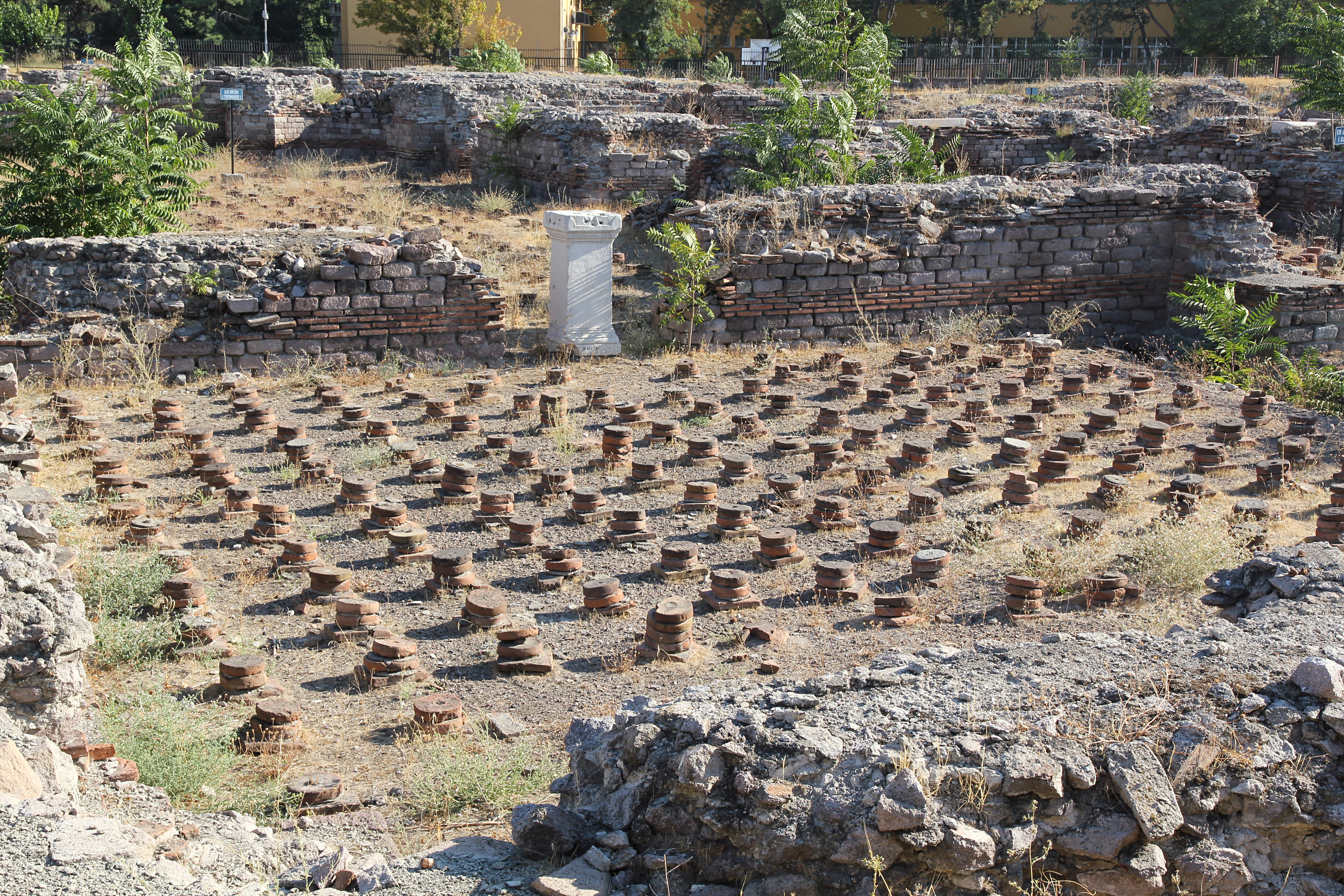
The Baths of Ancyra, Ankara, Turkey

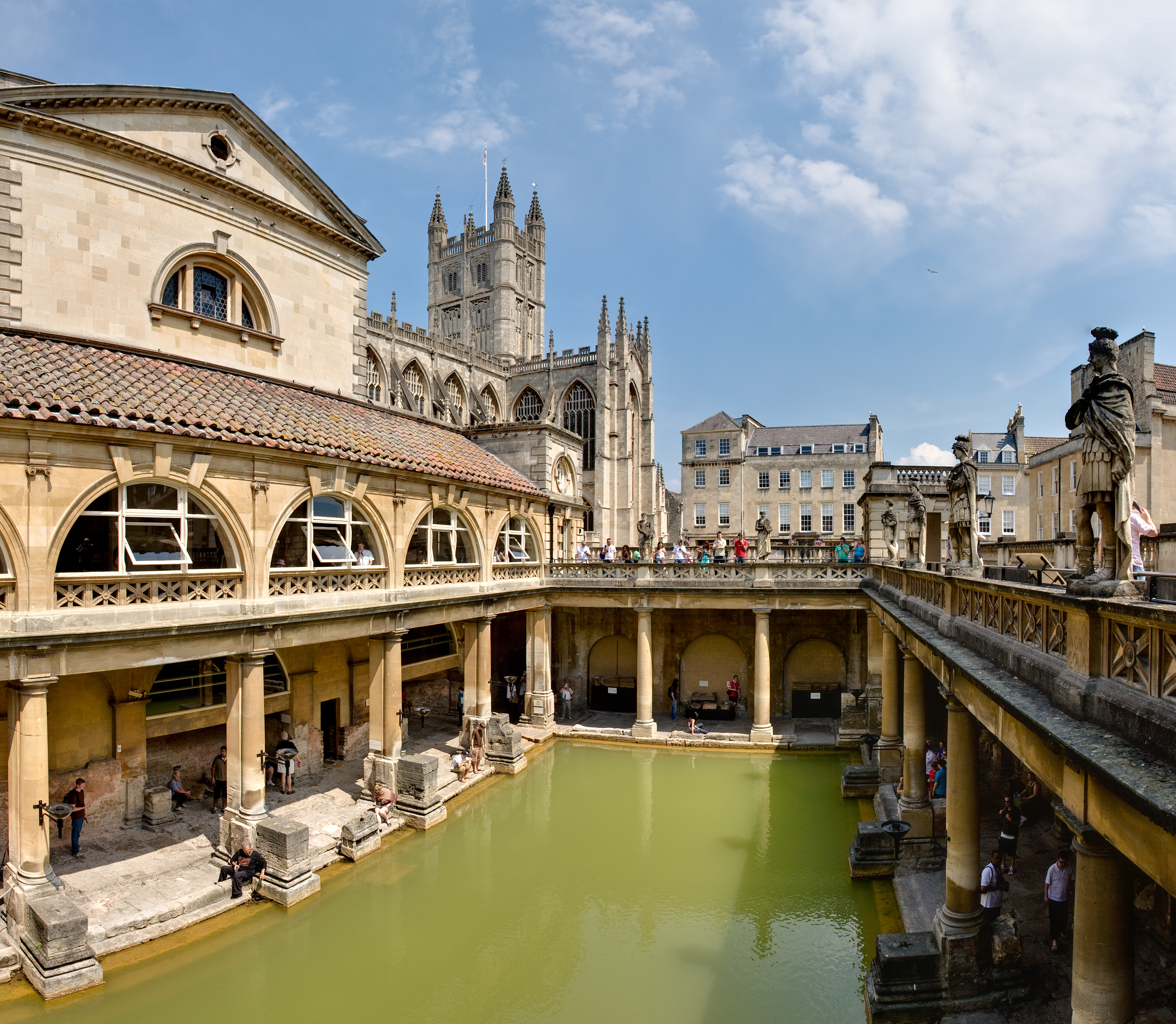
Roman Baths (Bath), United Kingdom

=== Algeria ===
- Timgad
- Guelma (Calama)
- Héliopolis
- Hammam Meskoutine (Aquae Tibilitanae)
- Hammam Righa (Aquae Calidae)
- Hammam Essalihine (Aquae Flavianae)

=== Austria ===
- Carnuntum

=== Bulgaria ===
- Kyustendil (Pautalia)
- Roman Thermae, Varna (Odessus)
- Hisarya (Augusta Diocletianopolis)
- Sozopol

=== Croatia ===
- Varaždinske Toplice (Aquae Iasae)
- Daruvar (Aquae Balissae)
- Topusko

=== France ===
- Arles – Thermes de Constantin
- Aix-en-Provence (Aquae Sextiae)
- Bagnères-de-Luchon (Onesiorum Thermae of Strabo)
- Cimiez (Cemenelum)
- Glanum, near today's Saint-Rémy-de-Provence
- Lillebonne (Juliobona)
- Metz (Divodurum Mediomatricorum) - Thermes de Metz
- Paris – Thermes de Cluny
- Plombières-les-Bains – Calodae
- Saintes, Charente-Maritime (Mediolanum Santonum)
- Bliesbruck baths

=== Germany ===
- Baden-Baden, Baden-Württemberg
- Trier Imperial Baths, Barbara Baths, and Forum Baths in Trier, Germany
- Weißenburg
- Badenweiler Thermae
- Xanten, Nordrhein-Westfalen

=== Hungary ===
- Aquincum

=== Israel ===
- Avdat
- Ashkelon
- Beit She'an
- Caesarea Maritima
- Ir Ovot
- Jerusalem
- Mamshit
- Masada
- Nazareth

=== Jordan ===
- Roman baths, Amman

=== Italy ===
- Bagnaccio
- Baths at Ostia
- Baths of Agrippa
- Baths of Caracalla
- Terme dell'Indirizzo, Catania
- Baths of Diocletian
- Baths of Hercules
- Baths of Titus
- Baths of Trajan
- Chieti (Teate Marrucinorum), Abruzzo
- Fiesole
- Herculaneum
- Pompeii (ruins)
- Baths of Puteoli
- Terme Taurine

=== Lebanon ===
- Roman Baths, Beirut, Beirut

=== Libya ===
- Leptis Magna – Hadrian's baths
- Hunting Baths, Leptis Magna

=== North Macedonia ===
- Strumica (Tiveriopolis)

=== Malta ===
- Għajn Tuffieħa Roman Baths
- Ta' Bista Catacombs and Roman baths
- Xemxija Roman Baths
- Xaghra Ramla l-Hamra Roman Baths (Gozo)

=== The Netherlands ===
- Heerlen
- Maastricht – Op de Thermen

=== Portugal ===
- Chaves
- Évora
- Roman Thermae of Maximinus

=== Romania ===
- Băile Herculane
- Germisara (Geoagiu)

=== Spain ===
- Caldes de Malavella, Gerona
- Caldes de Montbui, Barcelona
- Clunia, Province of Burgos
- Lucus Augusti, Lugo
- Baetulo, Badalona, Barcelona
- Empúries, Girona
- Roman baths of Toledo

=== Tunisia ===
- Dougga – Bath of the Cyclopses (ruins)
- Dougga – Antonian Bath (ruins)
- Dougga – Aïn Doura Bath (ruins)
- Dougga – Licinian Baths (ruins)
- Gafsa – Roman baths of Gafsa
- Sbeitla – Roman baths of Sbeitla (ruins)
- Tunis (Carthage) – Baths of Antoninus

=== Turkey ===
- Ankara – Baths of Ancyra (ruins)
- Muğla – Kaunos
- Yozgat – Basilica Therma

=== United Kingdom ===
- Bath – Roman Baths
- Cheapside Baths, in London
- Exeter, Devon
- Huggin Hill Baths, in London
- Leicester – Jewry Wall
- Ribchester, in Lancashire
- Tripontium, near today's Rugby, Warwickshire
- Welwyn, Hertfordshire – Welwyn Roman Baths

== Military bathhouses ==
- Roman Britain
  - Bearsden, Greater Glasgow area, Scotland
  - Prestatyn, Wales
  - Ravenglass, Cumbria – Roman Bath House
  - Vindolanda, Little Chesters, near Hadrian's Wall
  - York – Roman Bath

== Roman Britain villas with bathhouse ==
- Chedworth Roman Villa
- Fishbourne Roman Palace
- Wymondley Roman Villa
