= Roman Thermae of Maximinus =

Cultural heritage monument in Braga, Portugal

- Alto da Cividade
- Interactive map of Roman Thermae of Maximinus
- 41°32′46.64″N 8°25′46.52″W
- Type: Roman Thermae
- Location: Braga, Cávado, Norte, Portugal

Site notes
- Elevation: 175 m (574 ft)
- Length: 35.00 m (114.83 ft)
- Width: 31.00 m (101.71 ft)
- Archaeologists: unknown
- Owner: Portuguese Republic
- Public access: Public Colina de Maximinos, Rua dos Bombeiros Voluntários to Rua Dr. Rocha Peixoto

The Roman Thermae of Maximinus (Portuguese: Termas Romanas de Maximinos), are the archaeological ruins of a monumental building and public baths, whose construction was integrated into the urban renewal of the civitas of Bracara Augusta (later Braga), the Roman provincial capital of Gallaecia. The large public/civic construction consisted of a building, housing the baths and a theatre, although the archaeological excavations continue.

== History ==
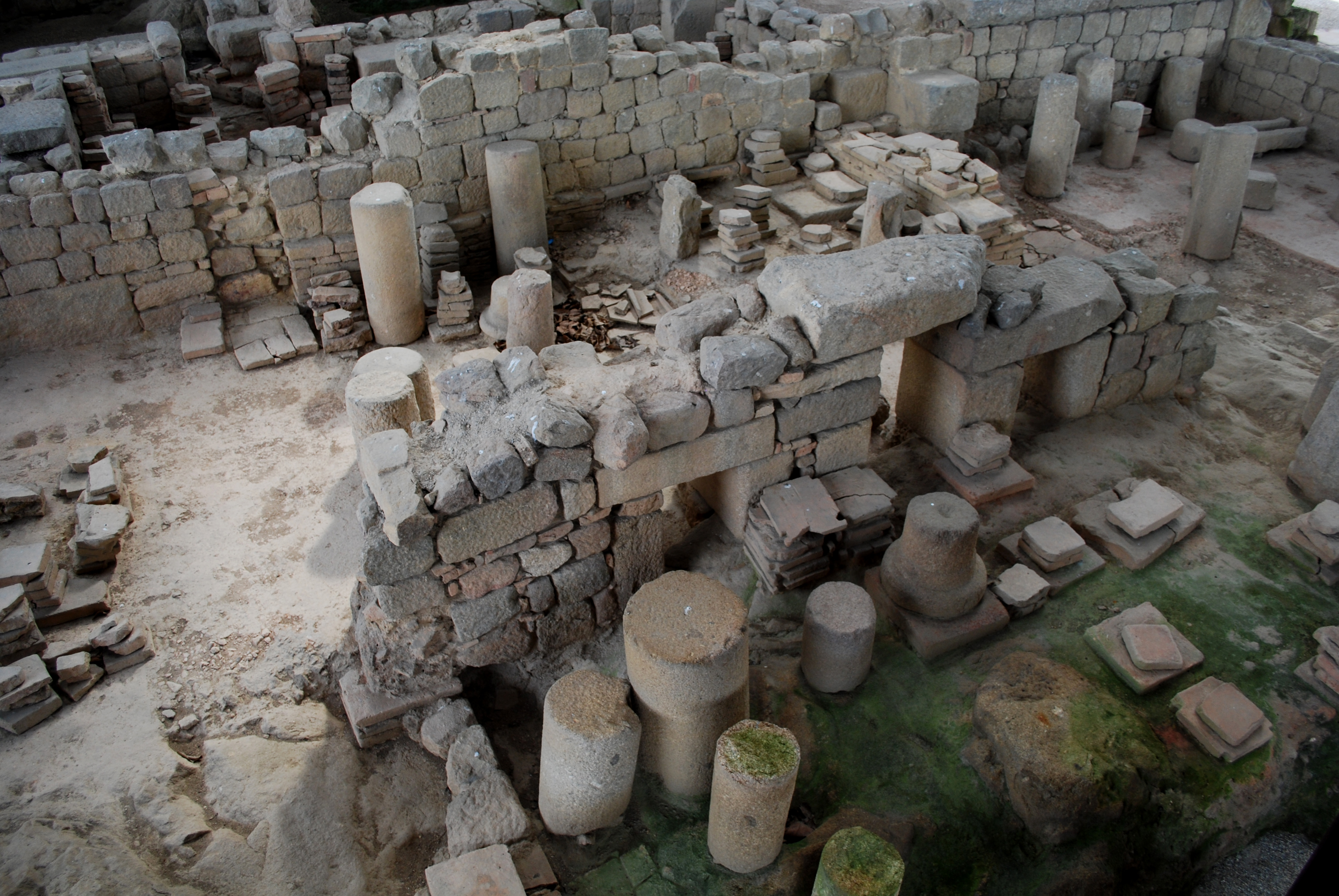
The columns and compartments that support the chambers of the thermal baths

From excavations completed in the region, the thermae complex was constructed in the second half of the 1st century BCE and persisted in some form until the end of the 3rd century. Around the 2nd century, a theatre was constructed. At the end of the 3rd century, the complex was profoundly remodelled, resulting in the substantial reduction in the total area occupied by the thermae; the remodelling of the urban structure was part of the ongoing redesign of Bracara Augusta, into the provincial capital of Gallaecia by Diocletian. This meant that by the 4th century even the theatre was deactivated, and the stones used to construct the city walls. In fact, the remnants encountered confirm the existence of three periods of construction, starting with the first, which corresponds to the pre-thermae period of Julius Caesar and Claudius. The second cycle occurred during the reigns of Flavius and Anthony, represented by the presence of the public baths, which used the pre-existing structure. Finally, the third phase was initially marked by the remodelling of the building, with its courtyard dramatically reduced.

By the 5th century, the building and thermal baths were abandoned.

In 1994, the municipal council of Braga solicited the president of the IPPAR for the help in financing the acquisition of the terrains necessary to construct an archaeological reserve for Colina de Maximinos.

Five years later, during excavations of the site the archaeological team discovered the remains of the theatre.

In 2004, a project under the responsibility of the Câmara Municipal de Braga, supported by the Plano Operacional da Cultura (Culture Operational Plan), was initiated.

Excavations began in August 1977 (when the site was originally discovered), resulting in the early discovery of late hypocausts (channels). Between 1977 and 1980, the designated area was enlarged to include a space of 800 square metres (8,600 ft^{2}). Interventions between 1980 and 1986 were made to specific points throughout the site in order to resolve problems associated with the chronology and architecture of the site.

Between 2005 and 2006, excavations were realized by the UAUM Unidade de Arquelogia da Universidade do Minho (Archeological Unit of the University of Minho) whose intention was to unearth the Roman theatre alongside the site.

== Architecture ==
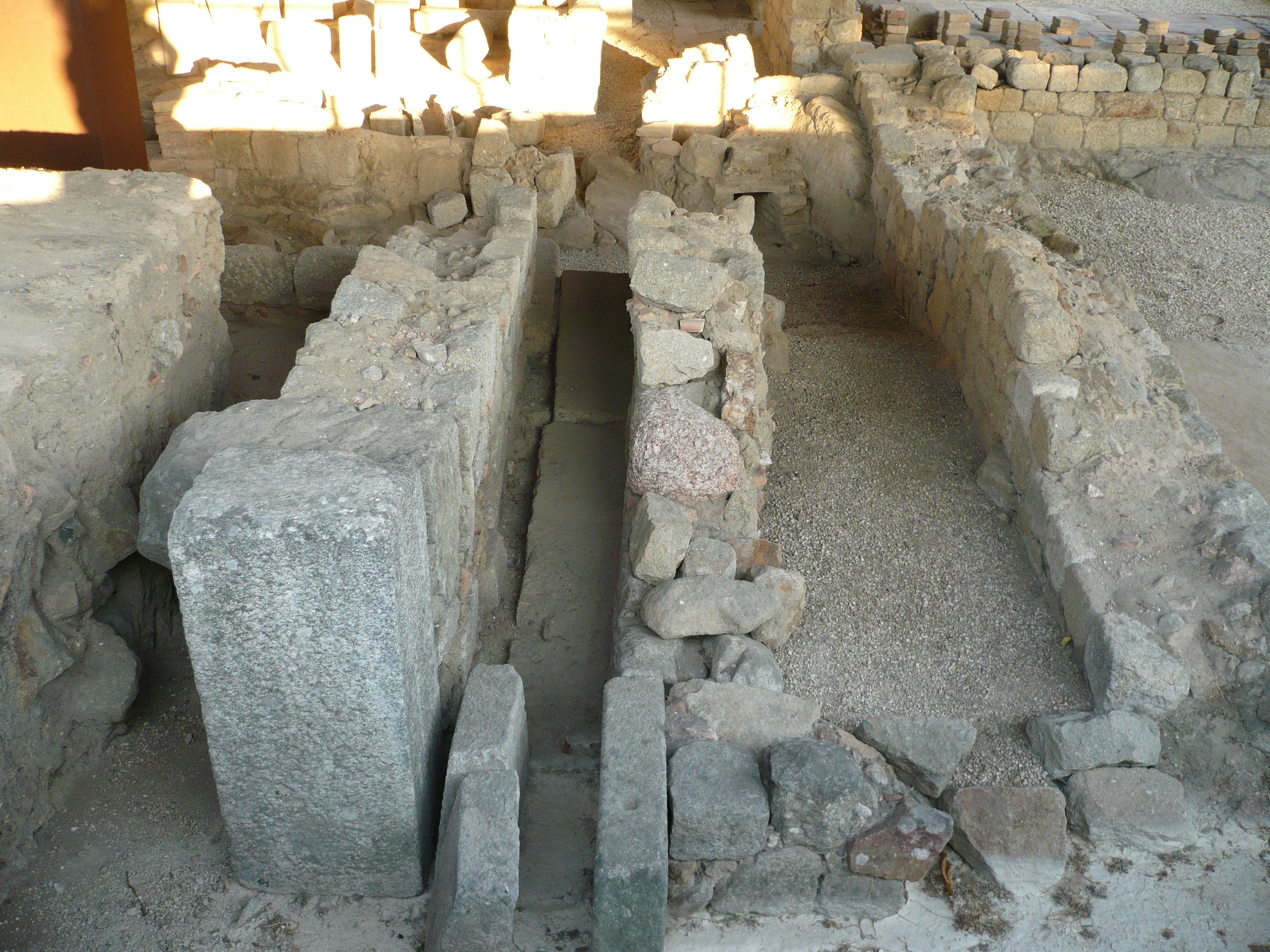
Detail of the water channels supporting the baths

The plan of the building, located on one of the higher hilltops in the municipality of Braga, has not still be completely uncovered.

The complex is of a reasonably large dimension, constructed in the second half of the 1st century, which functioned until the 5th century. Its initial layout included two hot areas and, likely, two areas for autonomous services. These spaces were considerably restricted during the Diocletianic remodelling between the 3rd and 4th centuries.

Following the entrance to the thermae, is the apodyterium (dressing spaces), with natatio (cold pools), before entering the palaestra (gymnasium) or frigidarium (cold baths) followed by tepidarium (warm baths) and caldarium (hot chambers), which were heated by the hypocaust (underground structures formed by arches or pillars, which allowed the circulation of hot air) from the praefurnium (furnace).

The site has not yet been total excavated, resulting in a number of archaeological and temporal questions.

== See also ==
- List of Roman public baths
