= Hunting Baths =

Ancient Roman bath complex

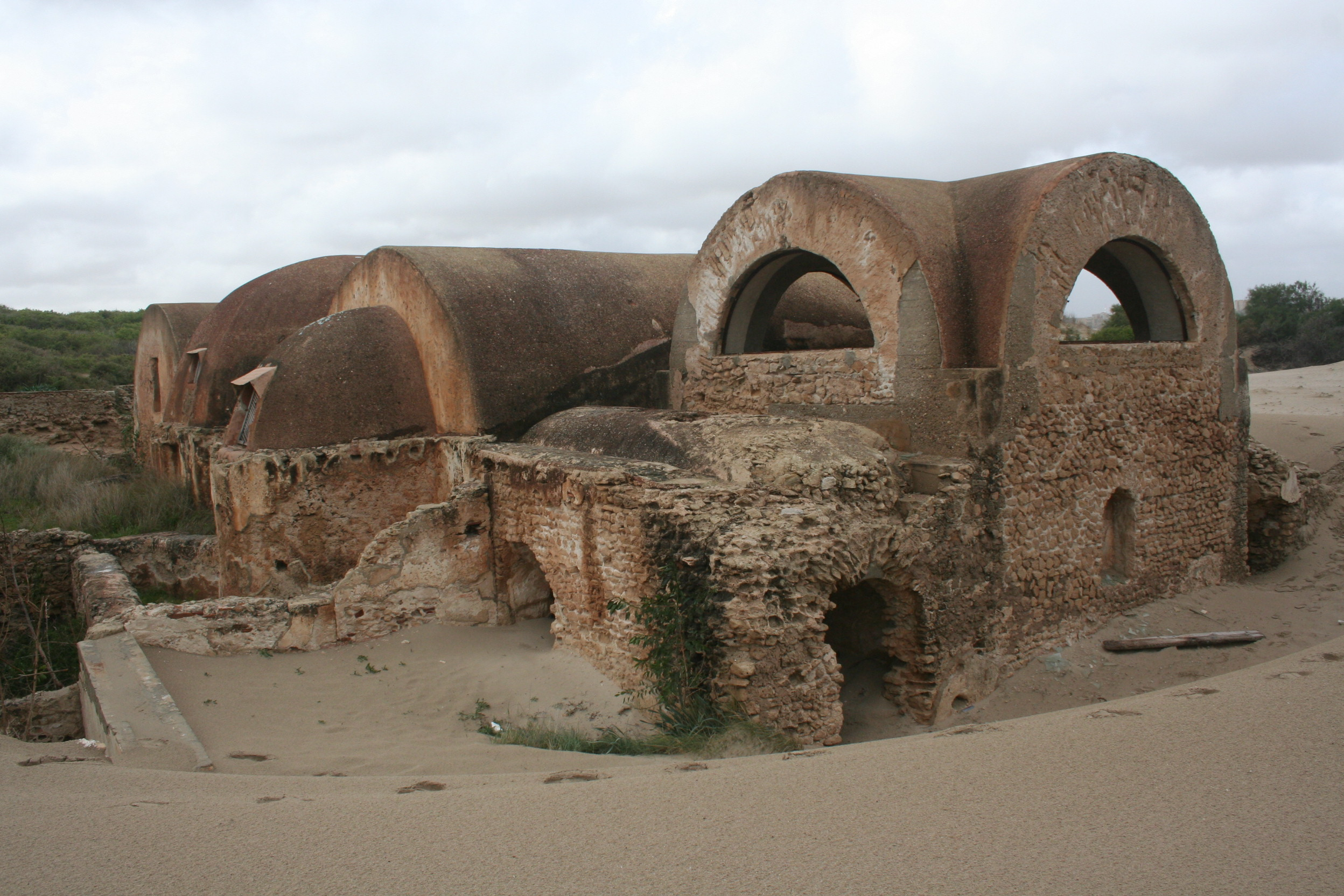
- A view of the Hunting Baths
- Interactive map of Hunting Baths
- Location: Leptis Magna, Libya

The Hunting Baths are an ancient Roman bath complex (thermae) in the ancient city of Leptis Magna, in modern-day Libya. They were built during the reign of the emperor Septimius Severus and are the second major bathing complex in Leptis Magna after the Hadrianic Baths. They have remained in a remarkable state of preservation to the present day, having been buried under sand dunes for much of their history.

== Description ==
The layout of the Hunting Baths follows the general plan established by the Baths of Titus, with the main bathing rooms set out on a single axis that bathers would proceed through linearly. Bathers would first enter into a changing room (apodyterium) through which they could proceed into the first bathing room, the cold room (frigidarium). This room has a barrel vault and contains an apse on either end, and is connected to a cross-vaulted plunge bath on its northeast side. To the southwest of the frigidarium are the warm room (tepidarium) and the anteroom to the hot rooms (caldaria), both of which are covered with octagonal domes. Bathers would have finally proceeded to the twin hot rooms which were both barrel vaulted. The positioning of these rooms, facing south, would have helped to take advantage of the sun's heat in warming the rooms. Farther to the southwest were the water cisterns and furnaces supplying water and heat to the baths. From the outside, this internal structure is clearly visible with the building's vaults and domes being unobscured by walls.

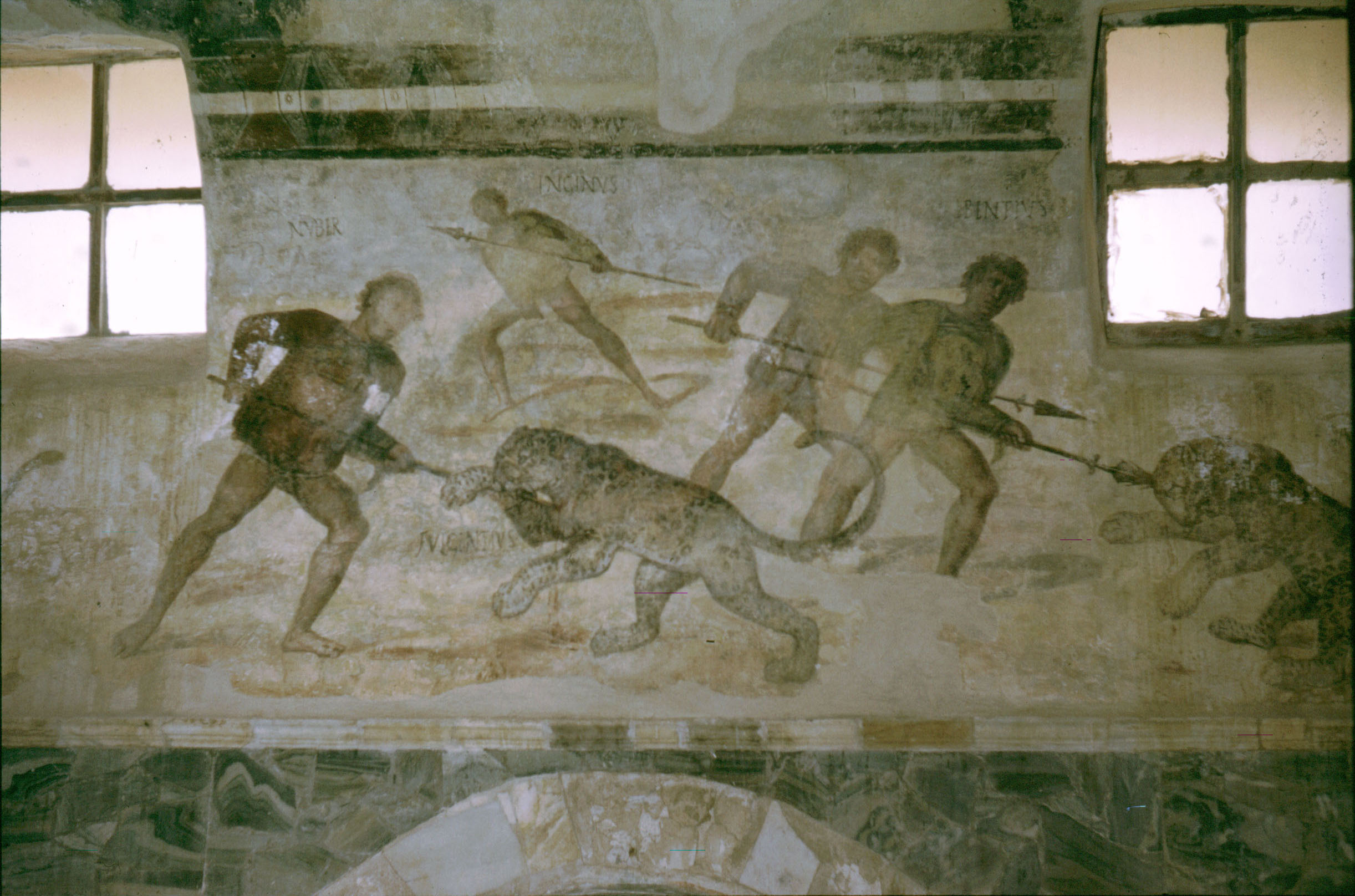
Fresco in the south apse of the frigidarium, depicting leopards being hunted with spears

The baths were richly ornamented, with decorative elements including colored stone covering walls and ceilings and frescoes. One of these frescoes is located in the southern apse of the cold room and depicts a leopard hunt, and is the source of the baths' nickname.

== See also ==
- List of Roman public baths
- Roman Architecture
