= Roman Thermae (Varna) =

Varna's archeological site, Bulgaria

Coordinates: 43°12′01″N 27°55′03″E

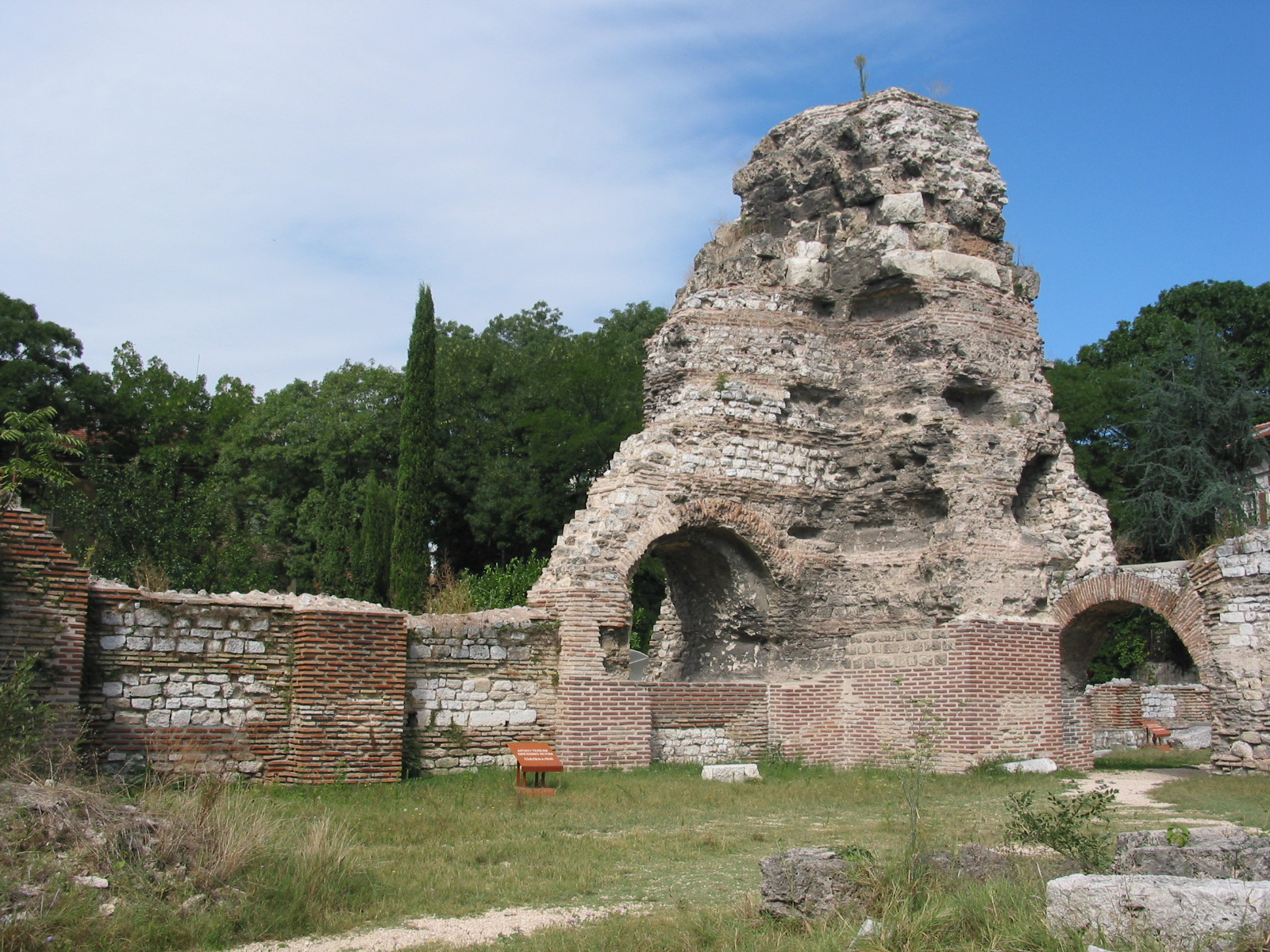
Ruins of the Roman Thermae in Varna, Bulgaria

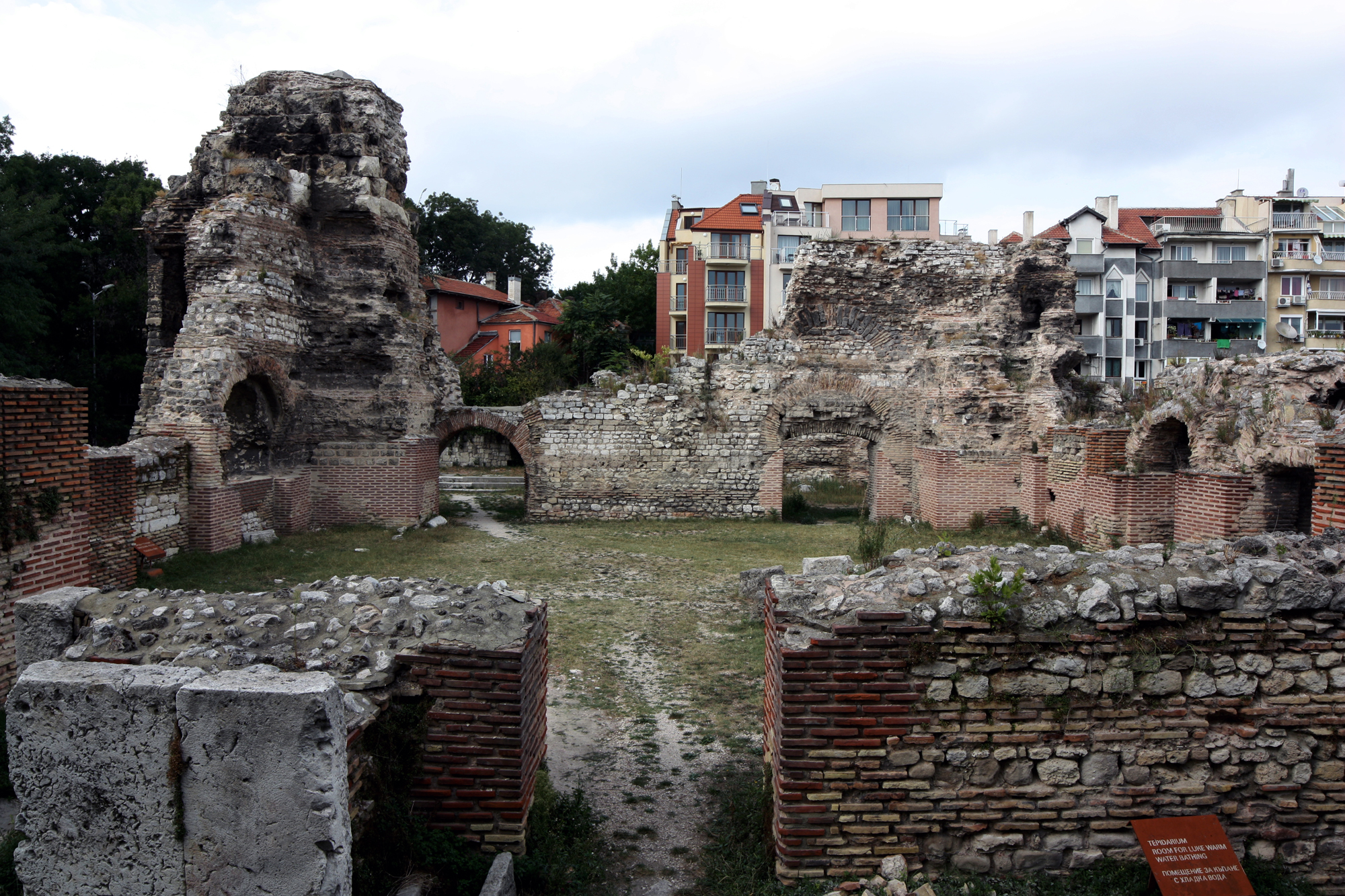
Ruins of the Roman Thermae in Varna, Bulgaria

The Roman Thermae (Bulgarian: Римски терми, Rimski termi) are a complex of Ancient Roman baths (thermae) in the Black Sea port city of Varna in northeastern Bulgaria. The Roman Thermae are situated in the southeastern part of the modern city, which under the Roman Empire was known as Odessus. The baths were constructed in the late 2nd century AD and rank as the fourth-largest preserved Roman thermae in Europe and the largest in the Balkans.

== History ==
Ancient Varna, first a Thracian settlement and then an Ancient Greek colony, became part of the Roman Empire in 15 AD and was assigned to the province of Moesia with a certain degree of local autonomy. The Roman baths of Varna were built towards the end of the 2nd century and remained in use for about a hundred years, till the late 3rd century. Coins of Roman emperor Septimius Severus (r. 193–211) have been discovered among the bath ruins. Much later, in the 14th century, the ruins of the Roman Thermae were the site of craftsmen's workshops.

The ruins were first scientifically recognized as an ancient object in 1906 by the Austro-Hungarian researcher E. Kalinka. The site was further researched by Czech-Bulgarian archaeologist brothers Karel and Hermann Škorpil. Further parts of the ruins were uncovered between 1959 and 1971 by a team under M. Mirchev. In August 2013, Varna Municipality ordered an urgent reconservation project for the Roman Thermae worth 125,000 Bulgarian leva.

== Layout ==
The remains of the Roman Thermae lie in the southeastern part of modern Varna, at the intersection of San Stefano Street and Han Krum Street. They have an area of some 7,000 m^{2} (75,000 sq ft), with the vaults reaching up to 20–22 m (66–72 ft) in height. By area, the Roman baths of Varna are the fourth-largest among the preserved thermae in Europe, behind the Baths of Caracalla and Baths of Diocletian in the imperial capital Rome and the baths of Trier. The thermae are the largest in the Balkan region and the biggest surviving ancient building in what is today Bulgaria.

The Roman Thermae of Varna feature the whole range of facilities including an apodyterium (changing room), a frigidarium (cold pool), a tepidarium (warm pool) and a caldarium (hot pool) as well as a palaestra (a space with social and athletic functions). Heating was provided by means of a hypocaust, an underfloor heating system of pipes.

== See also ==
- List of Roman public baths
