= Għajn Tuffieħa Roman Baths =

Ancient Roman baths in Mġarr, Malta

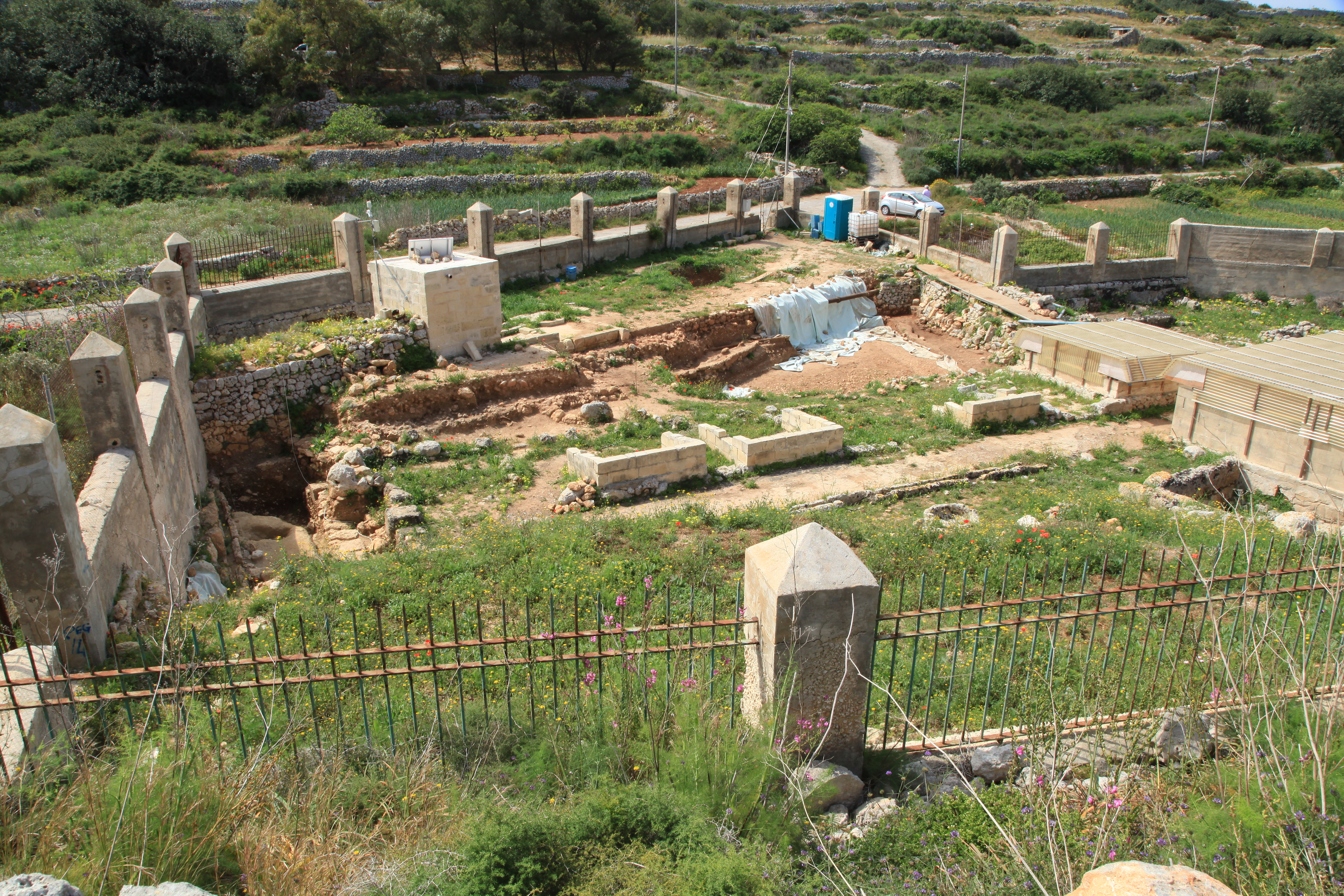
- Location: Għajn Tuffieħa, Malta
- Type: Thermae
- Website: Heritage Malta

The Għajn Tuffieħa Roman Baths were discovered in 1929 during government works to cap a fresh water spring in the area. This spring, or a similar one, might explain why the baths, which needed a constant flow of large amounts of water, were built in Għajn Tuffieħa, Mġarr, Malta.

== Site ==
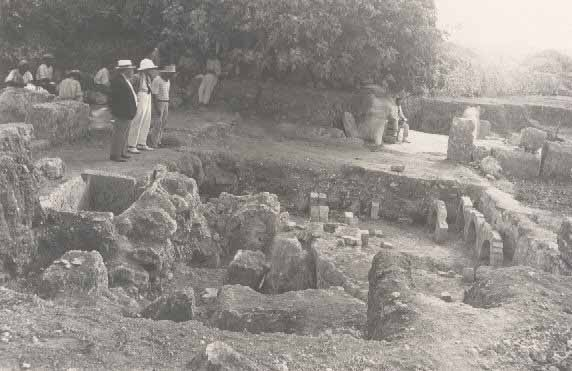
Excavations in the 1930s

One of the many sites excavated under the supervision of Sir Themistocles Zammit, it comprises a number of rooms. These represent the full repertoire seen in other Roman baths, including the tepidarium, frigidarium and caldarium.

There is also a latrine and a corridor connecting small rooms which are usually interpreted to be changing or bedrooms. It is possible that these rooms acted as a dormitory for people visiting the baths as they cannot be connected with any residential remains of the same period.

All the rooms are decorated with intricate mosaics of coloured marbles and stones arranged in geometric designs. The corridors and latrine are, on the other hand, paved with ceramic lozenge-shaped tiles of a length of just fewer than ten centimeters.

== Restoration ==
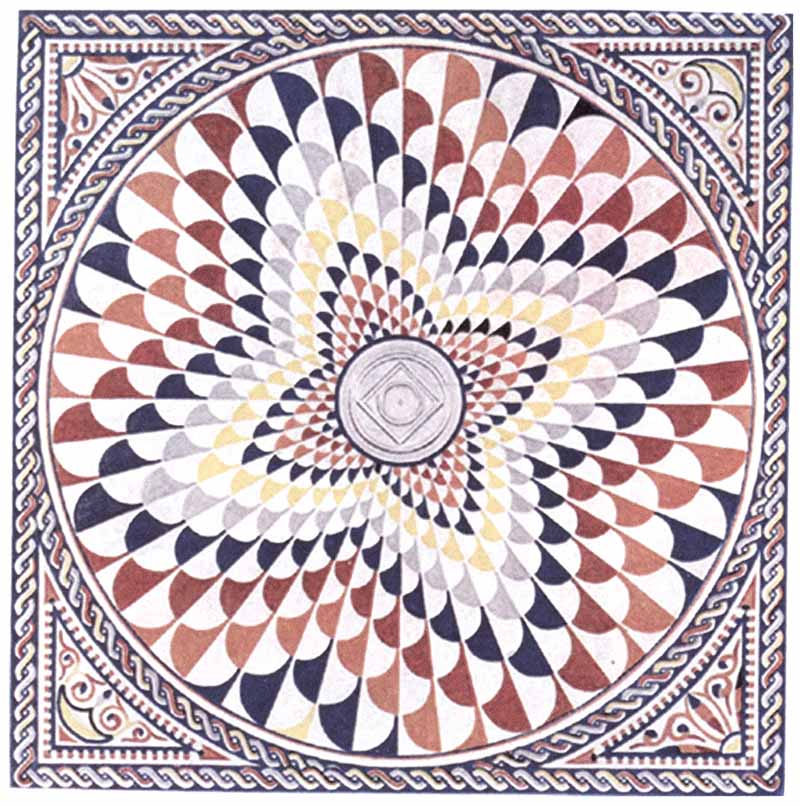
Floor mosaic found at the centre

In 1961, the mosaics underwent restoration sponsored by UNESCO and rooms were built to shelter and protect the remains. The site has also benefited in recent years from the UNESCO funded Malta Mosaics Project, which mapped mosaics and pavements at Għajn Tuffieha and the Domvs Romana. The analysis of this mapping has resulted in a detailed conservation plan which will be implemented in the coming years.

The European Agricultural Fund for Rural Development has granted funds for the study and conservation of the site as part of the 2007 Rural Development Programme for Malta. These funds will help to create visitor facilities and open the site to the public.

== See also ==
- List of Roman public baths
