= Santa Maria dell'Indirizzo, Catania =

Religious building in Catania, Italy

Coordinates: 37.50137°N 15.08616°E

Santa Maria dell'Indirizzo is a deconsecrated Roman Catholic church located on the piazza of the same name in the center of the city of Catania, Sicily, southern Italy. It is affiliated with the Istituto Comprensivo Amerigo Vespucci, a local school, which now occupies the former convent of the Discalced Carmelites monks, with which the church was once associated.

Behind the apse of the church, and better preserved, are the small ruins of an ancient Roman bath (thermae), the Terme romane dell'Indirizzo.

== History and description ==
The thermae behind the church are visible from the street. They appear to date to the late imperial age (3rd – 5th century AD). By the late medieval era, the structures were used as shops or warehouses, and the origin became obscured. Observations by the antiquarian and early archeologist Ignazio Paternò Castello, who lived in the nearby Palazzo Biscari interpreted the structures as a former Roman bath. While small, they seem to contain separate rooms for a caldarium and frigidarium. They are one of various such thermae ruins in Catania.

The church and convent acquired the suffix of Indirizzo or of the direction due to a local legend according to which, in 1610, Don Pedro Téllez-Girón, Duke of Osuna and Viceroy of Sicily, managed to escape a terrible storm thanks to the appearance of a light that would guide him to a safe harbor. To thank the Virgin for this miraculous intercession, the church was erected. In the early 17th century, the land was given to the Carmelite Reformed Fathers, up to that moment stationed in the church of Santa Maria in Mano Santa, located in what is now Piazza Dante.

Presently the church appears externally in a poor state. The church facade is mainly flat and sober, framed by straight pilasters. The main portal is accessed by a double single flight staircases. The side-doors have some of the playful baroque decoration typical of Catanian 18th-century churches.
