= Roman Baths of Ankara =

Ancient thermal complex, Turkey

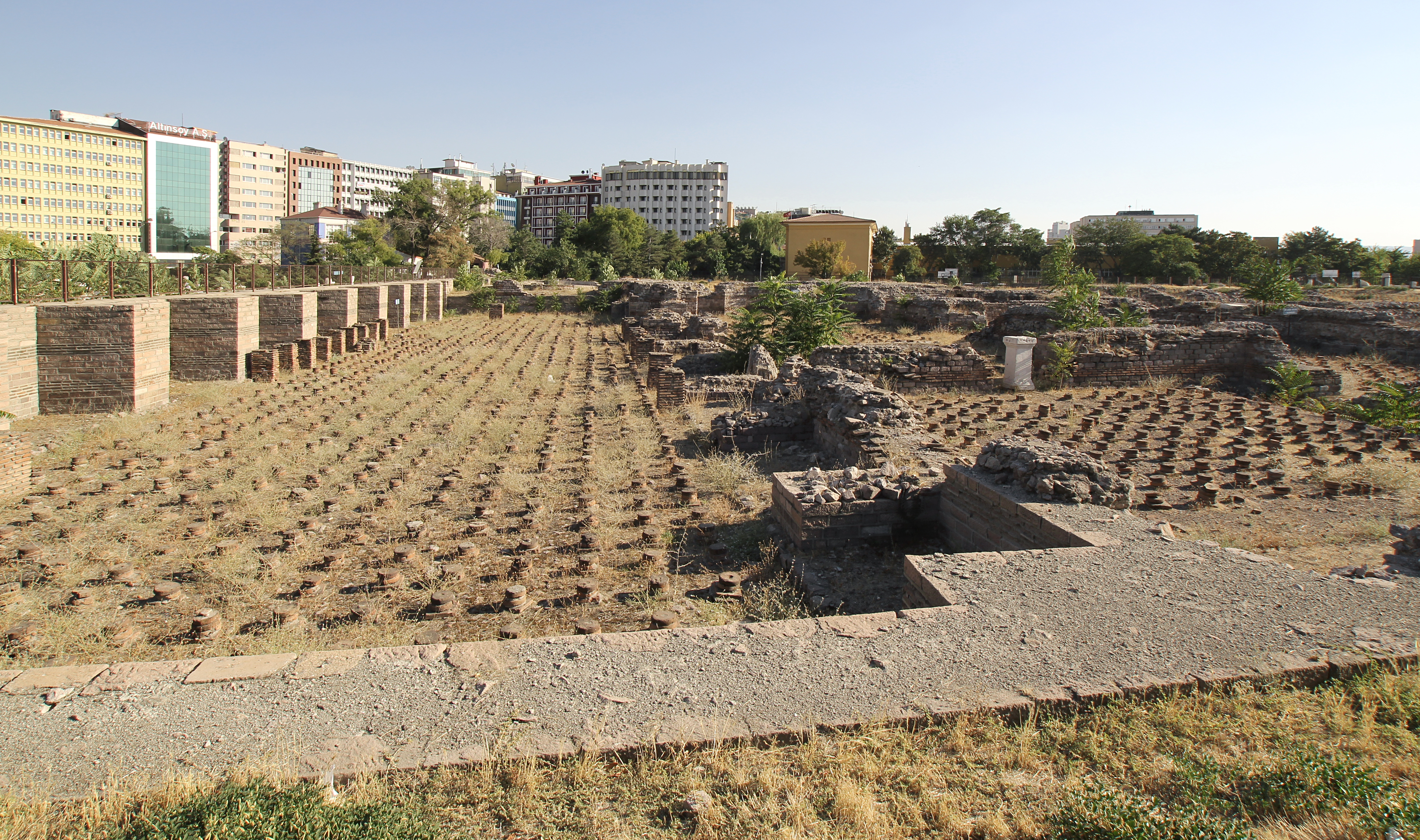

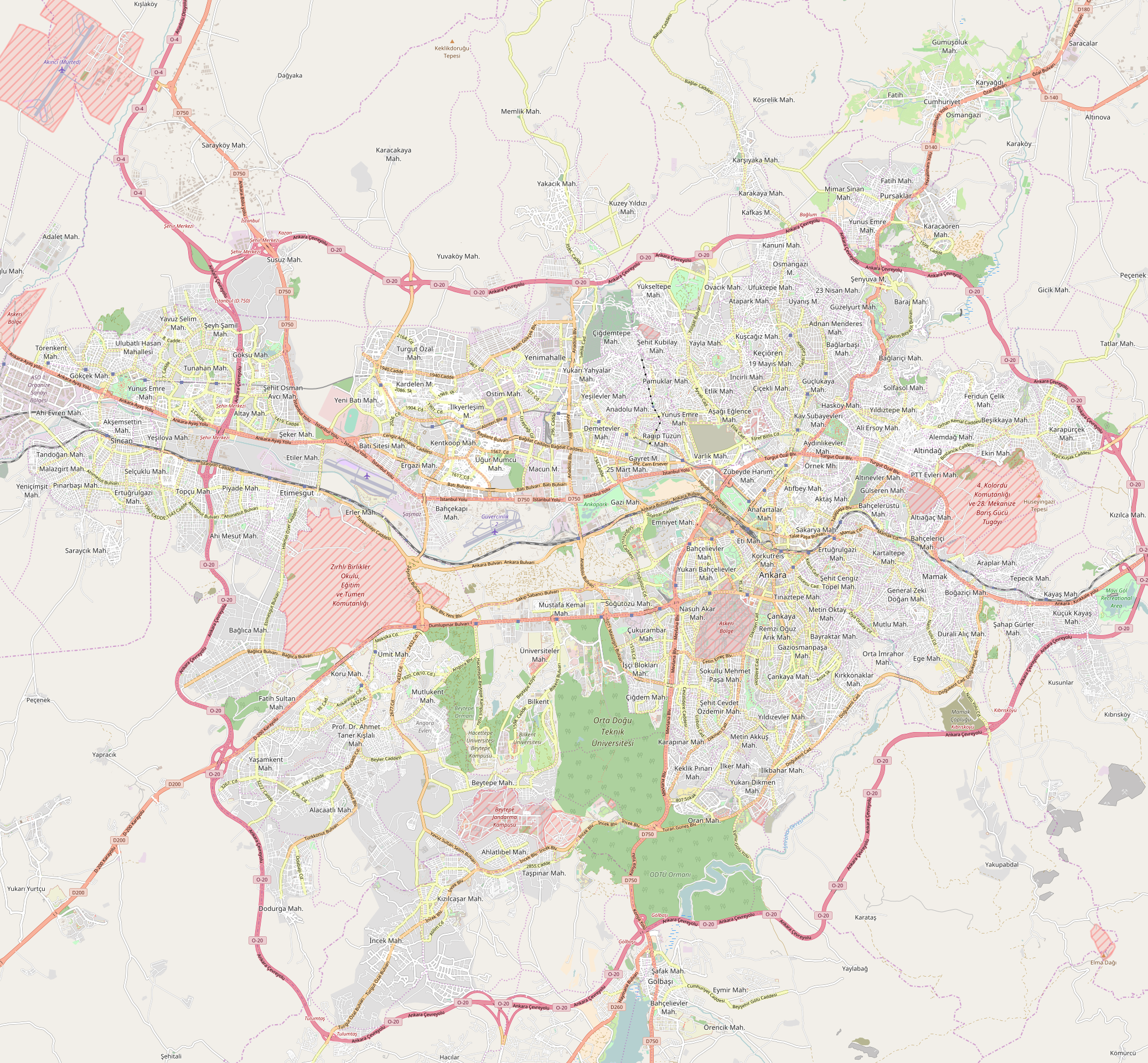
- Location within Ankara

General information
- Architectural style: Roman bath
- Location: Ankara, Turkey
- Coordinates: 39.9465°N 32.853°E

The Roman Baths of Ankara are the ruined remains of an ancient Roman bath complex in Ankara, Turkey, which were uncovered by excavations carried out in 1937–1944, and have subsequently been opened to the public as an open-air museum.

== History ==
The baths are located on a plateau, traditionally known as Çankırı Kapı, which rises 2.5 meters above the west side of Çankırı Caddesi, about 400 meters from the centre of the old Ankara district of Ulus, and has been identified as a höyük (tumulus), with Roman, mixed with Byzantine and Seljuk, material at the top and Phrygian settlement material at the base.

The ancient city of Ancyra (modern Ankara) stood at the crossroads between the East and West and during the Roman period, the city's strategic location led to its rise to prominence as the capital of the province of Galatia. To the east of this plateau ran a roadway from the city's sacred precinct, the area of the Temple of Augustus and Rome, a section of which, flanked by second or third century grey-veined marble columns with Corinthian capitals, was uncovered during the construction of Çankırı Caddesi, during the development of Ankara into the new Turkish capital in the 1930s.

The baths were constructed in the third century by the Roman Emperor Caracalla (r. 198–217), who also constructed the Baths of Caracalla in Rome, in honour of Asclepios, the god of medicine. The baths were in use up until the eighth century when they were destroyed by fire leaving only the ruins of the basement and first floor.

The adjacent höyük (tumulus) was excavated by Prof. Dr. Remzi Oğuz Arık in 1937 revealing the Phrygian and Roman remains. General Director of Museums Hamit Z. Koşay and field director Necati Dolunay administered further excavations, funded by the Türk Tarih Kurumu (Turkish Historical Society), which revealed the bath buildings in 1938–1939 and fully exposed them in 1940-1943. Excavation's architect Mahmut Akok investigated and drew a reconstructed plan of the baths before their restoration was begun.

Prof. Dr. Arık was able to date construction of the baths to the reign Caracalla by coins found during the excavations supported by contemporary inscriptions, whilst further coins indicated the baths were in continuous use for about 500 years, undergoing repair from time to time.

== Layout ==
The site is entered via the ticket office on Çankırı Caddesi which opens out onto the old palaestra (wrestling court), which was surrounded by a portico with 128 marble columns (32 on each side) now ruined and is home to a display of tombs, gravestones, altars and other inscriptions from the Roman, Byzantine and late Hellenistic periods.

Behind the palaestra the apodyterium (dressing room) and the three bath chambers, caldarium (hot bath), tepidarium (warm bath) and the frigidarium (cold bath), are laid out in a typical design. The abnormally large dimensions of the tepidarium and caldarium has been put down to the popularity of these warmer areas during the city's cold winters. The most prominent surviving features are the brick columns which supported the floor and around which air heated in underground ovens was circulated to warm the rooms above.

The remains of the columned roadway are visible to the north of the palaestra.

== Gallery ==
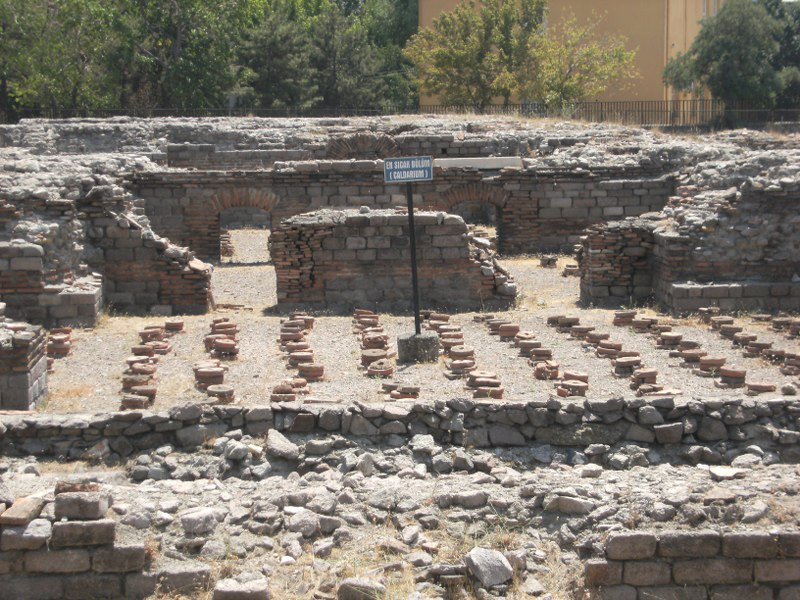
Caldarium

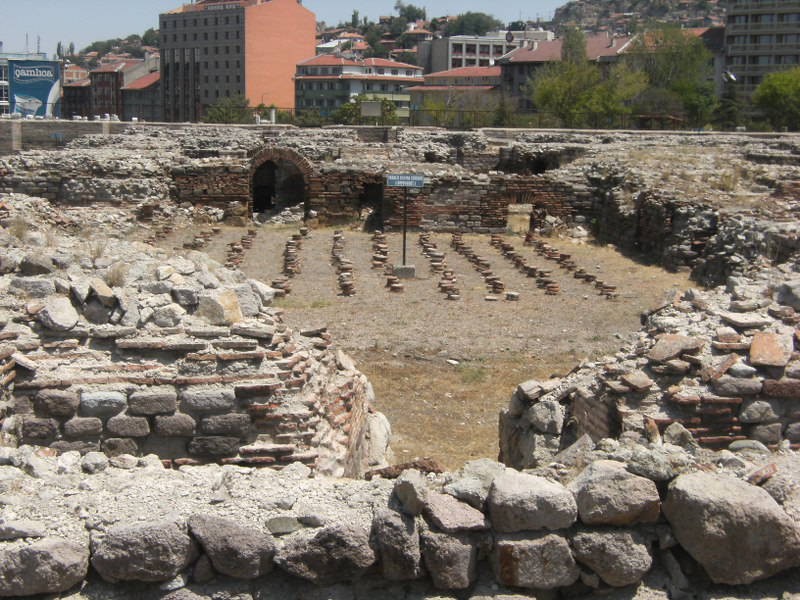
Hypocaust

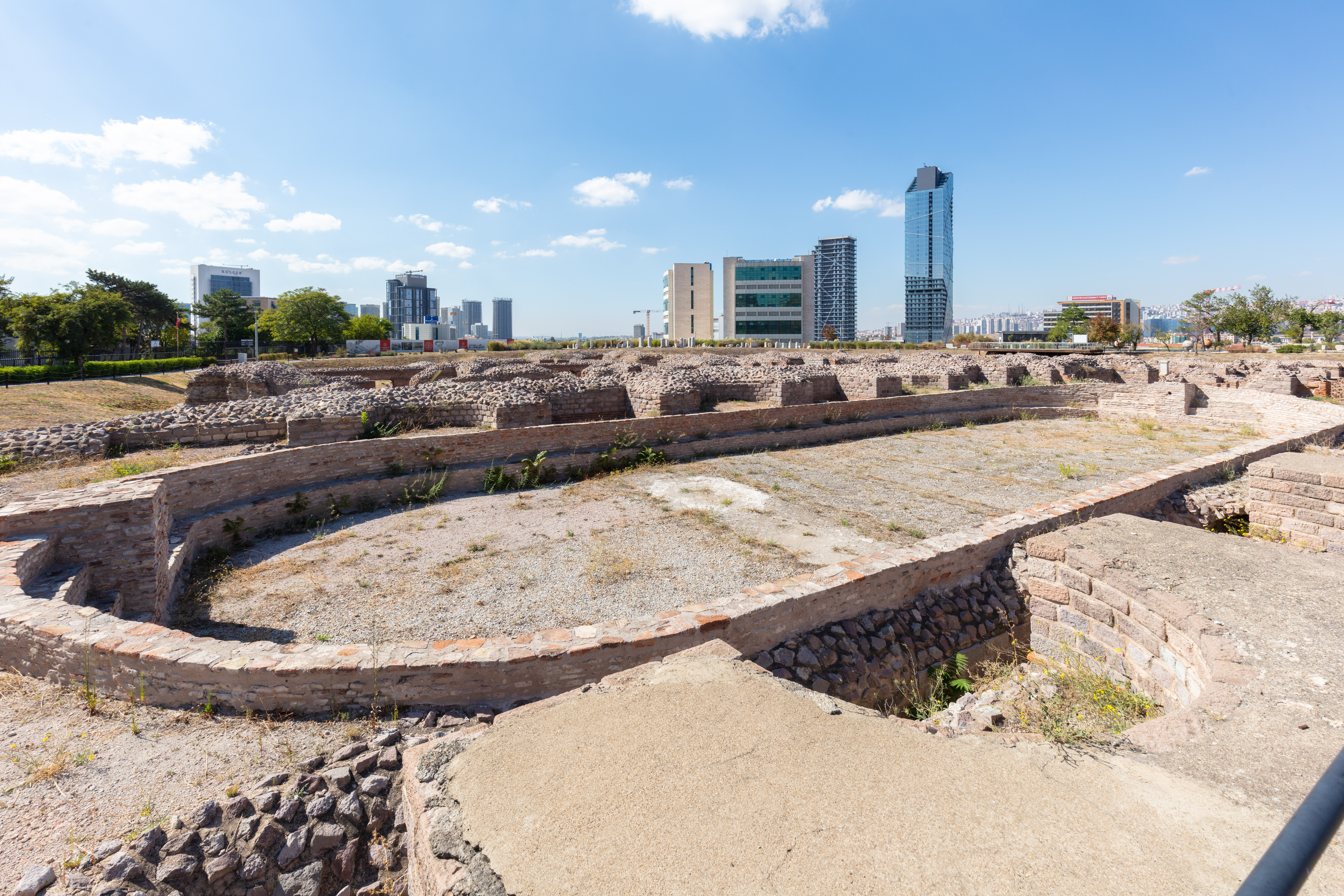
Piscina

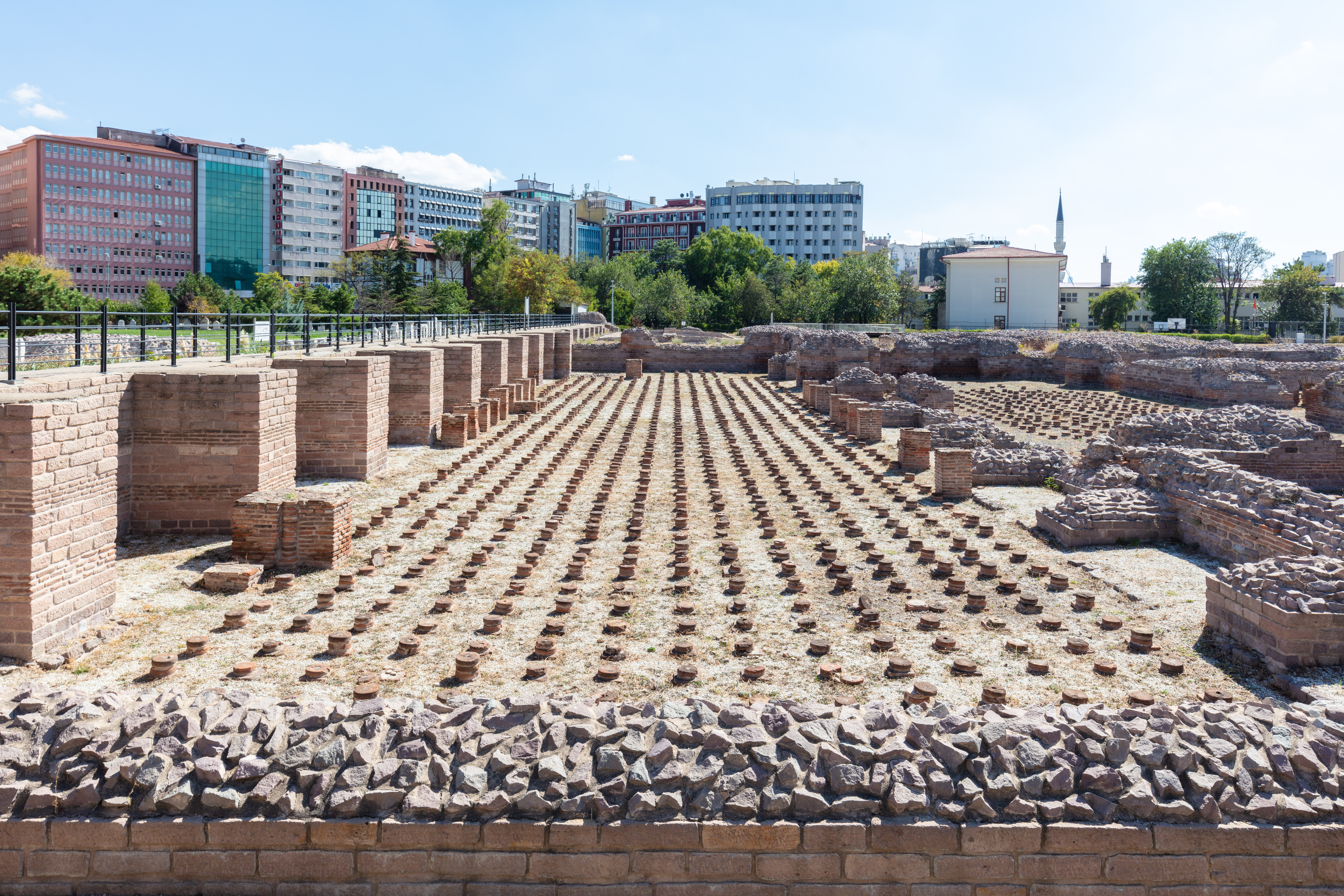
Tepidarium

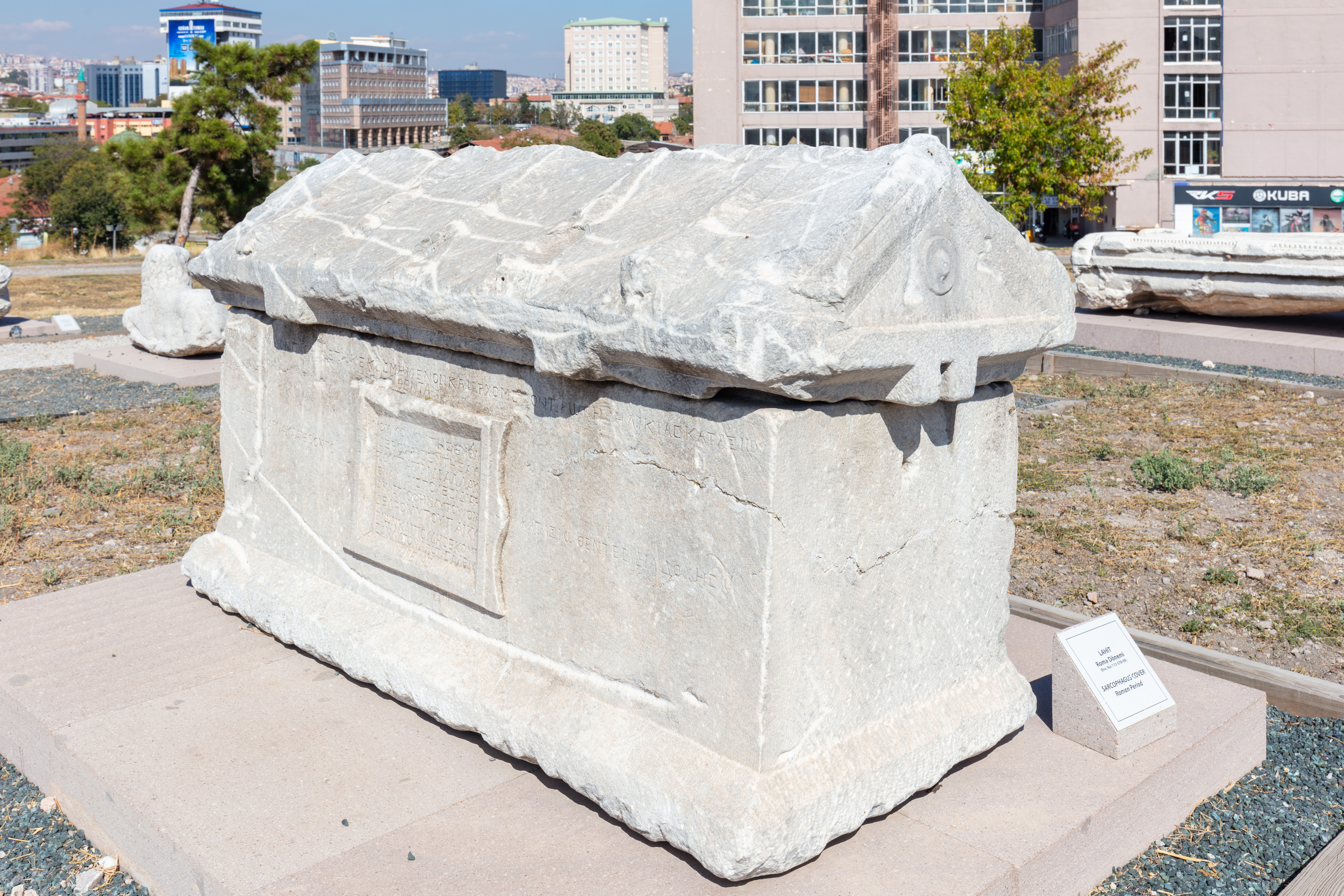
Sarcophagus

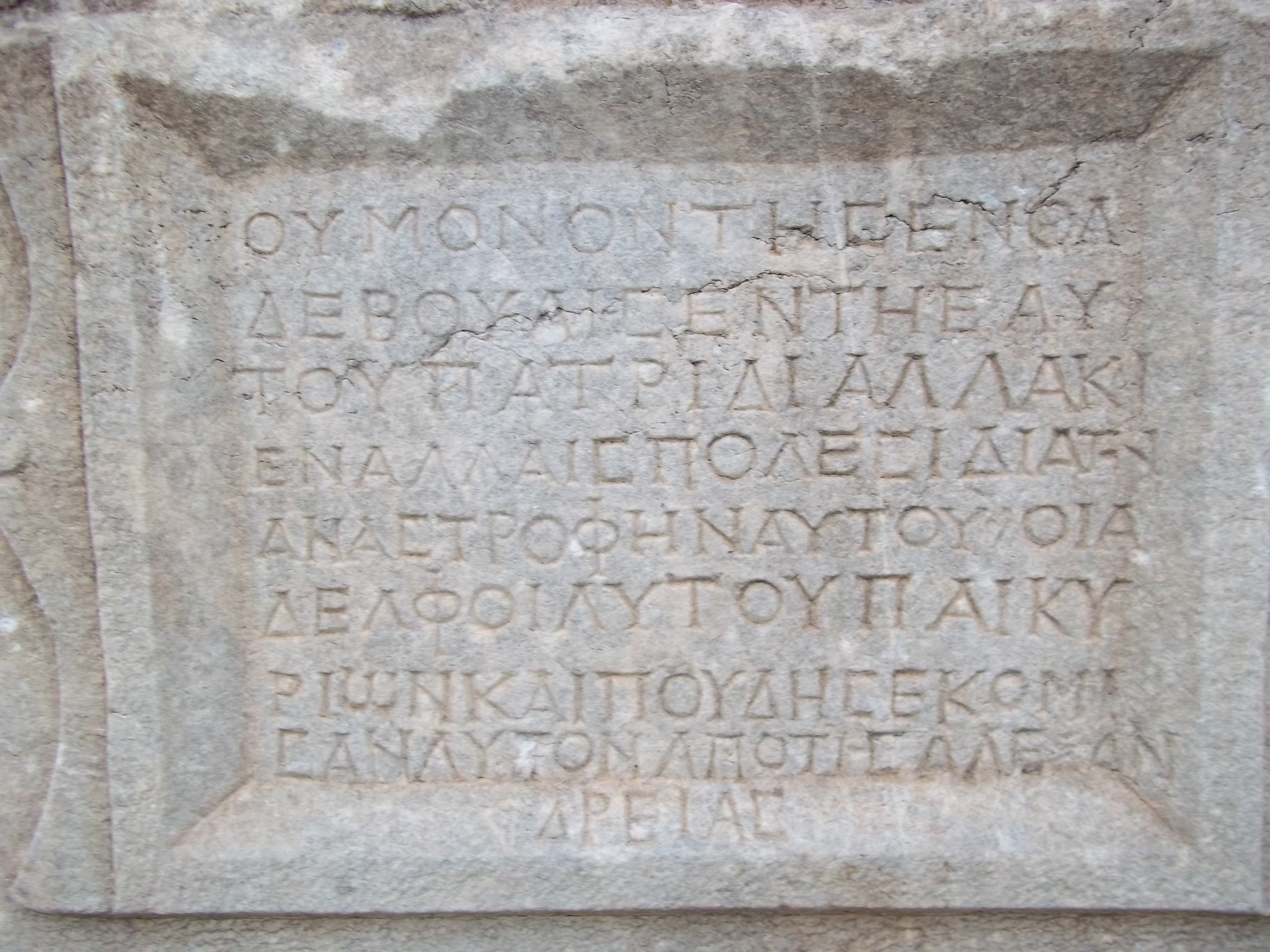
Sarcophagus's inscription

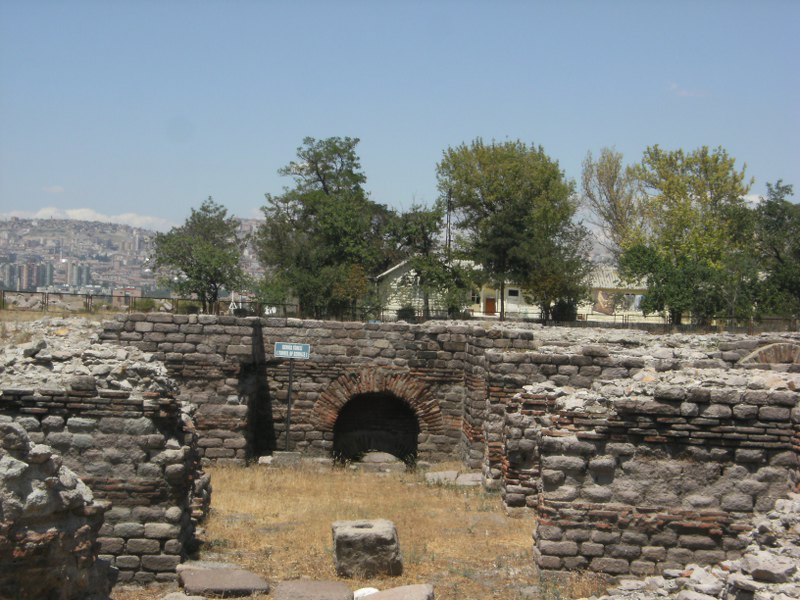
Tunnel of service

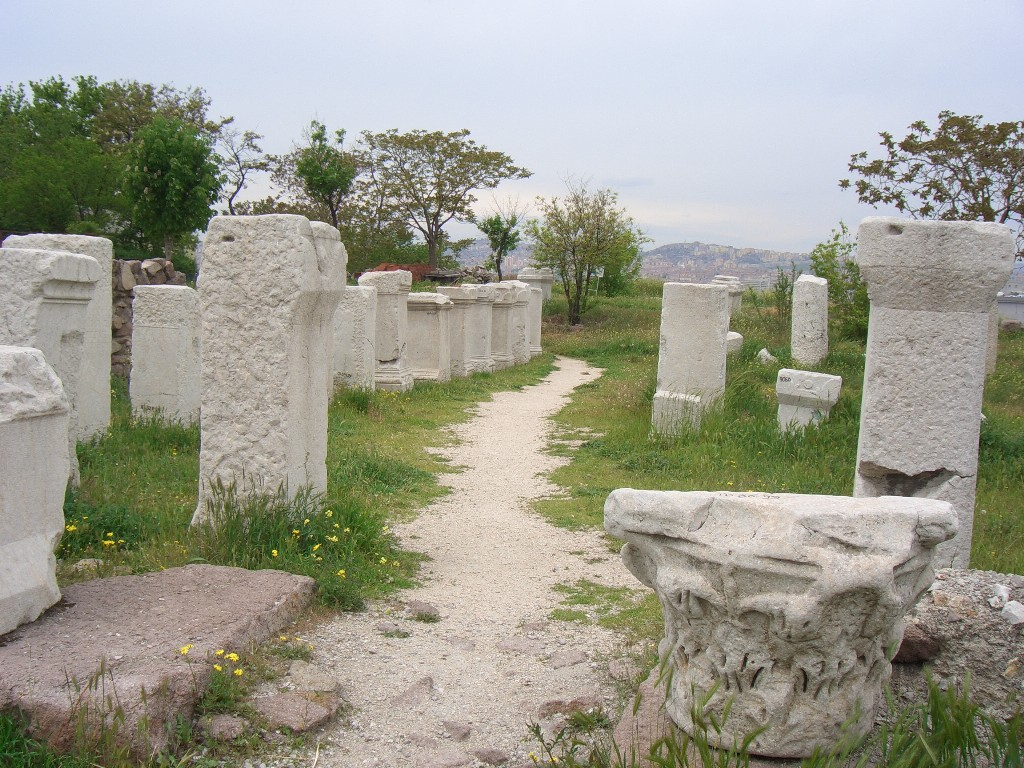
Column capitals and Roman tomb inscriptions scattered around the Roman Bath in Ankara.

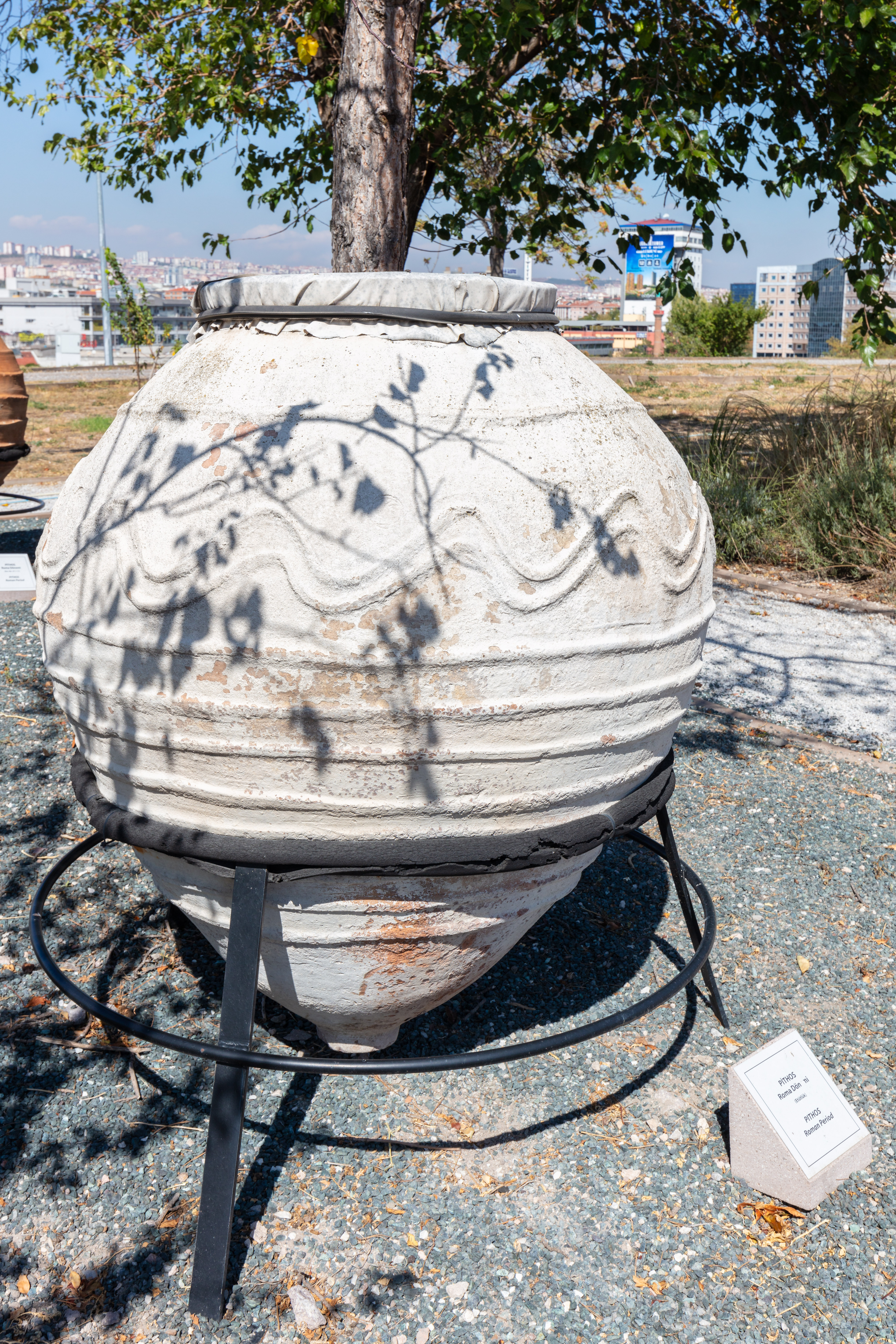
Roman vase

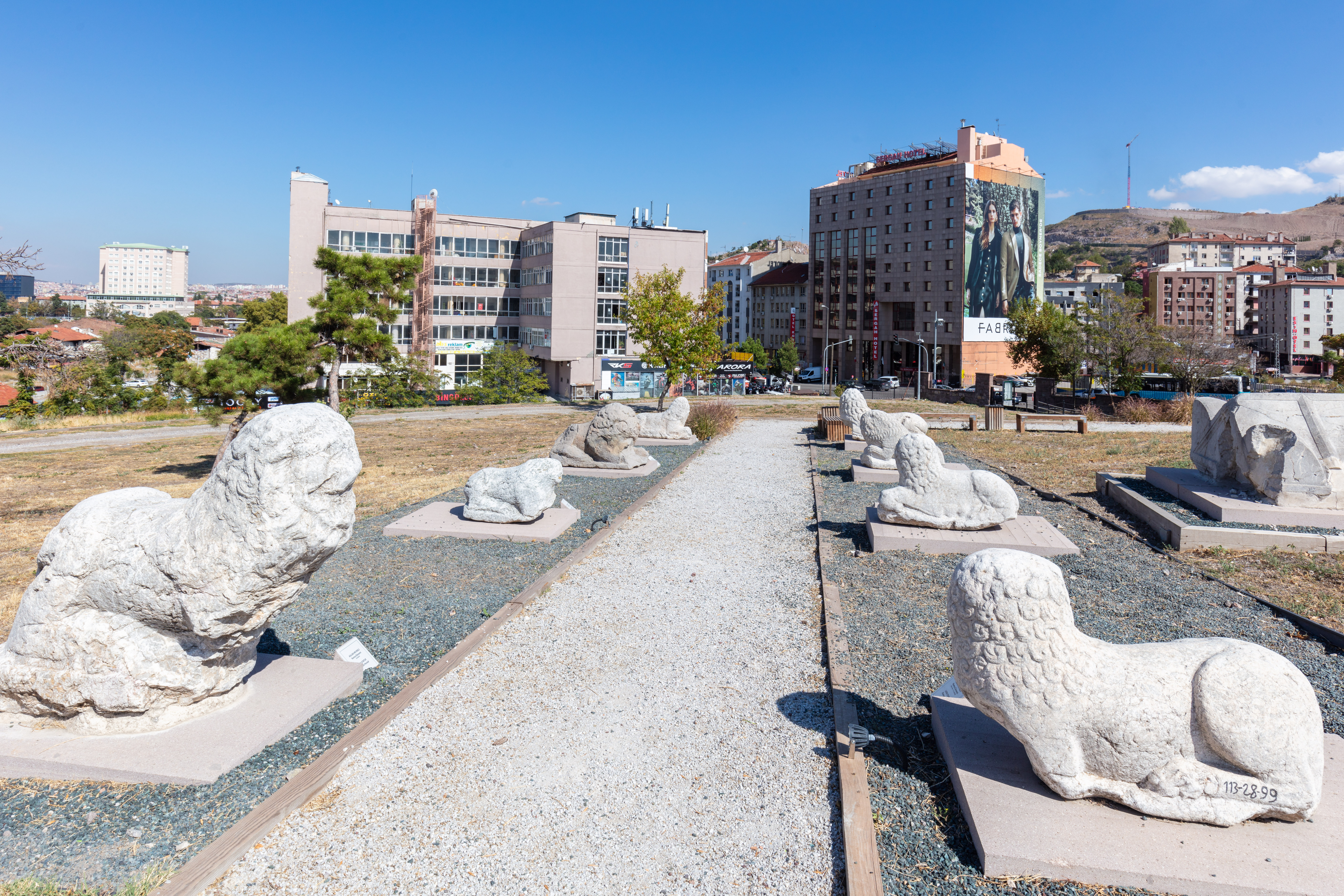
Avenue of lions

== See also ==
- List of Roman public baths
