= Licinian Baths =

Coordinates: 36.422°N 9.219°E

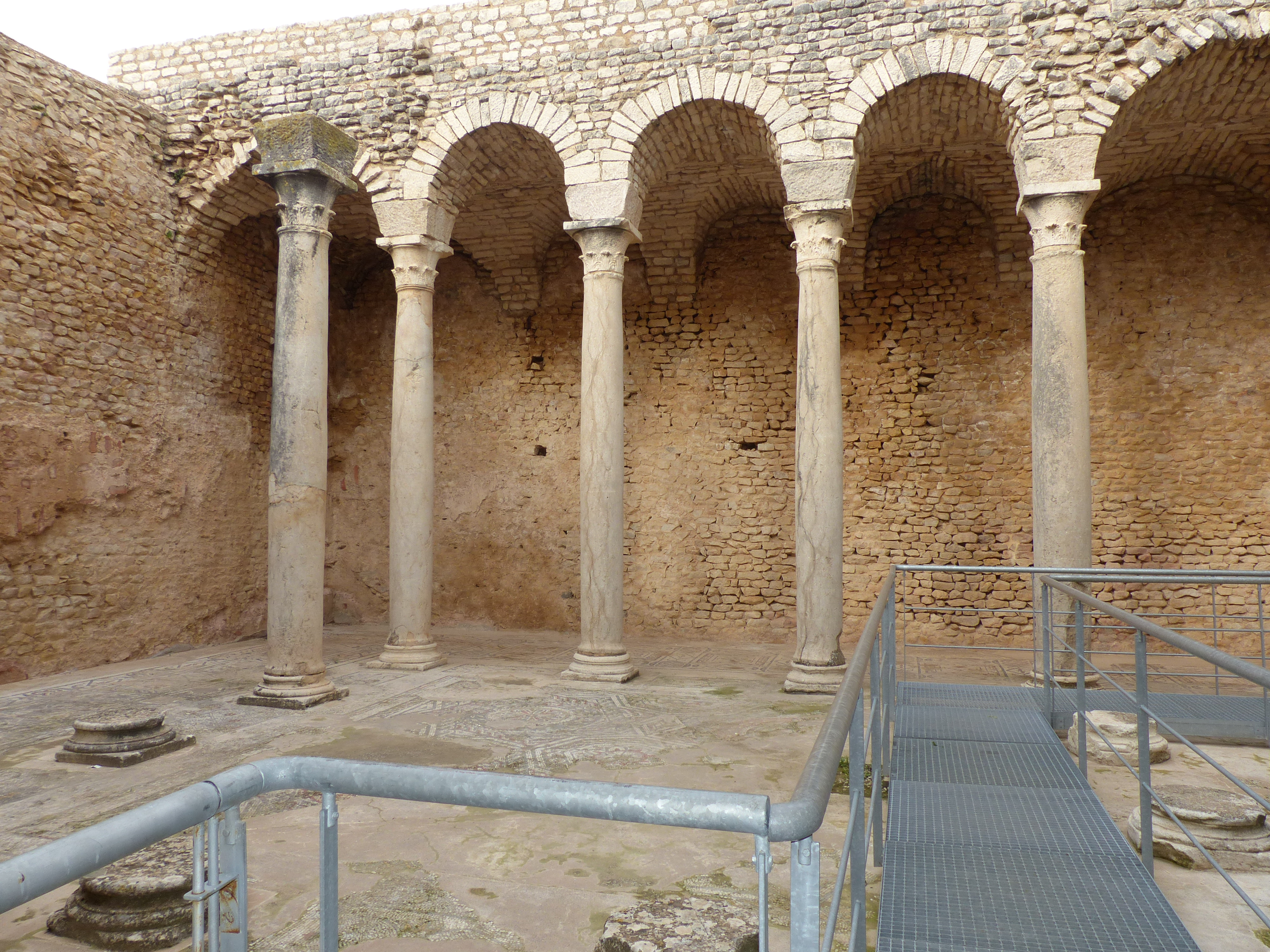
The Licinian Baths

The Licinian Baths (Arabic:حمام كارك) are a classified monument in the city of Beja in the north-west of Tunisia. Located in the ruins of the ancient settlement of Dougga, they represent one of the most important thermal establishments in Roman Africa.

== History ==
The baths were donated to the city by the Licinii family in the 3rd century, during the reign of Caracalla, between 212 and 217. They were primarily used as winter baths.

The baths were classified as a national monument by the National Heritage Institute on 16 November 1928.

== Architecture ==
The baths' walls are well preserved today. Also, the tunnel that the baths' slaves used to circulate through is still present in a good situation.

The frigidarium has triple arcades at both ends and large windows with views over the valley beyond.

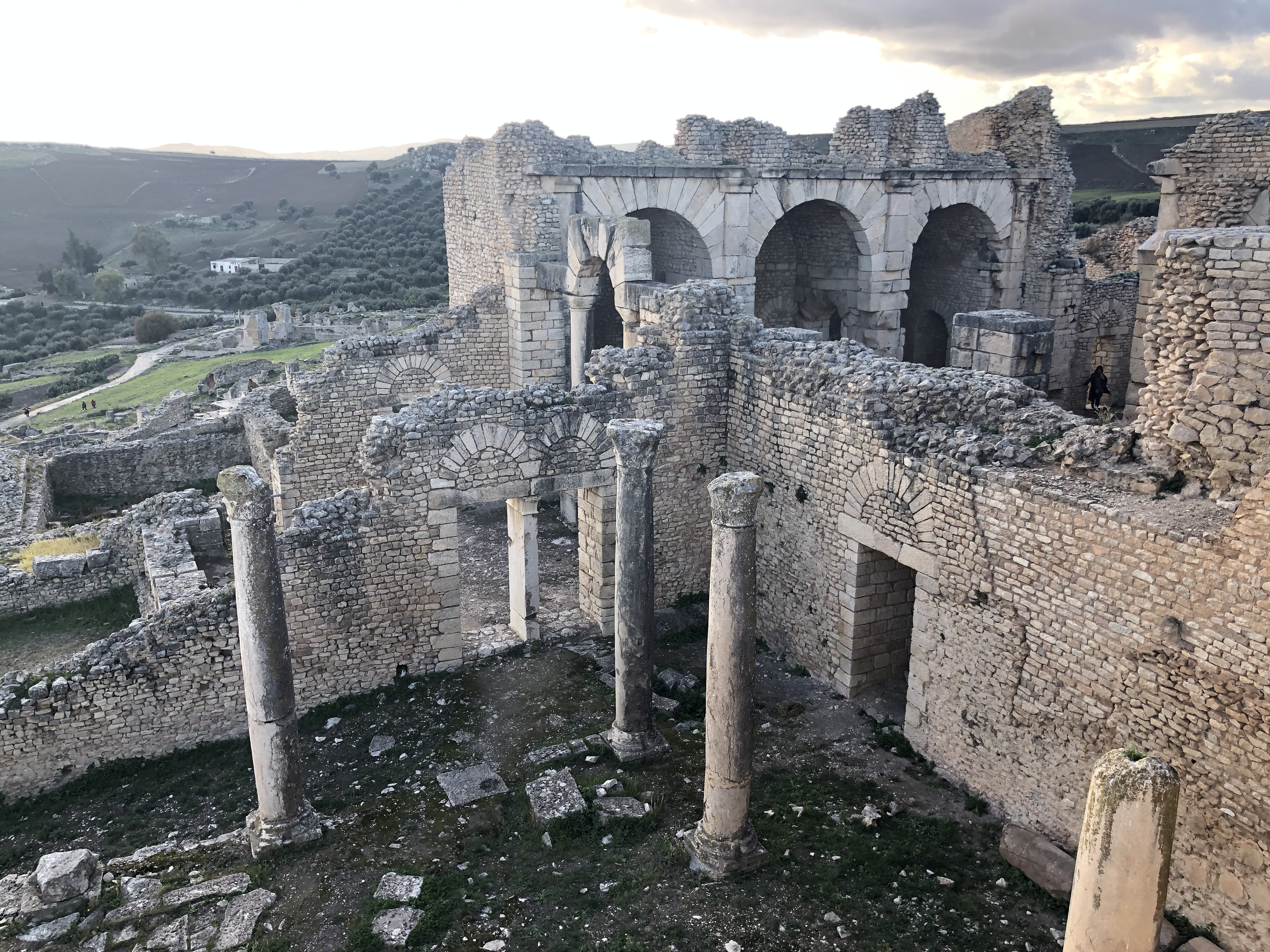
View of the baths

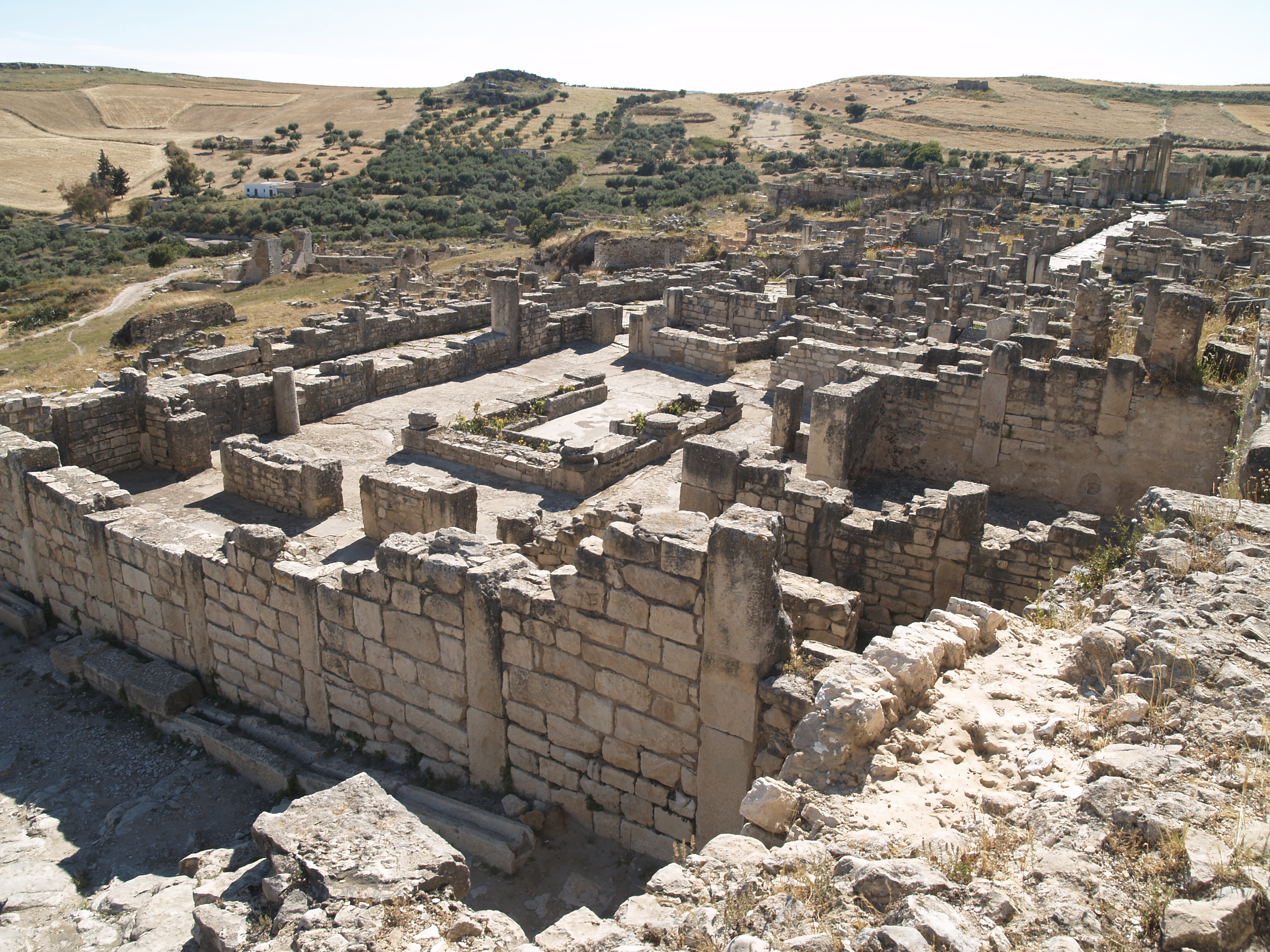
Residential ruins near the Licinian Baths

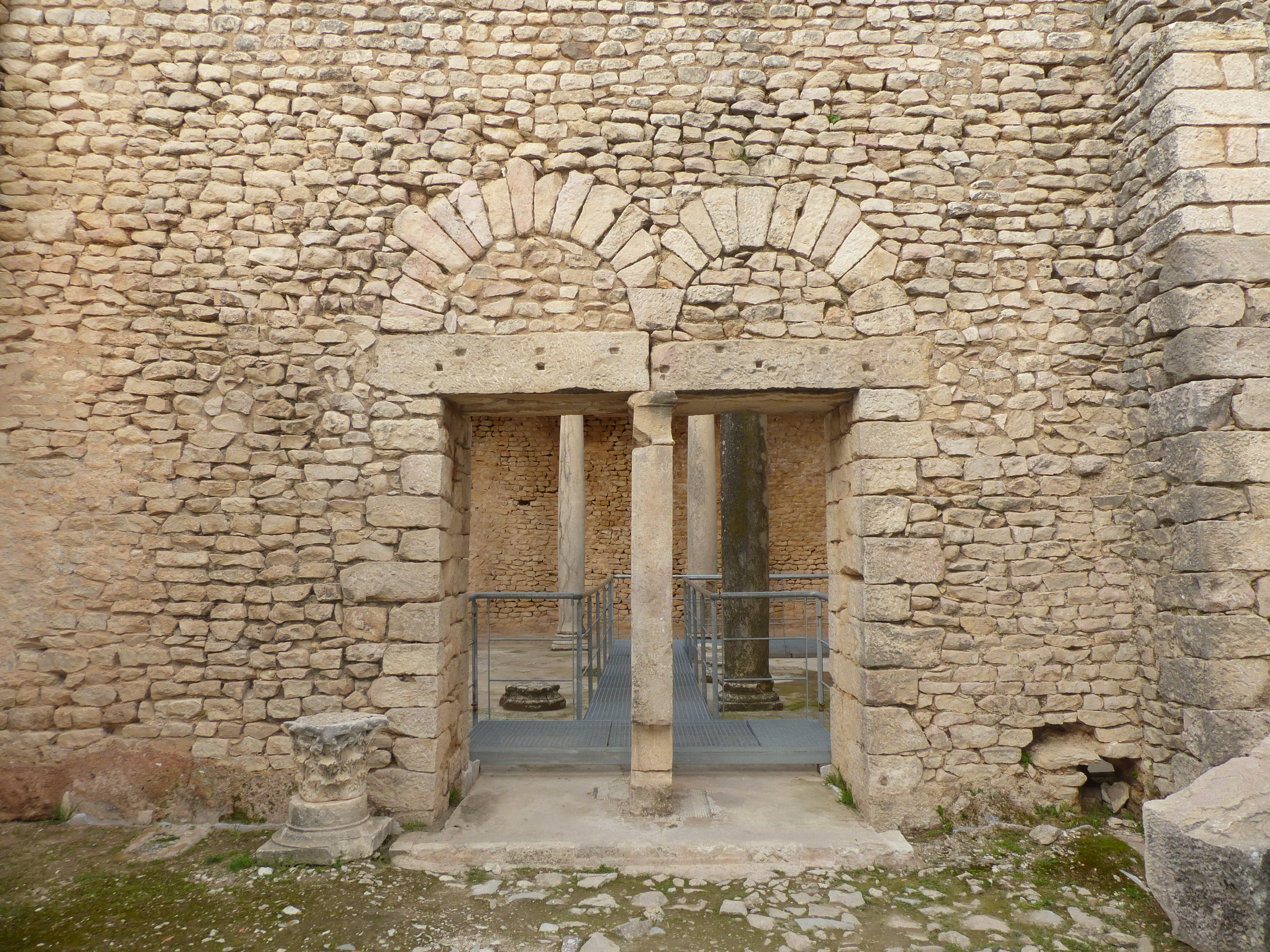
Entrance of the baths
