= Archaeological Garden of the Hospital of Lisieux =

French public garden

Archaeological garden of the Hospital of Lisieux
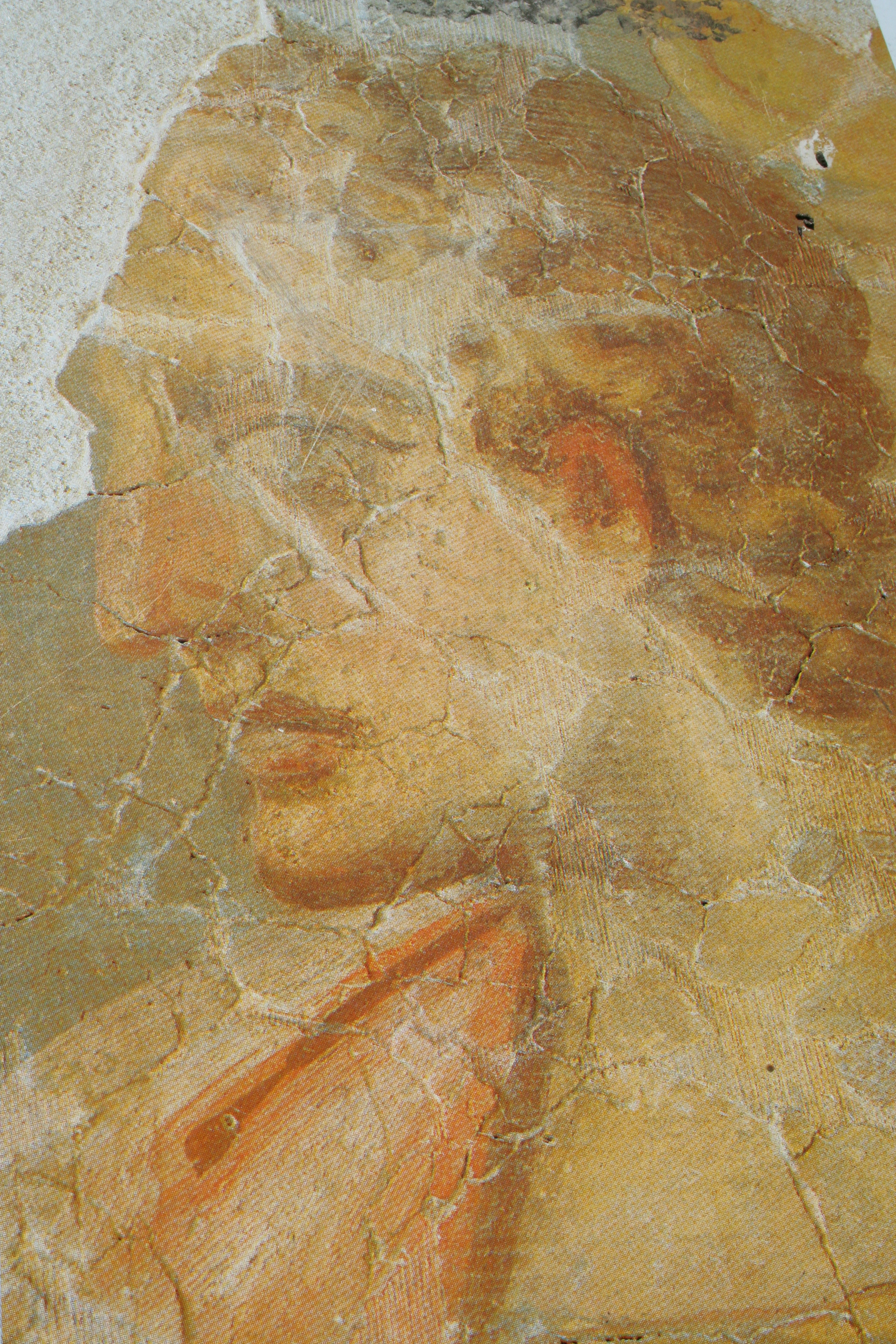
- Portrait of a muse, a fresco from the Roman period discovered on the site during excavations of the tepidarium.
- Interactive map of Archaeological garden of the Hospital of Lisieux
- Location: Lisieux, Calvados
- Coordinates: 49°08′46″N 0°13′48″E
- Type: Garden, Roman baths, archaeological site, Roman archaeological structure
- Classified MH (1987, Ruins)

The archaeological garden of the hospital is a public garden located near the Robert-Bisson Hospital in Lisieux, France, in the Calvados department (Normandy). The Gallo-Roman remains on display were uncovered during archaeological excavations led by Claude Lemaître, carried out from 1978 to 1985, and include a thermal bath building and a private structure. Archaeologists could trace the history of this neighborhood from the 1st century to the 3rd century.

During the excavations, a rich and high-quality painted décor was discovered—"an excellent testimony to Roman painting in Gaul in the 2nd century." (Note: Decaens 1982, p. 310) Figured representations similar to those found at this site are exceptional, with fewer than six sets of this quality known in Gaul as of the mid-1990s.

== History ==
In February 1967, during the construction of the boiler room (Note: de Boüard 1980, p. 369) for the new Robert-Bisson hospital center, important remains of Roman buildings were fortuitously discovered but not preserved, except for two altars and sculpted elements uncovered during emergency excavations and surveys conducted in February–March. (Note: de Boüard 1968, p. 362) Unfortunately, this excavation made it possible to "measure the extent of the destruction already done."

Due to the discovery of a large block of stone and sculpted elements, the excavators first thought they had found a public building. (Note: de Boüard 1968, p. 365) At this point, significant fragments of painted plaster of a quality superior to anything previously found in the region were discovered, including fragments of Pompeian red plaster and other elements that had belonged to particularly elaborate decorative panels. (Note: de Boüard 1968, pp. 364–365) The first ceramic elements found date to the 1st and early 2nd centuries.

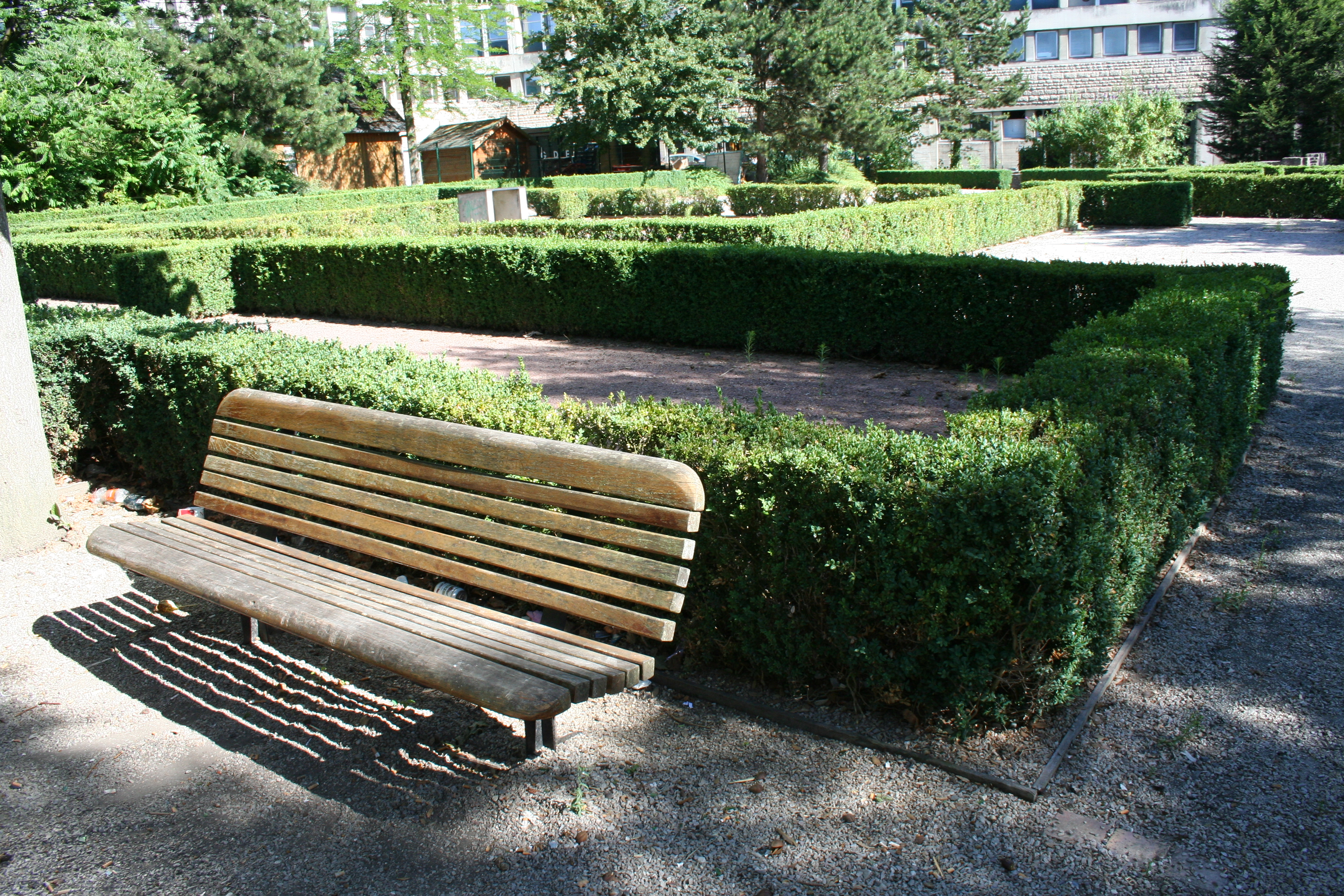
View of the garden in 2010.

Claude Lemaître was able to make a few observations in January 1971. (Note: de Boüard 1972, p. 338) In 1977, trial trenches were dug on a nearby plot.

Excavations were conducted nearby from 1978 to 1979 for the private building and from 1978 to 1982 for the bath complex. (Note: Delacampagne 1990, p. 101) The excavation campaigns, financially supported by the National Archaeological Excavation Association, continued until 1984–1985 (Note: Pilet 1986, p. 338) and were led by Claude Lemaître and Michel Batrel.

The preservation of the remains was supported by the city of Lisieux and the Calvados department. The painted remains were entrusted for study and restoration to the Centre d’étude des peintures murales romaines in Soissons. Researchers sorted approximately ten tons of rubble, resulting in the identification of nearly 25 painted plaster panels.

However, Alix Barbet noted in 2008 that the excavation of the villa had never been published. (Note: Barbet 2008, p. 309) Today, the site is a little-frequented public garden located right next to the hospital. The remaining walls of the dwelling have been reinforced, while low hedges mark the layout of various rooms in the baths. This discovery nonetheless represents the most important Gallo-Roman dwelling known in the city.

== Location ==
Sketch of the ancient ruins in the hospital garden.

The city of Noviomagus Lexoviorum is located 28 km from the sea. (Note: Cottin 1956, p. 170) As the capital of the Gallic people known as the Lexovii, the original settlement was at a place called “Le Castellier,” 3 km southwest of the current city—an oppidum surrounded by a fortified enclosure of 200 hectares. (Note: Cottin 1956, p. 175) Established on the current site of Lisieux, the Gallo-Roman city featured monumental architecture, including public buildings such as an amphitheater, temples, municipal buildings, and baths. The site is located within the ancient city, at the juncture between dense housing and the countryside, and on the eastern edge of the Gallo-Roman settlement. It is near the road leading to Mediolanum Aulercorum (modern Évreux) and Juliobona (modern Lillebonne). (Note: de Boüard 1980, p. 370)

Map of ancient Lisieux and location of the ruins: the site of the thermal baths and villa is at No. 4.

The site was initially occupied by sparse housing in the early 1st century. The villa was built at the end of the 1st century, while the building that would become the bath complex was erected in the early 2nd century. At the site of the men’s baths, there was once metalworking activity, evidenced by the discovery of slag. Initially intended as a residence, this building had an original decorative scheme that is poorly understood due to major alterations related to its change in function.

A road 3.80 meters wide separated the baths and the villa. The site suggests that the city of the Lexovii followed an orthogonal plan at least from the Flavian period onward. The neighborhood was close to the decumanus maximus of the city and supplied by two semi-buried aqueducts. One of the aqueducts was older than the second but dated to a late period in the 2nd century; the water source was located near Glos, 9 km from Lisieux.

== Private residence ==
The building may have had an upper floor and around fifty rooms.

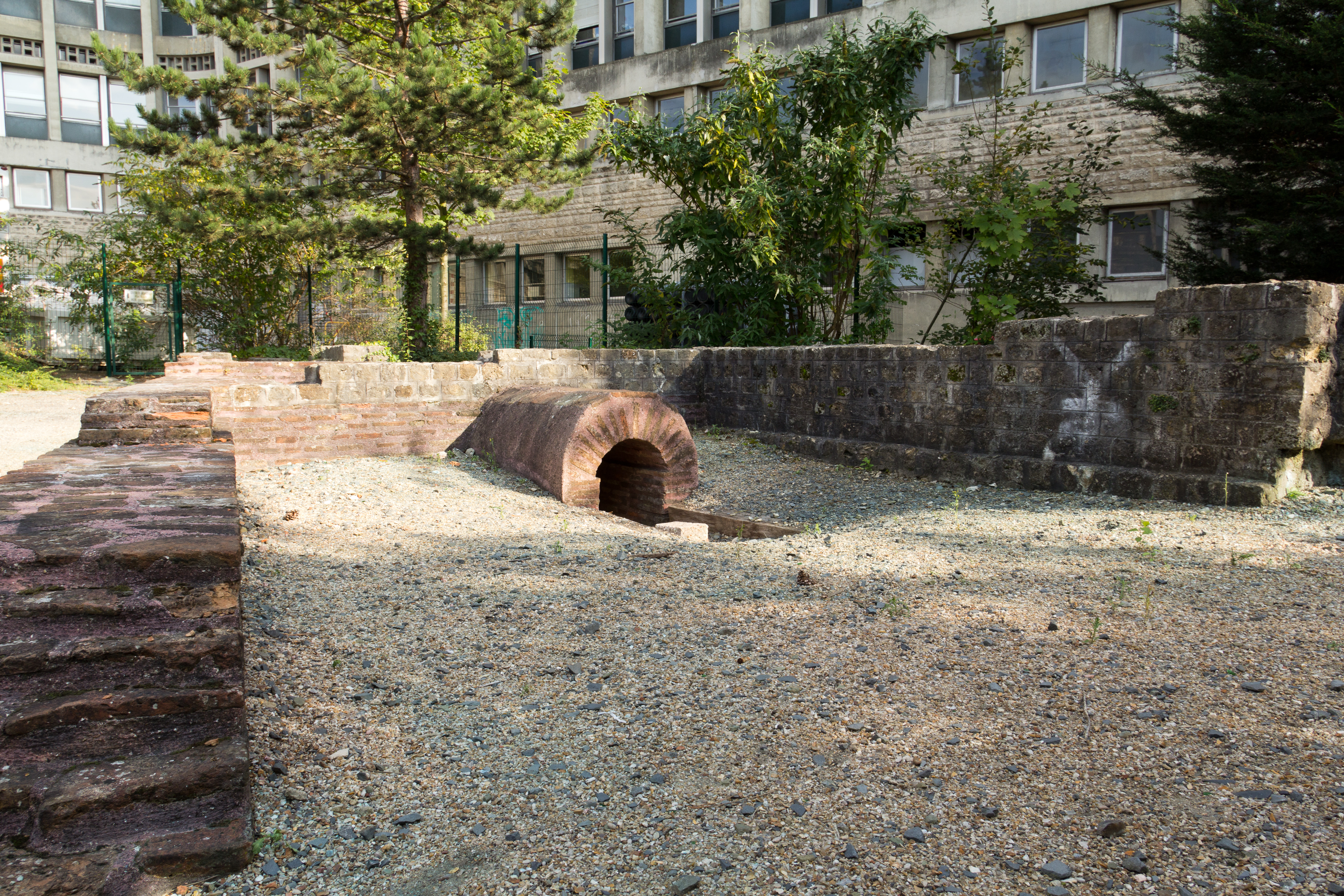
View of elements of the præfurnium of the private baths of the villa.

Only eight rooms, spared from the destruction of the late 1960s, were fully excavated during the 1978–1979 digs and are known. Four of them were connected by a hallway and four communicated directly with one another. The others, located near the construction site, were severely damaged. Three rooms in the villa revealed painted décor.

=== First group of rooms ===
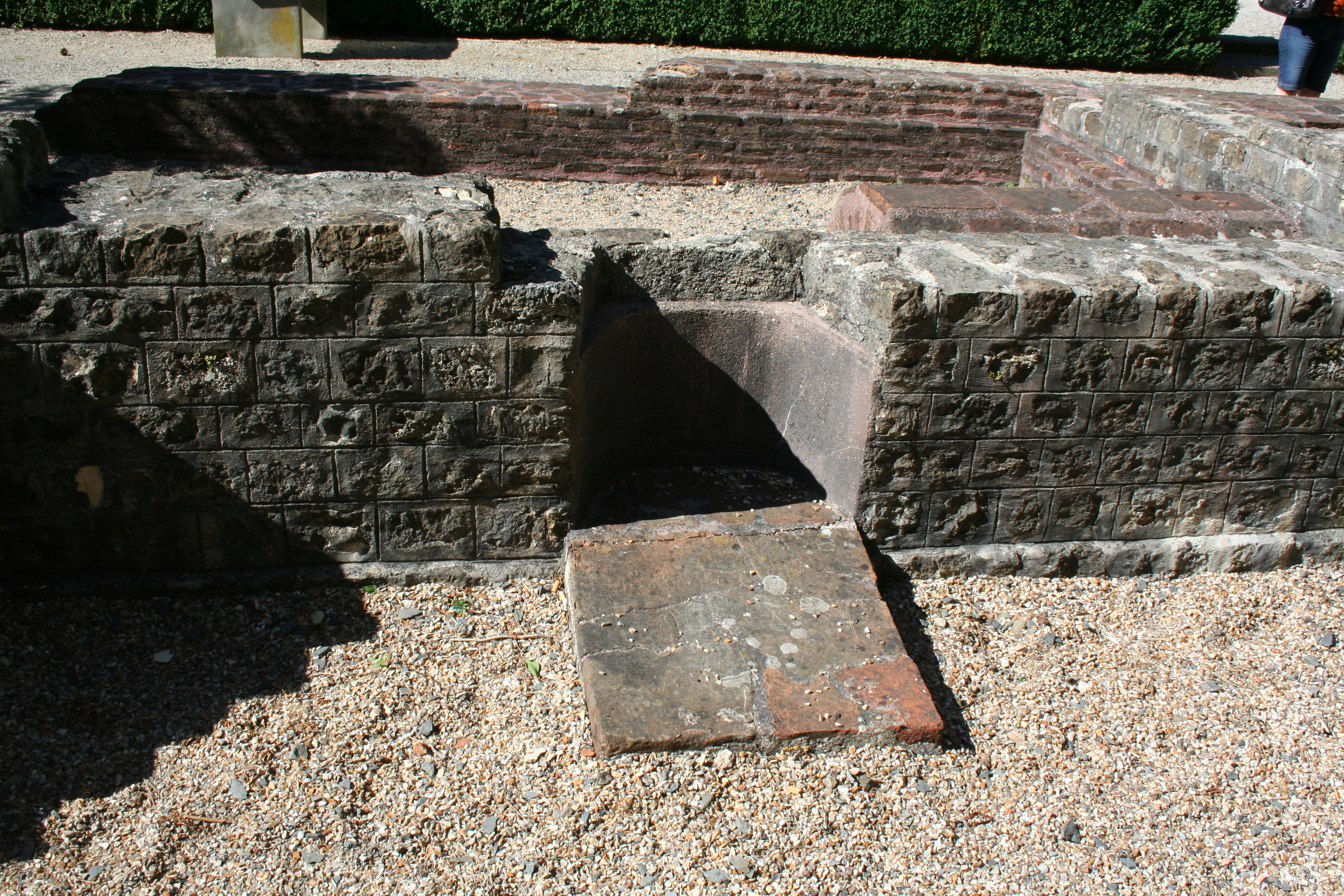
Hearth in one of the kitchens.

This group included two kitchens with hearths, one of which had a floor made of compacted earth. The base of the oven was well preserved. The wall was coated with white plaster. The other kitchen had a hearth set on a substructure and possibly included a spit-turning mechanism.

The two other rooms, designed for receiving guests, featured richly decorated wall paintings. One of them, covering at least 8 m^{2}, had a fish motif against a blue background, with two of the fish being particularly well preserved. The room had a constructed floor covered with limestone slabs.

The other room, heated by hypocaust and measuring 3.65 m by 2.50 m, had a wooden floor. Its vaulted ceiling was painted, covered with circular patterns featuring stylized rosettes in ochre red and dark green. The praefurnium, or heating system for the hypocaust, made of brick, is particularly well preserved.

=== Second group of rooms ===
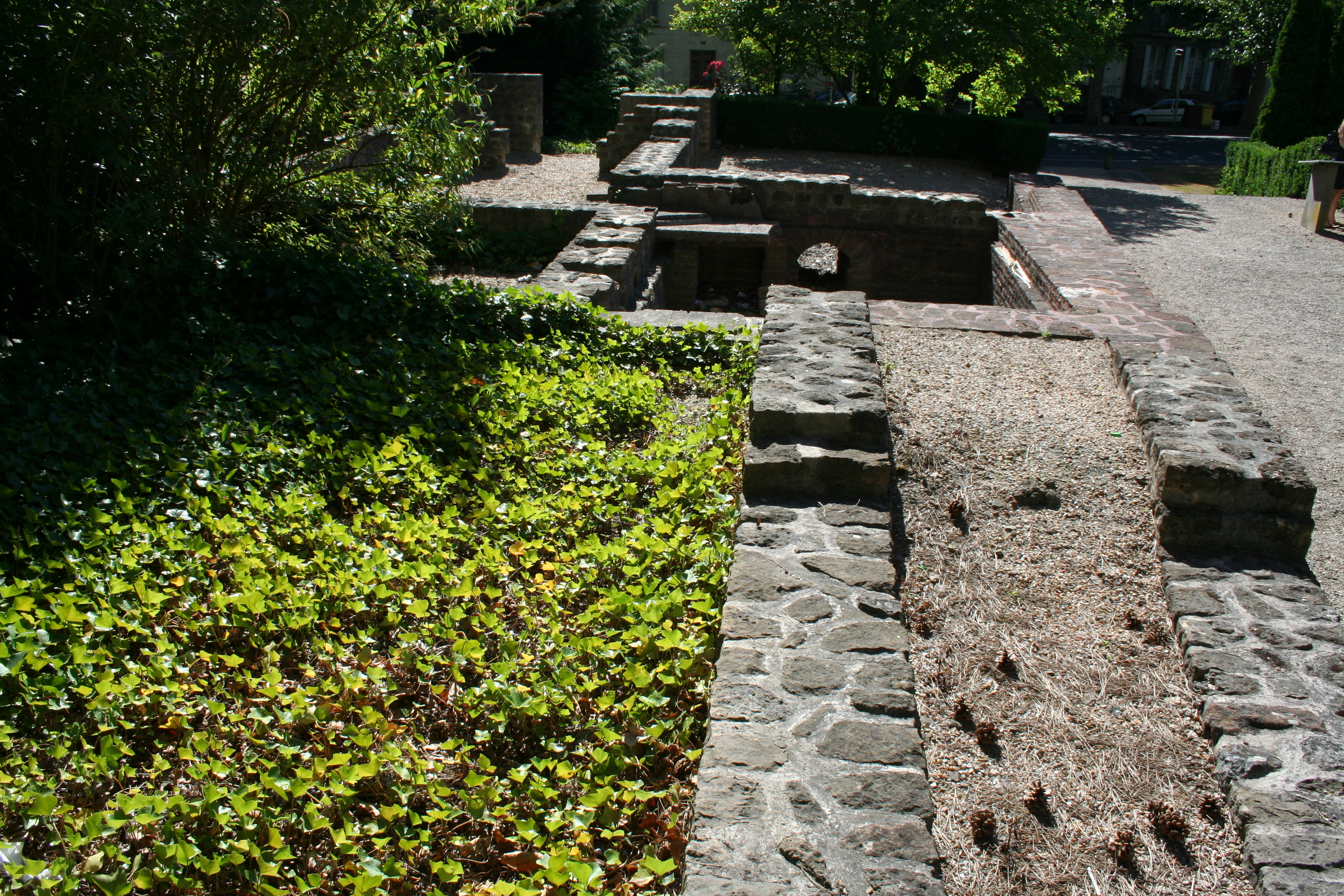
View of the preserved rooms of the villa, with the street separating it from the baths on the right.

One kitchen with a compacted earth floor was identified by the excavators in this group. During the digs, culinary waste, including oyster shells, mussels, and fish bones, was found.

A large room had a limestone floor, and its walls were painted bright red in the lower section. The upper part may have featured a frieze.

A small room with a hypocaust also featured painted décor of flowers and blind arcades on a white background. A fragment of sculpture depicting a marine animal's tail was found in this room.

== Description of the bath complex ==
The baths were originally a residential building, and the transformation prompts the excavator to propose two hypotheses: an act of evergetism (public generosity) toward the city or, more simply, the opening of a private installation.

Archaeologists identified a bath complex with one section for men and another for women, following the model of double baths, although this division reflects the final phase of construction. The rooms were arranged in a radial pattern rather than a linear succession, due to successive modifications. A total area of 1,300 m² was studied. (Note: Deniaux 2002, p. 117)

The bath complex opened onto a palaestra measuring 165 m², with a compacted earth floor. To the north was a portico and to the west, an aqueduct. The portico served to give a monumental appearance to the complex.

The baths were entirely painted. The study of the paintings enabled hypotheses regarding parts of the elevations, niches, and vaulted ceilings.

=== Women's baths ===
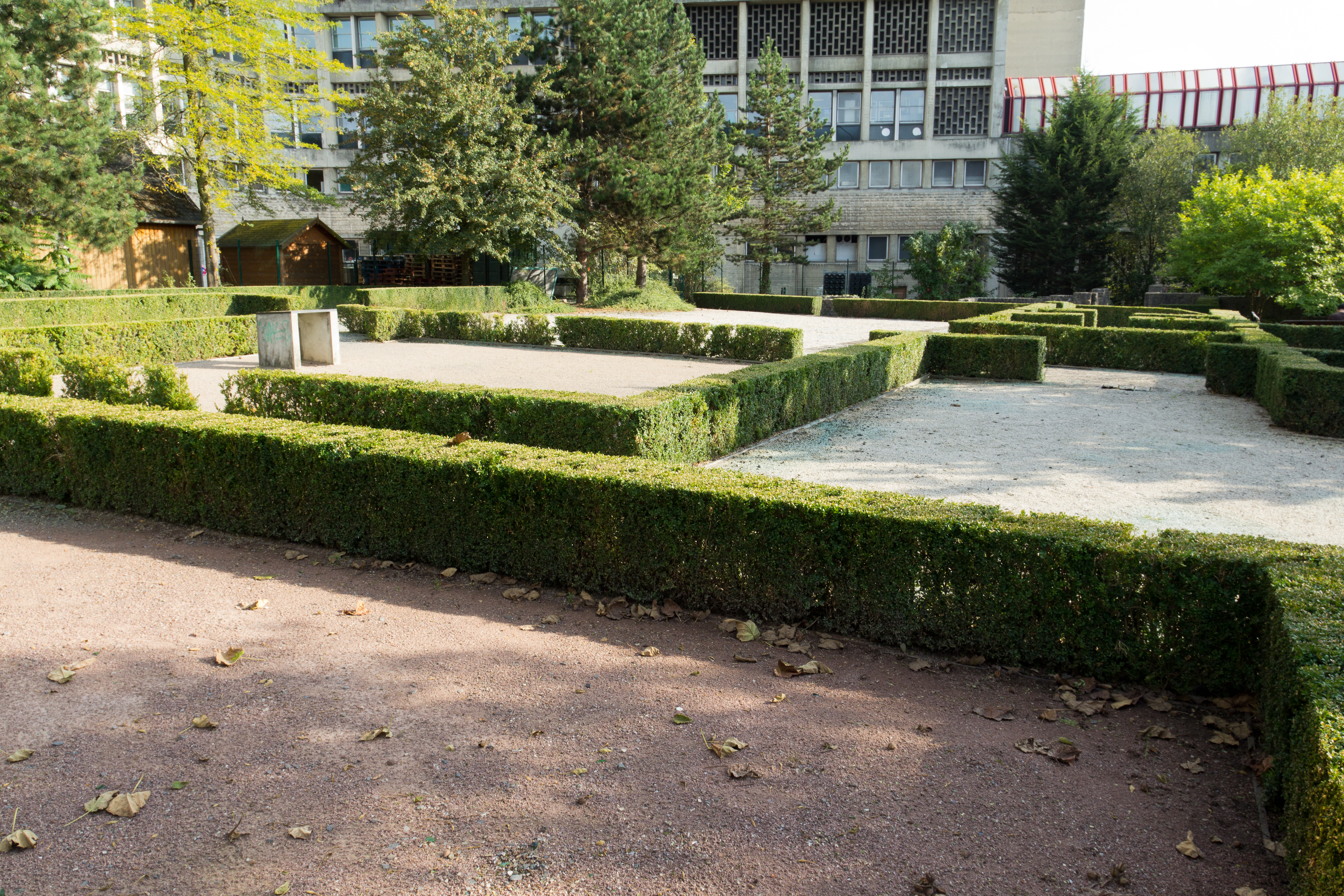
General view of the garden, with the location of the thermal baths.

The layout of the women’s baths does not follow the classic frigidarium, caldarium, tepidarium scheme but is organized in a “circular arrangement around a small courtyard,” where trinket jewelry was discovered. These feminine items led the excavator to identify the purpose of the space. Six rooms revealed painted decoration. (Note: Pilet 1986, p. 339) Fifteen rooms were identified, including a cold pool, a caldarium, a praefurnium, and above all, the most richly endowed room in terms of discoveries—a tepidarium.

==== Cold pool ====
The cold pool had two levels. It was built in the location of a courtyard. Water was drained via a wooden channel. The limestone slabs have completely disappeared. The pool’s layout suggests a role in a dual circulation system. Another room, about 6 m², may have been a second pool, with its floor and walls covered in white and green marble.

==== Caldarium ====
The caldarium, or hot bath, with a surface area of 19 m², is one of the best-preserved rooms. It featured a vaulted ceiling that retained the imprint of terracotta heating tubes (tubuli), many of which were found, either broken or intact, during the excavation. The floor still preserved parts of the raised floor system (suspensura) and white limestone slabs; green and purple marble fragments were also discovered there.

It had a painted decoration adorned with flowers and geometric motifs, as well as a veneer of green and purple marble. The exact arrangement of the décor is not well known, although Alix Barbet mentions small shrines, railings, and a niche. The geometric decoration on the vault has been reconstructed and revealed a rich color palette.

==== Præfurnium ====
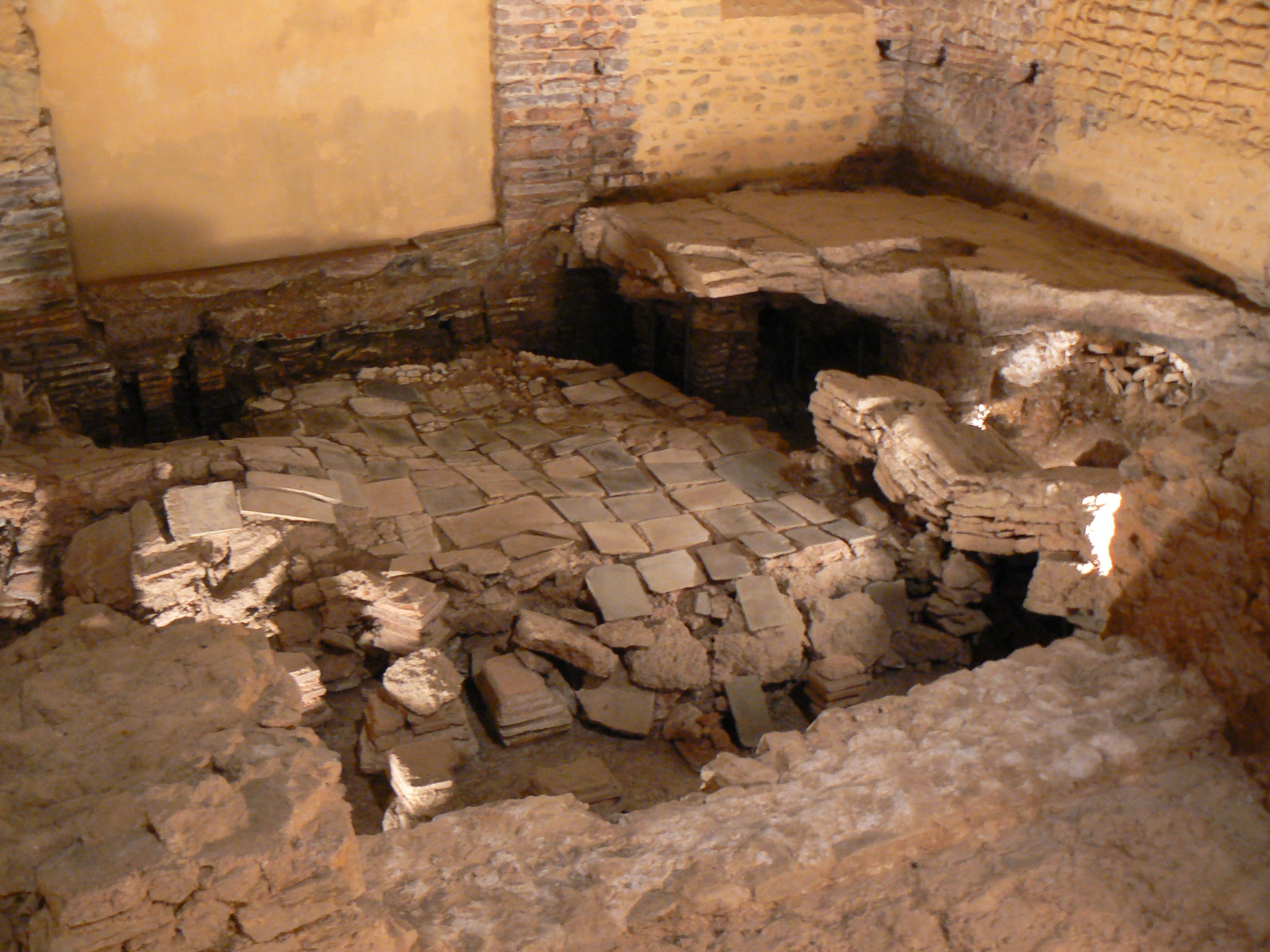
Hot bath on the floor known as a suspensura, collapsed in the Gallo-Roman baths at Entrammes.

The praefurnium or heating system was located at the northwest corner of the tepidarium and opened onto a service courtyard.

==== Tepidarium ====
The tepidarium or warm bath, with a surface area of 60 m² or 80 m², was set up in a former frigidarium and equipped with hypocaust heating. The layout is dated to the first half of the 2nd century but was altered by the end of the century or the beginning of the 3rd century. (Note: Barbet 2008, p. 268)

Half of the 130 pilettes (small supporting columns) were fairly well preserved, and the suspended floor (suspensura) was made of limestone slabs, some of which had collapsed. A bench contained channels for smoke evacuation, and due to the absence of wall flues, excavators identified the room as the warm room.

The paintings covered 300 m², of which 90 m² were recovered, reaching at least 4 meters in height.

=== Male baths ===
This part of the building is poorly known, as it was destroyed as early as the medieval period. It too was adorned with wall paintings.

However, some elements were identified, including a suite of cold rooms of at least 80 m², a hot pool of 3.80 m², and two damaged hypocausts. In addition, excavators uncovered a hypocaust with 30 pilettes, in poor condition; however, decorative elements featuring geometric and vegetal motifs were found there.

== Wall paintings ==
=== Villa paintings ===
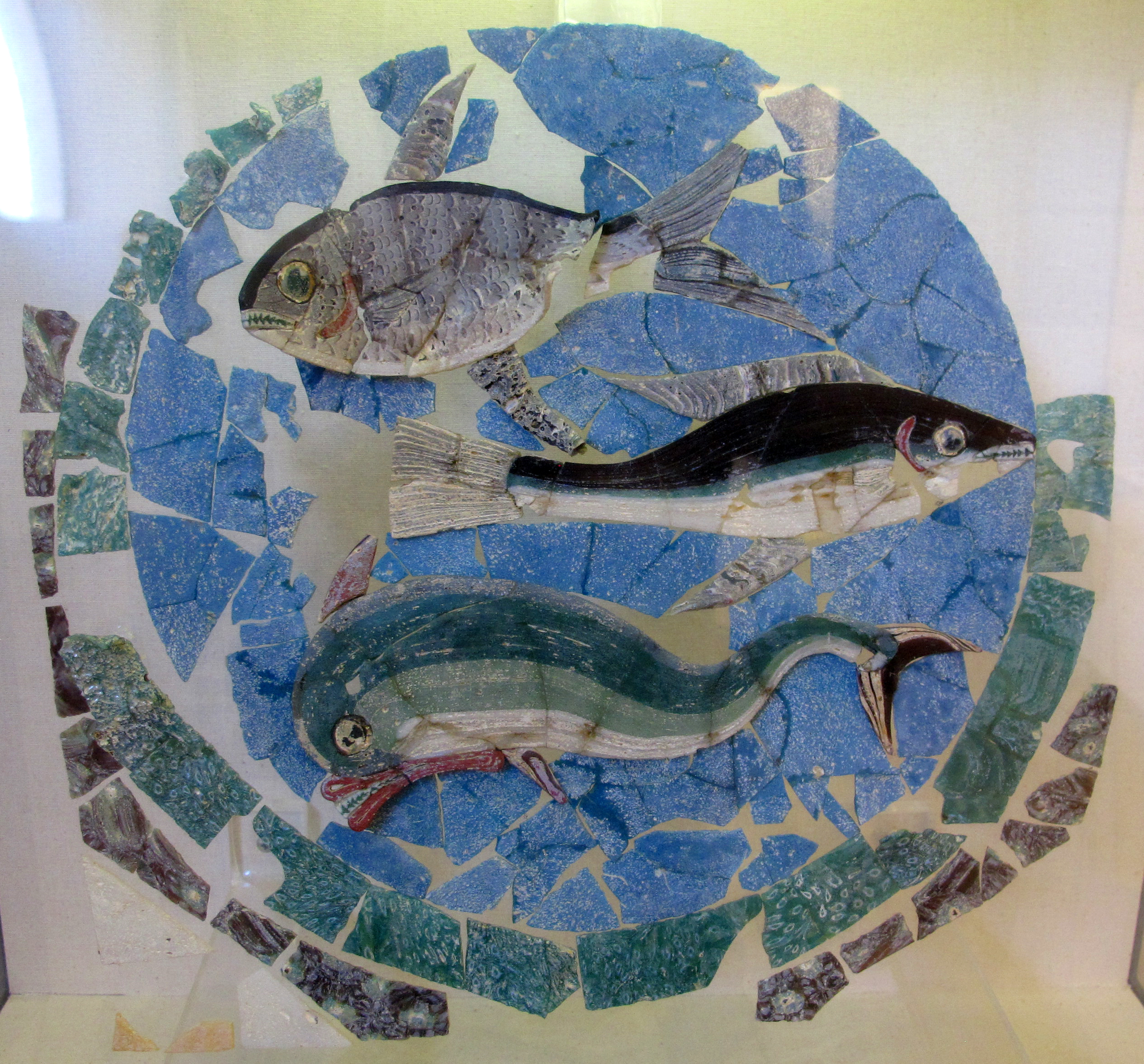
Decoration on a glass panel depicting fish on a blue background from Ariminum, mid-3rd century, now in Rimini

Two fish, possibly mackerel, are shown head-to-tail and caught in nets. This fresco is preserved over an area of 2 meters by 0.60 meters. The painted decor with fish motifs on a blue background is treated in a unique style at Lisieux and represents a singular example in Gaul; it cannot be dated before the mid-1st century. (Note: de Boüard 1980, p. 371)

The corridor measured at least six meters in length. Its height was estimated at a minimum of four meters and was proportionate to the nearby bath buildings. The corridor floor was covered with parquet.

The walls of the corridor were painted “to imitate polychrome marble” (Florence Delacampagne) in the lower section, which was about two meters high, while the upper section featured “panels or garlands on a white background.” This white background served to brighten a poorly lit space.

The corridor featured a decor of stylized small columns linked by suspended knots.

The Soissons team was able to reconstruct four large panels measuring 1.25 meters and three smaller ones measuring fifty centimeters, for a total length of seven meters and a height of four meters. The painted decor, on a white background, used a palette of green, yellow-green, and brown, along with dark red and pink. According to Alix Barbet, this decor dates from the late 2nd to early 3rd century. (Note: Barbet 2008, p. 271)

=== Tepidarium paintings from the women’s baths ===
In the tepidarium, two layers of decoration were superimposed, despite notable technical differences. These differences stemmed from the need to prevent water from rising by capillarity and from the presence of two separate teams of painters: one assigned to the lower marble imitation decor, and the other to the figures. Among the depicted elements are human figures in the upper part, including one life-size human head. The paintings also featured animals and plants.

The base, up to a height of 1.60 meters, was adorned with a compartmentalized decor in multiple registers. The lower section consisted of a broad plinth imitating speckled green marble and white marble veined with pink, divided into various compartments. The upper part of this register was decorated with imitation marble veneers in opus sectile, alternating with imitation dark green marble. The most common motif is a green circle flanked on either side by an isosceles triangle.

In the upper section, at 1.75 meters in height, is a decor featuring figures on a blue background, with two relatively well-preserved characters. These human figures likely represented the Nine Muses, based on their hairstyles and attributes. Their clothing was voluminous and majestic.

The most beautiful representation is a figure in left profile on a blue background, dressed in a tunic and cloak. She has fair skin, a strong nose, and abundant hair. In the background is an architectural element, a double basin, from which extends a ribbon. In the background stands a dark red column on a pedestal. The entire scene is framed beneath an arch. The arch, with a presumed radius of 1.20 meters, is positioned at a height of 3 meters.

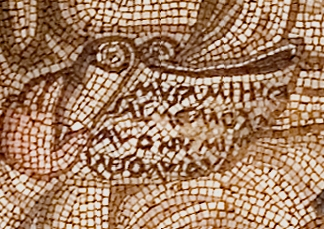
Scroll spread out on the knees of the mosaic of Virgil, National Museum of Bardo (Tunisia).

Another figure on a blue background was found, though only fragmentarily, even if it could be identified as feminine, dressed in a pink tunic and wearing a bracelet on her arm. (Note: Pilet 1986, p. 340)

Other fragments of figures were also found but are very incomplete. One of the figures is seated and unrolls a scroll on their knees. Another incomplete figure is crowned with foliage and likely held an object; the depiction of which has unfortunately been lost. Other figures wear diadems—one holds a lyre, another a plectrum. (Note: Barbet 2008, p. 269) These elements support the interpretation proposed by Alix Barbet.

According to Alix Barbet, the scene of the Muses was situated between pilasters and blind arcades. The arches "framed two panels." Under each arch, given the available space, two figures would have faced each other. The figure of Apollo may have completed the decoration.

The quality of some of the other recovered elements, including fruit baskets and various birds, does not allow for a full reconstruction. These fragments depict baskets and farmyard animals; they are too partial and have nothing to do with the scene interpreted as mythological. Perhaps they belonged to a depiction of "a garden populated with birds."

=== Significance of the painted decor ===
The presence of tableaux placed above marble-imitation panels seems, according to Alix Barbet, "typical of the Severan period, when a renewed interest in major mythological themes emerged." The painting in the tepidarium is interpreted by Alix Barbet as "the gathering of the Muses, evoking Olympus and the access to immortality through culture, and sets very high the ambitions of the city’s inhabitants who frequented the baths." The fragments resemble wall plasters unearthed in Great Britain, dated to the 4th century.

Alix Barbet considers that the frescoes can be dated to the late 2nd century but also possibly to the early 3rd century. Roman painting from this period—the end of the 2nd century—is less well known than the earlier period illustrated by the painted compositions from the sites destroyed by Vesuvius in 79 CE.

The Lisieux site differs from the usual finds of painted wall plasters discovered in Gaul, which tend more toward geometric compositions or stereotypical figured friezes. The site yielded luxurious paintings but also simpler compositions, with wide panels alternating with narrower panels adorned with vegetation—according to a motif common at the time in Belgic Gaul. The same artisans may have worked on both types of decoration.

== Dating and destruction of the site ==
=== Dating and destruction of the bath complex ===
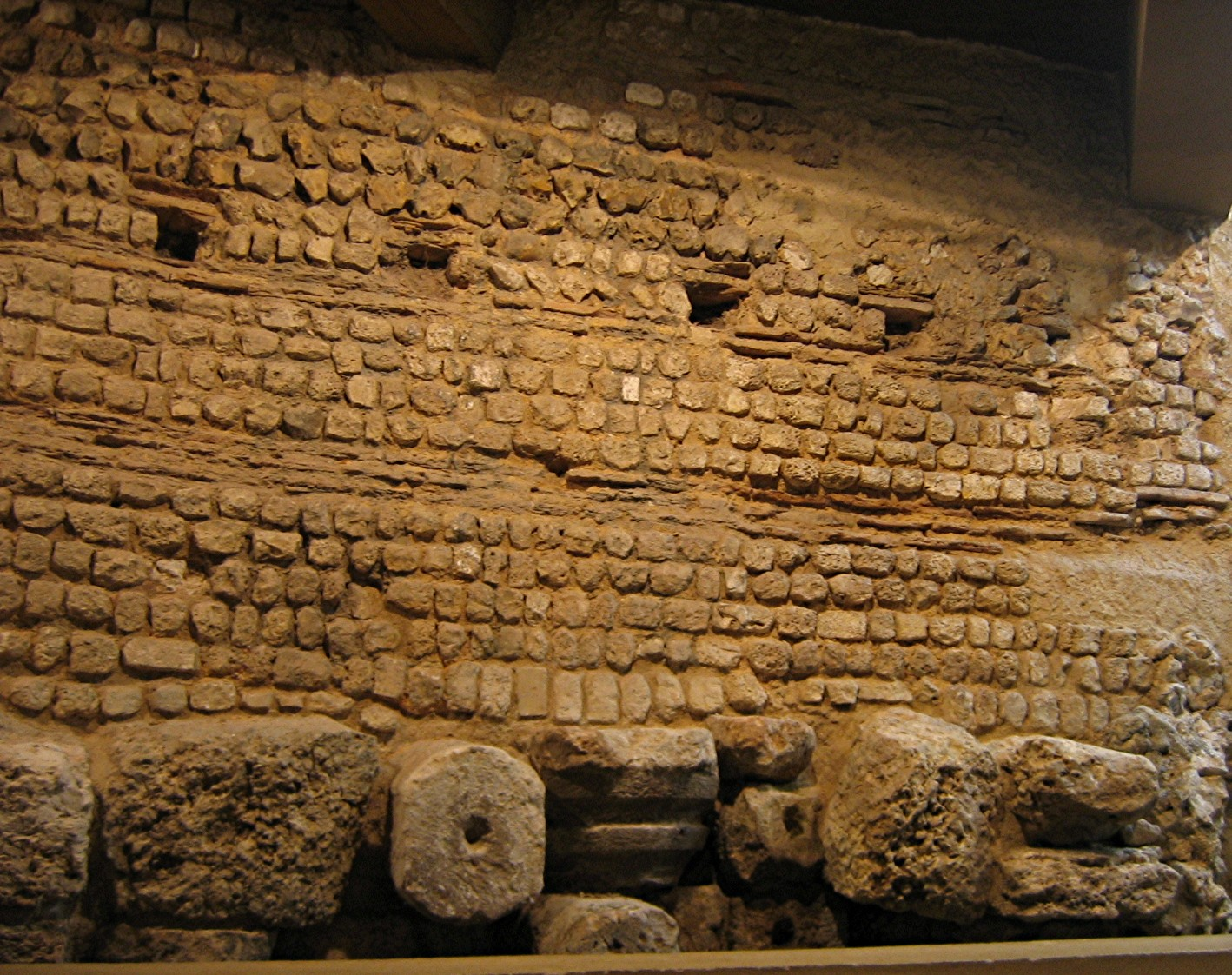
The end of the 3rd century was a very turbulent period. Many cities, such as Lisieux and Évreux (see the photograph of the section of the city wall in the museum in Évreux), built city walls and their surface area shrunk.

The bath complex building has been dated to the first quarter of the 2nd century, with major modifications in the middle of the same century and signs of work at the end of the century. From a residential function, the site was transformed into public baths.

The layout of the structure did not change, but changes in the function of certain rooms are to be noted, at an undetermined date—the most notable being the transformation of the frigidarium into a tepidarium. Some rooms were joined together and the floor was destroyed to install the hypocaust heating system.

The destruction of the entire bath complex by fire is dated to the years 268–280. Following this event, the building was not rebuilt. Claude Lemaître suggests that the destruction was linked to the unrest of 275–276 CE.

In the destruction layers, coins were found, dated to the 3rd and 4th centuries. The 4th-century coin was found above the remains of the building’s roofing elements. A stonemasons’ workshop was set up near the site, as evidenced by the discovery of large blocks intended for the construction of the nearby castrum wall.

The monument, located outside the Low Empire walls of the city, was used as a stone quarry from the 4th to the 14th century, and even into the modern era, down to its foundations.

The male section of the baths was occupied by potters at the end of the 11th century and in the 13th century. In the Late Middle Ages, the site lay outside the city.

=== Dating and destruction of the villa ===
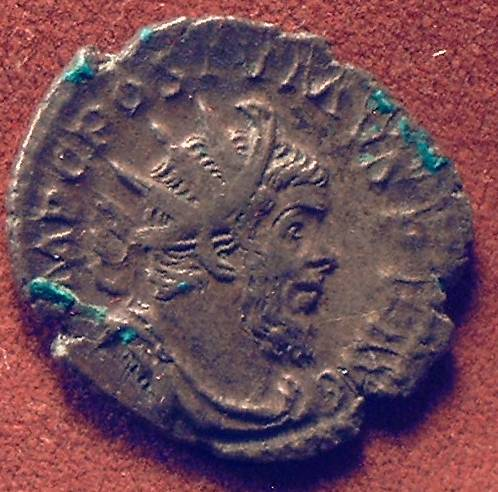
Antoninianus coin of Emperor Postumus; the discovery of such a coin from this emperor made it possible to date the last layers of occupation.

The residential area is dated to the Flavian period, more precisely to the years 50–75, and succeeded an earlier occupation from the Julio-Claudian period (second quarter of the 1st century), which had wall paintings. The first residence was built mostly of rammed earth. The ground was leveled with debris from the earlier habitation to allow for a more extensive construction.

At the end of the 1st century and during the 2nd century, the building experienced a period of expansion and prosperity. The modifications may be linked to a fire, traces of which were identified by the excavators.

Unlike other places in the city that were destroyed by fire, this residential area was gradually abandoned, and before the events of the late 3rd century. The last traces of occupation, very sparse, consist of two coins from the reign of Postumus (260–269). Claude Lemaître raises the question of a connection to an economic downturn in the city or the general situation in Gaul. Due to the circumstances, the population retreated within the city walls. In any case, after a methodical recovery of all construction materials, including those of the roofing (flat and rounded tiles), the villa was destroyed: the wall paintings collapsed onto the debris already present on the site, and eventually the walls of the building were razed to create a glacis for the Low Empire wall constructed around 275–276. This destruction of the site thus predates the invasions of the late third quarter of the 3rd century.

== See also ==
- History of Normandy
- House with the Grand Peristyle in Vieux-la-Romaine
- Vostrus Stele

== Bibliography ==
- Barbet, Alix; Allag, Claudine (1984). La peinture murale romaine de la Picardie à la Normandie [Roman wall paintings from Picardy to Normandy] (in French). pp. 101–102.
- Barbet, Alix; Allag, Claudine (1994). "Thermes et maisons de l'hôpital - Architecture" [Thermal baths and hospital buildings - Architecture]. Lisieux avant l'an mil : essai de reconstitution [Lisieux before the year 1000: an attempt at reconstruction] (in French). Lisieux: Ville de Lisieux. pp. 32–35. ISBN 2-9508063-1-7.
- Barbet, Alix (2008). La peinture murale en Gaule romaine [Wall painting in Roman Gaul] (in French). Paris: Picard. ISBN 978-2-7084-0757-2.
- Allag, Claudine; Batrel, Michel (1985). "Peinture murale en Gaule" [Wall painting in Gaul]. British Archaeological Project (in French). 240: 29–38.
- Cottin, François (1956). "Noviomagus Lexoviorum des temps les plus anciens à la fin de l'époque romaine" [Noviomagus Lexoviorum from the earliest times to the end of the Roman era]. Bulletin de la Société des Antiquaires de Normandie (in French) (LIII): 169–196. ISSN 1271-5549.
- Delacampagne, Florence (1990). Le Calvados [Calvados]. Carte archéologique de la Gaule (in French). Paris: Académie des inscriptions et belles-lettres. ISBN 2-87754-011-1.
- Deniaux, Elisabeth; Lorren, Claude; Bauduin, Pierre; Jarry, Thomas (2002). La Normandie avant les Normands, de la conquête romaine à l'arrivée des Vikings [Normandy before the Normans, from the Roman conquest to the arrival of the Vikings] (in French). Rennes. ISBN 2737311179.
- Deniaux, Élisabeth (2002). "L'Antiquité" [Antiquity]. La Normandie avant les Normands, de la conquête romaine à l'arrivée des Vikings [Normandy before the Normans, from the Roman conquest to the arrival of the Vikings]. Université (in French). Rennes: Ouest-France. pp. 1–196. ISBN 2-7373-1117-9.
- Lemaître, Claude (1983a). "Un habitat gallo-romain urbain à Lisieux (Calvados)" [An urban Gallo-Roman settlement in Lisieux (Calvados)]. La Normandie, études archéologiques : actes du 105e congrès national des sociétés savantes [Normandy, archaeological studies: proceedings of the 105th national congress of learned societies]. Actes des congrès nationaux des sociétés savantes (in French). Paris: Comité des travaux historiques et scientifiques. pp. 51–65. ISBN 2-7355-0010-1.
- Lemaître, Claude (1983b). "Lisieux : thermes publics et d'un quartier romains" [Lisieux: public baths and a Roman quarter]. Dossiers histoire et archéologie (in French) (72): 16–27. ISSN 0299-7339.
- Lemaître, Claude (1994). "Thermes et maisons de l'hôpital - Architecture" [Thermal baths and hospital buildings - Architecture]. Lisieux avant l'an mil : essai de reconstitution [Lisieux before the year 1000: an attempt at reconstruction] (in French). Lisieux: Ville de Lisieux. pp. 30–31. ISBN 2-9508063-1-7.
- de Boüard, Michel (1968). "Circonscription de Haute et Basse Normandie" [Constituency of Upper and Lower Normandy]. Gallia (in French). 26 (2): 347–372. ISSN 0016-4119.
- de Boüard, Michel (1972). "Circonscription de Haute et Basse Normandie" [Constituency of Upper and Lower Normandy]. Gallia (in French). 30 (2): 347–372. ISSN 0016-4119.
- de Boüard, Michel (1980). "Circonscription de Haute et Basse Normandie" [Constituency of Upper and Lower Normandy]. Gallia (in French). 38 (2): 367–379. ISSN 0016-4119.
- Decaens, Joseph (1982). "Circonscription de Basse Normandie" [Constituency of Lower Normandy]. Gallia (in French). 40 (2): 307–322. ISSN 0016-4119.
- Pilet, Christian (1986). "Circonscription de Basse Normandie" [Constituency of Lower Normandy]. Gallia (in French). 44 (2): 335–359. ISSN 0016-4119.
