= Hôpital de la Miséricorde d'Ajaccio =

Geography
- Location: Ajaccio, France
- Coordinates: 41.94712597507735°N 8.779937028885694°E

Organisation
- Type: General

History
- Opened: 1581

Links
- Website: www.ch-ajaccio.fr/hopital/histoire
- Lists: Hospitals in France

The Hôpital de la Miséricorde d'Ajaccio is the public hospital in Ajaccio, France. L'ospedale dei Poveri was founded by Colonel Livio Pozzo-Di-Borgo in 1581. It was nationalised in 1793 and moved to Rossino on the Sanguinaires road in 1855. The present hospital was built in 1955.

It suffered an unprecedented level of debt. In 2008, it had an accumulated deficit of over €50 million.
