= Bichat–Claude Bernard Hospital =

- Assistance Publique – Hôpitaux de Paris
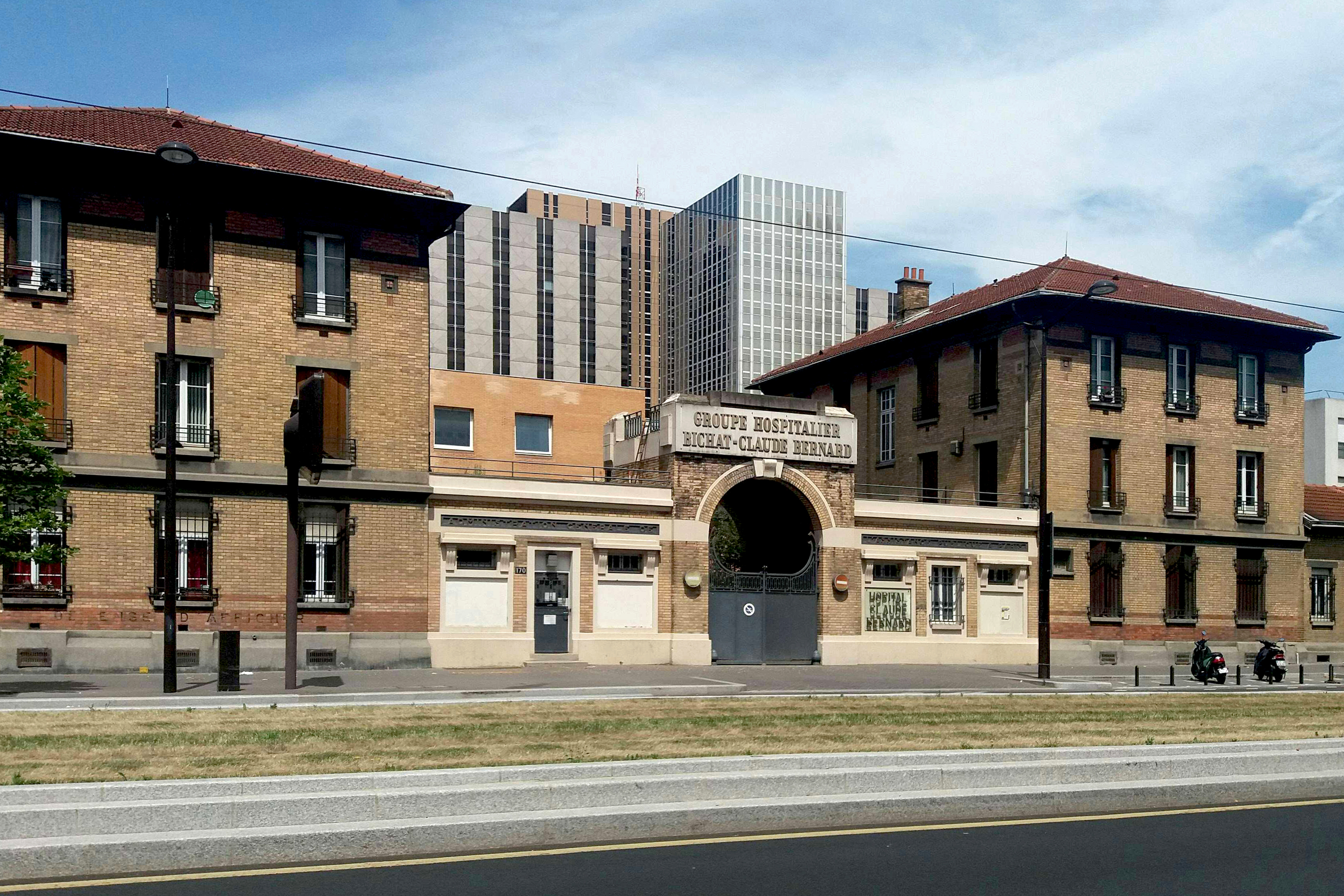
- Tour Bichat (background) and Secteur Claude-Bernard (front)

Geography
- Location: 46 Rue Henri Huchard; 75018 Paris, France
- Coordinates: 48°53′56″N 2°19′55″E

Organisation
- Type: Teaching
- Affiliated university: University of Paris
- Network: Hôpitaux Universitaires Paris Nord Val de Seine

Services
- Emergency department: Yes

History
- Founded: 1881

Links
- Website: hupnvs.aphp.fr/bichat-claude-bernard
- Lists: Hospitals in France

The Bichat–Claude Bernard Hospital (French: Hôpital Bichat-Claude-Bernard [opital biʃa klod bɛʁnaʁ]) is located in the 18th arrondissement of Paris, France, and is operated by Assistance Publique – Hôpitaux de Paris (APHP). It was founded in 1881 as l'Hôpital Bichat (after Xavier Bichat), incorporating the units of nearby Hôpital Claude-Bernard upon the latter's demolition in 1970. The Bichat–Claude Bernard Hospital is also a teaching hospital of the Université Paris Cité.

Since 2007, the fire department has deemed the hospital's fire procedures and emergency exits unsafe. According to the APHP, the building cannot be modernized.

In 2017, the hospital opened the country's first unit entirely dedicated to dermatology issues related to tattoos.

In 2023, the project to merge the Bichat-Claude Bernard Hospital and the Beaujon Hospital to create the Grand Paris-Nord Hospital in Saint-Ouen was cancelled.
