= Paul Morel Hospital =

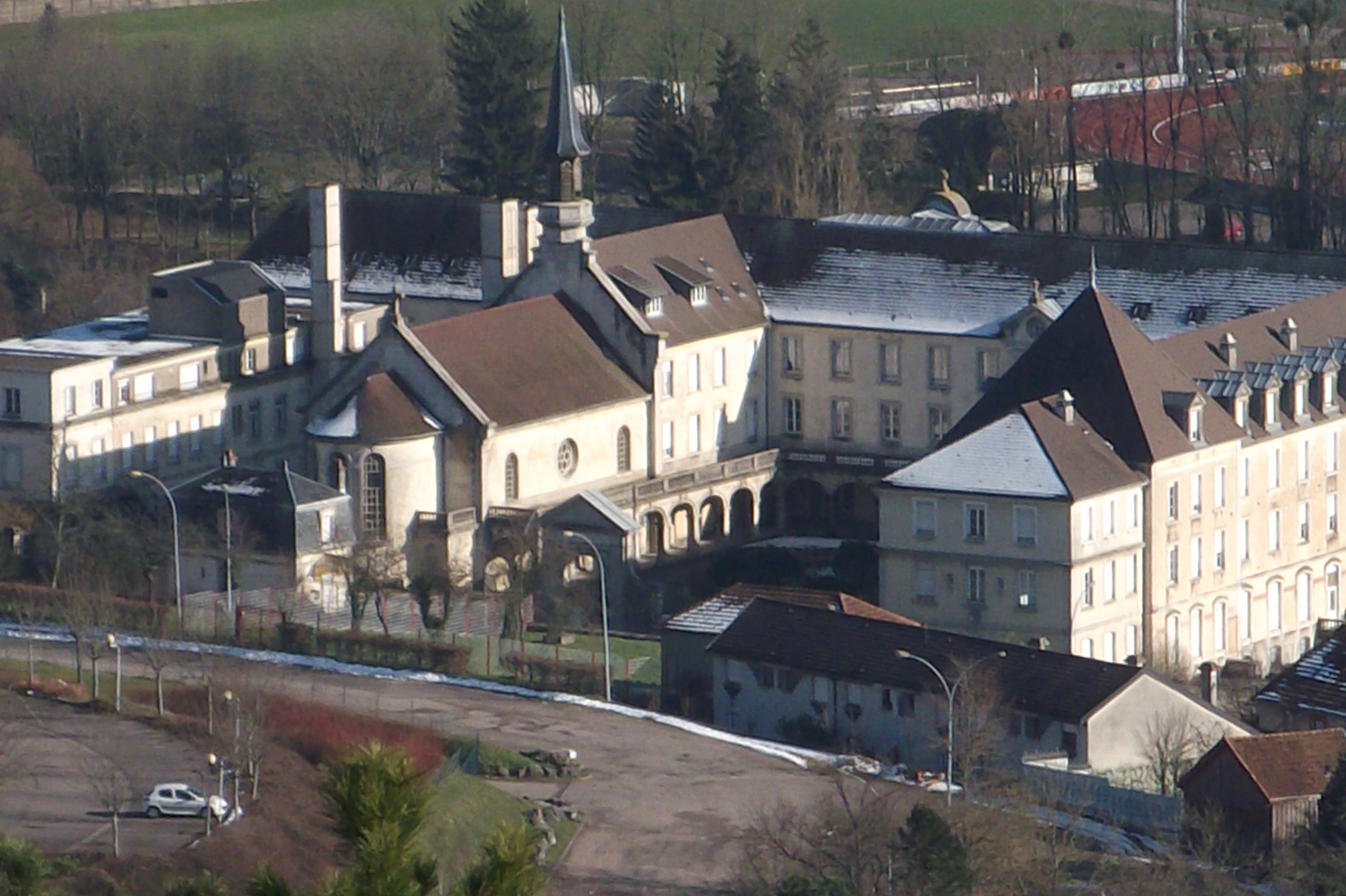

Geography
- Location: Vesoul, France
- Coordinates: 47.626196°N 6.165164°E (approximate)

Organisation
- Type: General
- Patron: Paul Morel

History
- Opened: 1938
- Closed: 2009

Links
- Lists: Hospitals in France

Paul Morel Hospital is an ancient hospital located in Vesoul, France. It is located at 41 Avebye Arustude Briand, 70000 Vesoul, France. It was in operation from 1938 to 2009. Paul Morel was the mayor of Vesoul from 1908 to 1933.

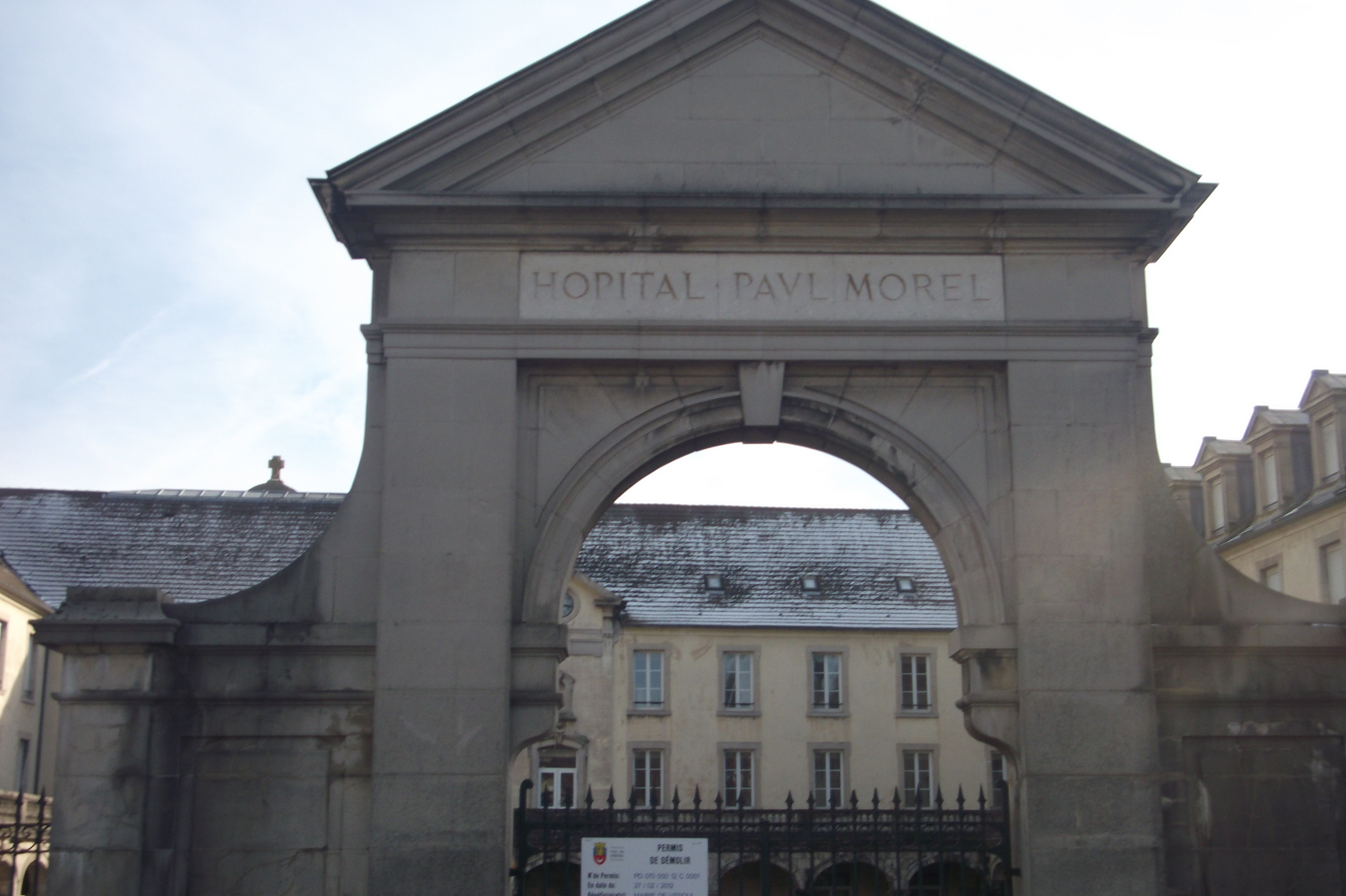

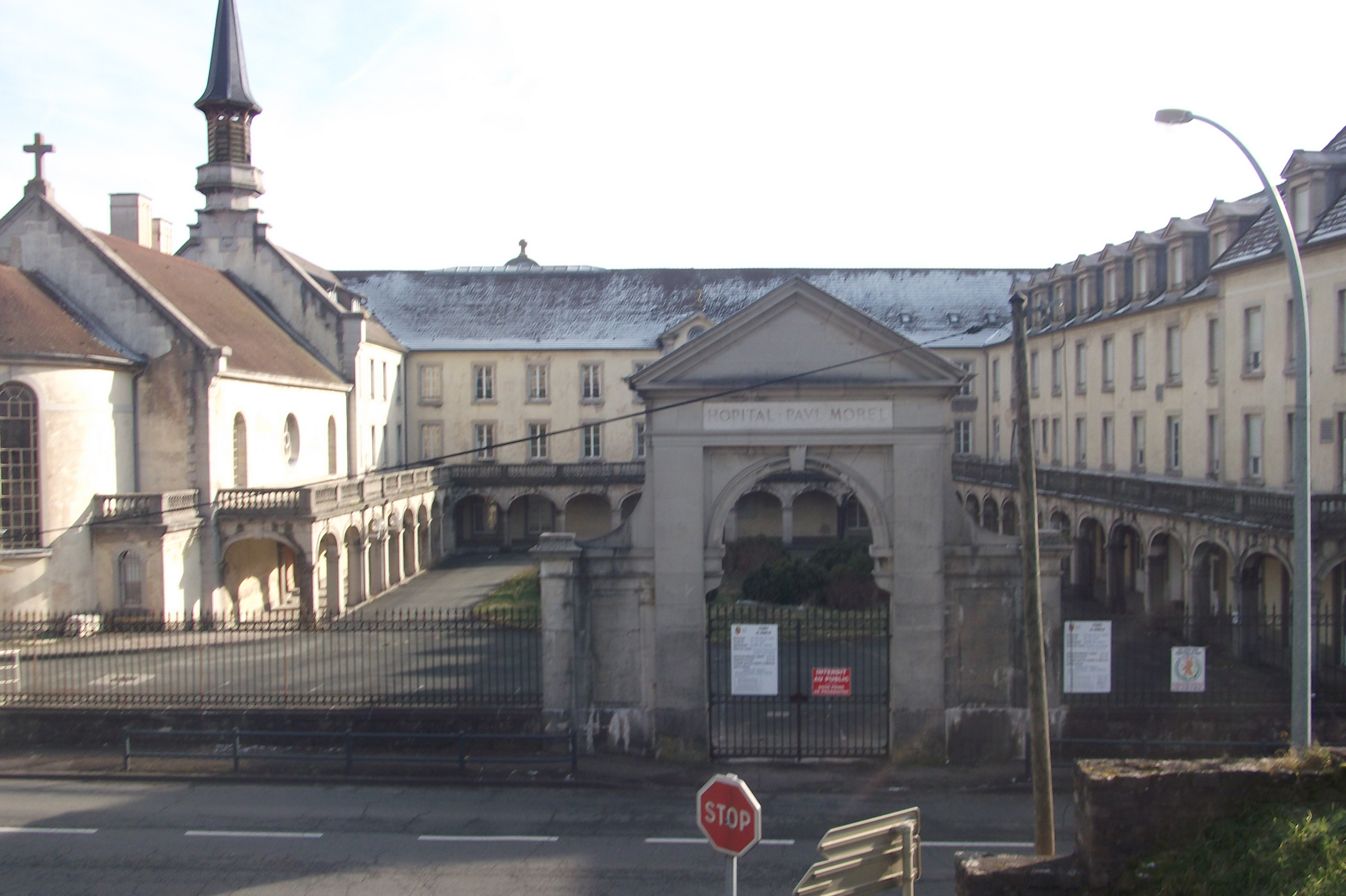

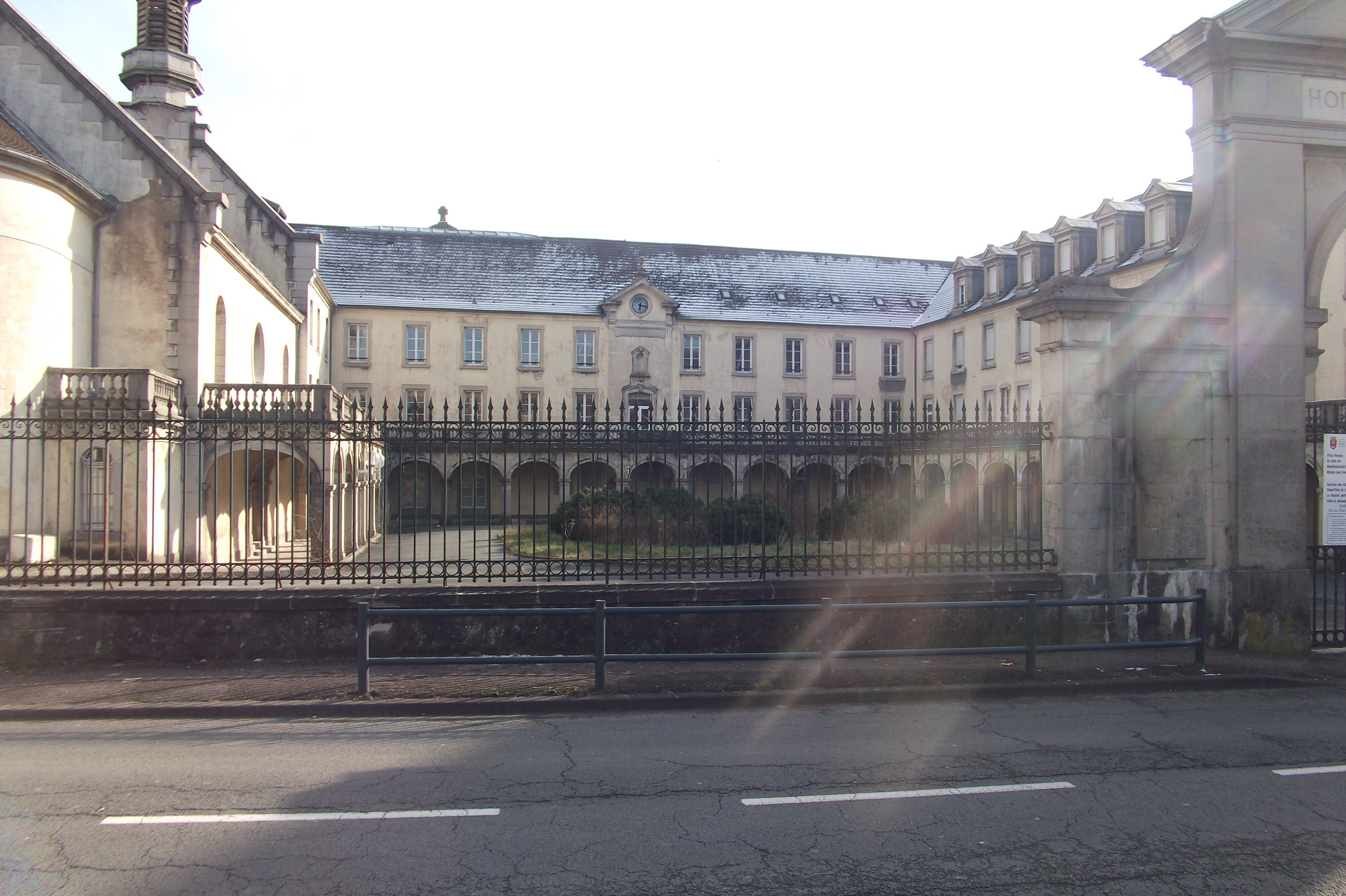

== See also ==
- List of hospitals in France
