= Beaujon Hospital =

- Assistance Publique – Hôpitaux de Paris
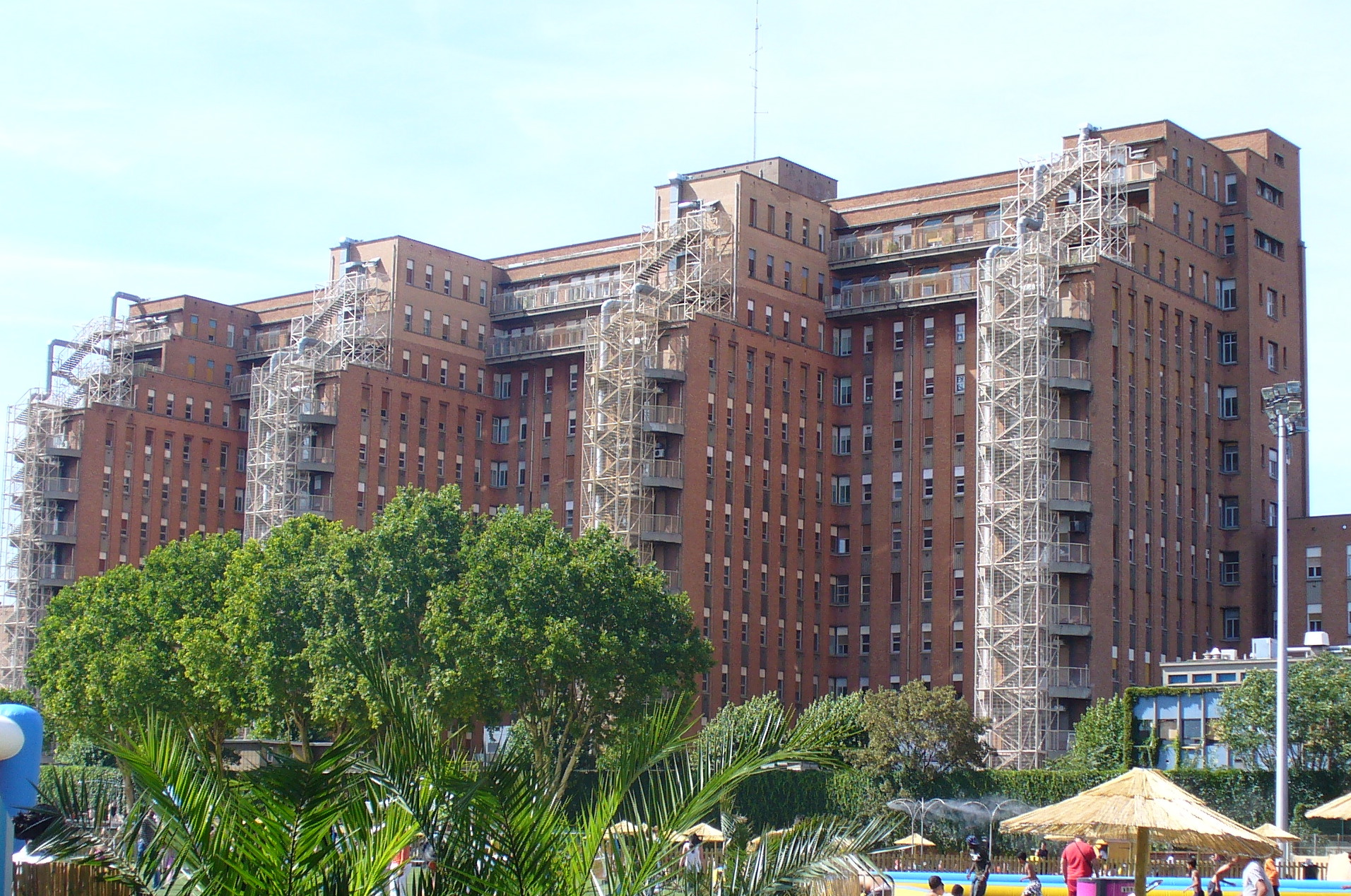
- The rear façade of the hospital.

Geography
- Location: Clichy, Paris, France
- Coordinates: 48°54′30″N 2°18′37″E

Organisation
- Network: Hôpitaux Universitaires Paris Nord Val de Seine

Services
- Emergency department: Yes
- Beds: 464

History
- Founded: 1935

Links
- Lists: Hospitals in France

The Beaujon Hospital (French: Hôpital Beaujon) is located in Clichy, Paris, France and is operated by APHDP. It was named after Nicolas Beaujon, an eighteenth-century French banker. It opened in 1935 and was designed by Jean Walter.

In 2023, the project to merge the Bichat–Claude Bernard Hospital and the Beaujon Hospital to create the Grand Paris-Nord Hospital in Saint-Ouen was cancelled.
