= Vostrus Stele =

Roman funerary stele discovered in 1861

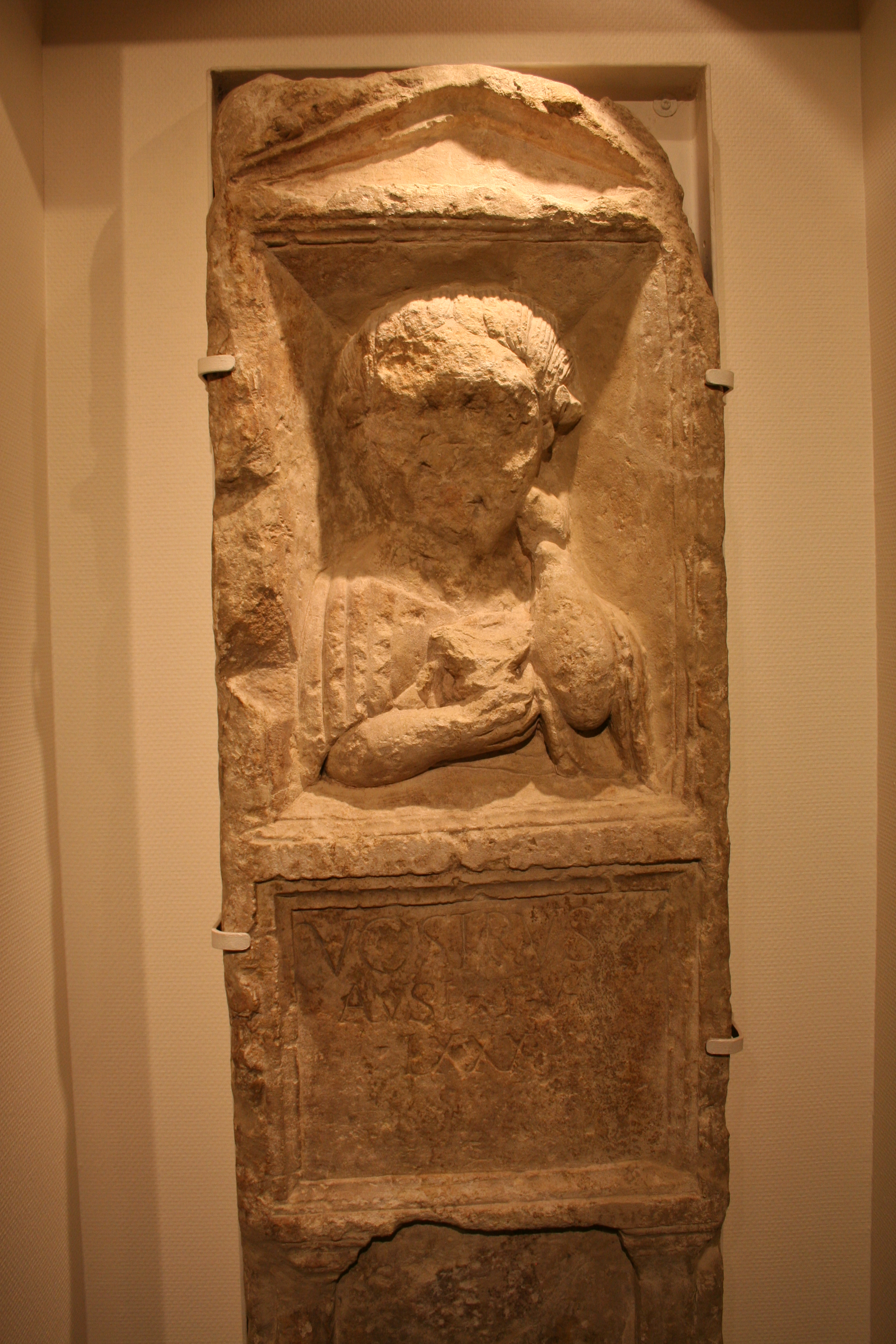
- The Vostrus stele photographed in 2009.
- Interactive map of Vostrus Stele
- Coordinates: 49°11′08″N 0°21′49″W
- Type: Funerary stele
- Height: 1,78 m

The Vostrus Stele is a Roman funerary stele discovered in 1861 in Lisieux, France.

It belongs to the collections of the Société des antiquaires de Normandie and, after having been conserved in the museum of this learned society, it is now part of the permanent exhibition of the Musée d'archéologie et d'ethnographie de Caen; an early cast is kept in the Musée d'art et d'histoire de Lisieux.

The monument is the only funerary stele to have survived from the excavations of the Grand-Jardin necropolis, a site explored in the second half of the 19th century under conditions that are still poorly understood. Despite losses due to the dispersal of excavated material and bombardment during the Battle of Normandy in 1944, artefacts recovered in the course of this research are preserved in various museums.

In addition to a monument depicting a man, the artefact also contains an inscription, the reading of which is widely accepted. The figure's clothing, adapted to local weather conditions, suggests a Romanized Gaul. Study of the inscription, with the typically Gallic name of the deceased's father and the absence of the tria nomina typical of Roman citizens, dates the piece to the 1st century.

This is one of the very few surviving funerary monuments from the Roman period in this region, and according to Élisabeth Deniaux, writing in 1984-1985, it is “the most remarkable Roman funerary ensemble in Lower Normandy”.

== History ==
=== Dating the ancient necropolis ===
The topography of the ancient city of Lisieux has been relatively well known since the work of François Cottin in 1956 and Claude Lemaître in the 1980s.

Map of Gallo-Roman Lisieux. The Grand Jardin necropolis is at no. 5.

The cemeteries of the Gallo-Roman city extend north of the town, from Camp Franc to Les Buissonnets. Several necropolises have been identified: one on the site of the present-day commune of Saint-Désir, in a field known as Funèbre; another, unexcavated, at the corner of rue Pont-Mortain and the present-day Place François-Mitterrand, with sarcophagi from the Merovingian period but, according to François Cottin, used as early as the Lower Roman Empire: the necropolis is located between the port, the Orbiquet and the Chapelle Saint-Aignan, “the oldest known religious building in our town”. A third, very important cemetery, used from the 5th to the 9th century, was uncovered on the site of the Michelet school in the 1990s.

The Grand-Jardin cemetery covers a fairly large area and the excavations yielded some 2,000 complete objects. According to Claude Lemaître, this large amount of ceramic material dates from the ith century, and includes few sigillated ceramics: there are vases with stamps, but common ceramics dominate. Due to the dispersal of material from the excavations, it is “futile to attempt to reconstruct the organization and chronology of the site”. The most recent coin discovered dates from the reign of Tetricus I, and no items dating from after the 2nd century have been found.

The collections from the Grand-Jardin necropolis in Lille date from the 1st and 2nd centuries. The second half of the first century saw widespread use of locally produced ceramics. The 2nd century is only attested by coins. All kinds of ceramics are used for funerary purposes. The use of the necropolis is dated from the middle of the 1st to the end of the 2nd century, as in the last decade of this century, inhumation replaced cremation in the area of the future Normandy. These inhumation tombs created above cremation burials are cited as early as 1846.

Dating the stele is difficult, as researchers can only rely on the representation of the headdresses. Some funerary stelae were used in the Late Roman period, when the town was walled. A funerary element was found in 1911 on rue Pont-Mortain, but lost during the 1944 bombardments.

=== Rediscover ===
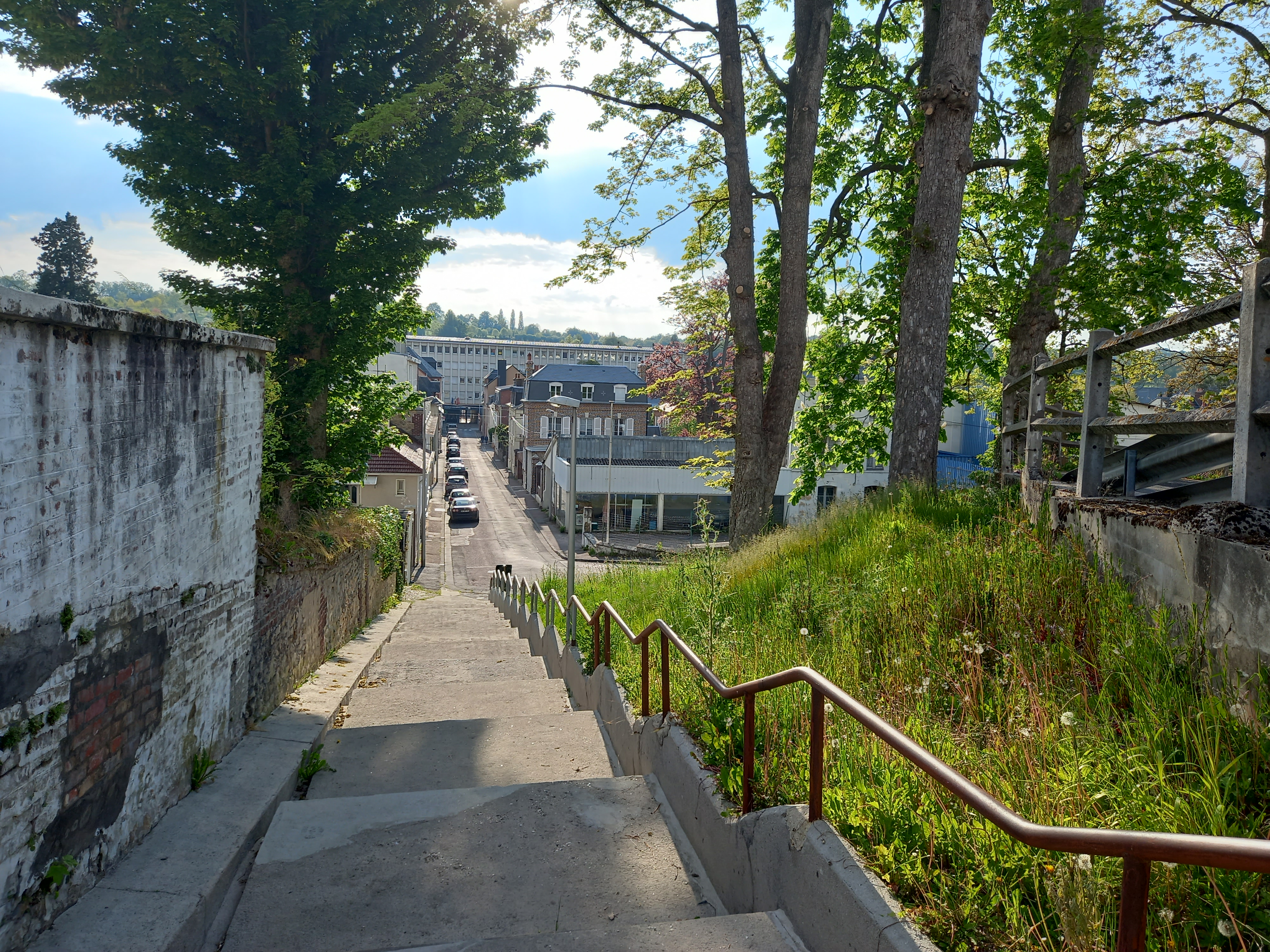
Part of the site of the Grand Jardin Roman necropolis in Lisieux.

The discovery site is located on a hillside to the north of the ancient city, at Le Grand Jardin. The Roman cemetery to the north of the town extends as far as Les Buissonnets.

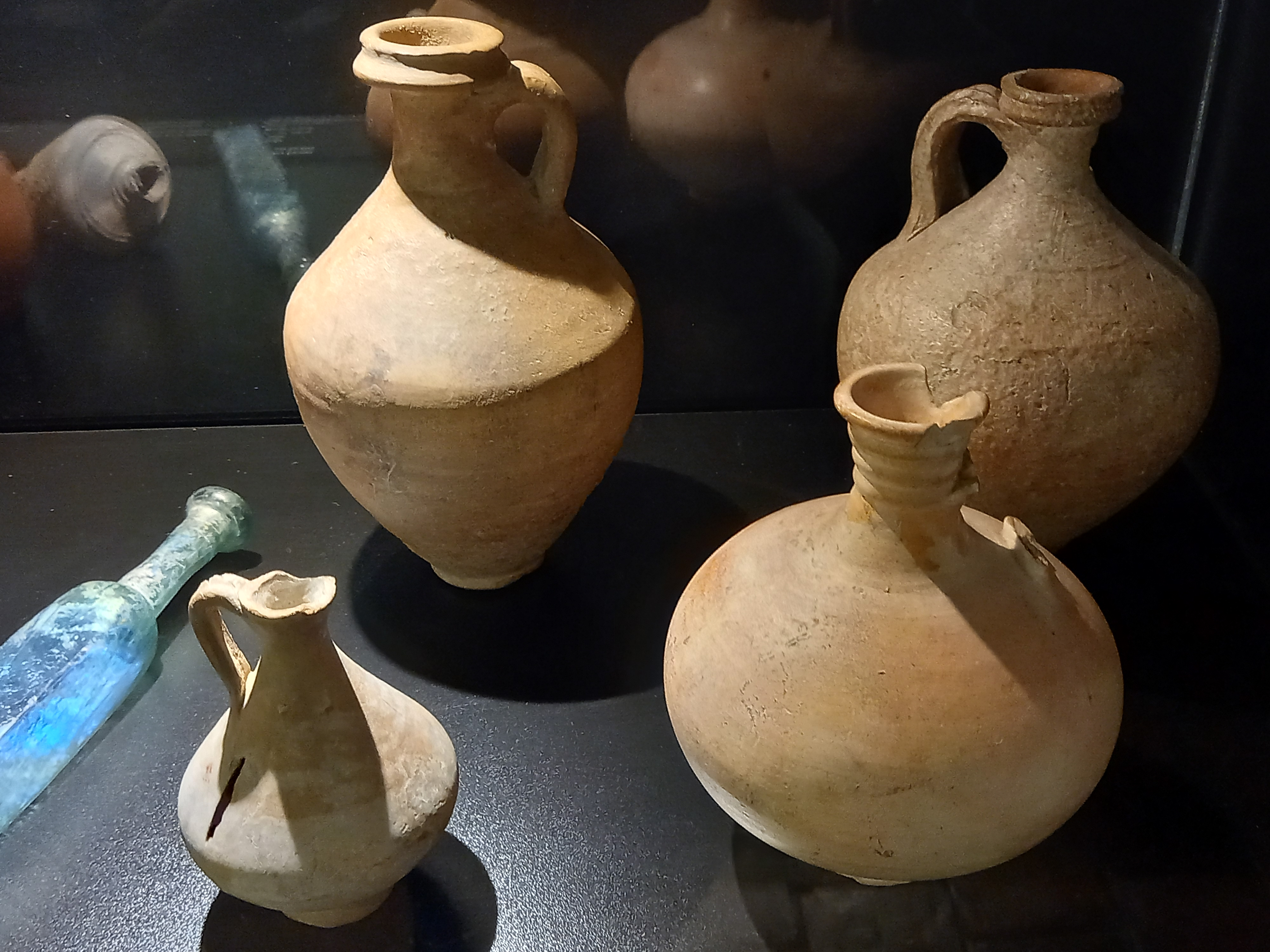
Ceramics excavated from the necropolis and preserved at the Musée d'art et d'histoire de Lisieux.

The necropolis was discovered on the Grand-Jardin site in 1846. Exploration began in 1861 by “a small group of collectors and local scholars” and continued until 1880. The ruthless 1861 excavations resulted in the destruction of many vases that had contained ashes. Only the Vostrus stele was preserved thanks to three people, including Arcisse de Caumont. Many objects found their way into private collections, but four institutions preserved elements of the excavations: part of the proceeds from the May–June 1861 campaign, sold to the Société française d'archéologie, was transferred to the Société des antiquaires de Normandie, where some 15 artifacts were preserved. The 1866 campaign resulted in discoveries sold to the Lille Museum in 1869. Several campaigns took place in 1868, with the proceeds going to the Lille Museum and the Rouen Museum of Antiquities. In 1916, the town of Lisieux bought some items from the heirs of one of the excavators, and by the end of the 20th century, the town's museum held only “shreds ”.

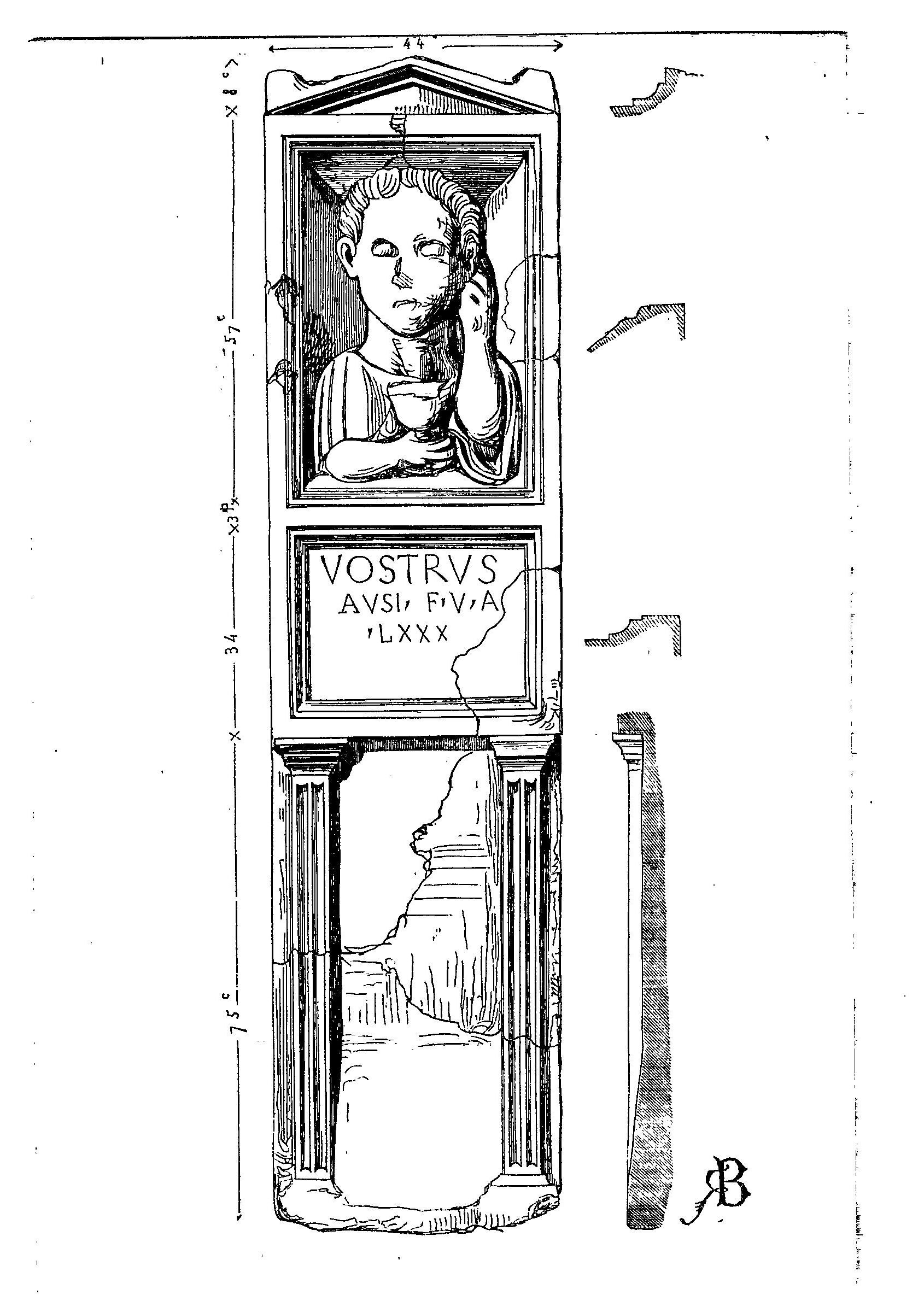
The stele in the Bulletin monumental publication of 1862.

The stele was discovered between April and June 1861, at Madame Leroy-Beaulieu's home and at a depth of 0.50 m, face down in the Grand-Jardin necropolis, during the opening of a street but with no further details as to its precise location or whether it was in its original position or not. At the same depth, seven red or grey earthen urns were found, containing “ashes and charred bones ” and a bronze coin representing Antoninus the PiousI 3. According to Arthème Pannier, the stele stood on the edge of a 9.50 m-wide road running north-south, and underneath it were found “fragments of urns and Roman bricks”. The street that was to be opened up was located “in the axis of rue Basse-Navarin”. Nearby, a child's burial site was uncovered, with furniture including a bell and a toy in the shape of a small terracotta horse. Excavations in 1861 yielded bronze objects, staples, rings and a hairpin. A sum of money was made available by the French Archaeological Society to purchase the stele and prevent its destruction. The decision was taken to transfer it to Caen, as there was no lapidary museum in Lisieux.

It was published by Arthème Pannier in 1862, who dated it to the end of the 1st centuryI 4 or the end of the 1st-beginning of the 2nd century, then by Antoine Charma; it was also published in Bulletin monumental, then Statistique monumentale du Calvados. Delaporte published his work in 1869. The stele was designed by Georges Bouet and R. Bordeaux, and this representation makes the face of the deceased more visible than the preserved work. The stele was deposited with other funerary urns discovered nearby in 1846 at the Musée des antiquaires de Normandie in Caen. The stele is published in Émile Espérandieu's Recueil général des bas-reliefs, statues et bustes de la Gaule romaine. The museum was partly destroyed and its collections partly dispersed during the Battle of Caen in 1944. The stele joined the collections of the Musée de Normandie when the collections of this learned society were deposited in 1983.

== Description ==
=== General description ===
The limestone stele is both an inscription and a funerary monument. The bust is carved in bas-relief. The representation of the deceased is damaged.

The stele was heavily damaged in 1944, if we compare its current state with the way it was depicted in the 19th century. The Vostrus stele is listed in Corpus Inscriptionum Latinarum, vol. XIII, under no. 3180.

The stele measures 1.78 m high by 0.44 m wide. The thickness is 0.11 m.

=== Various elements ===
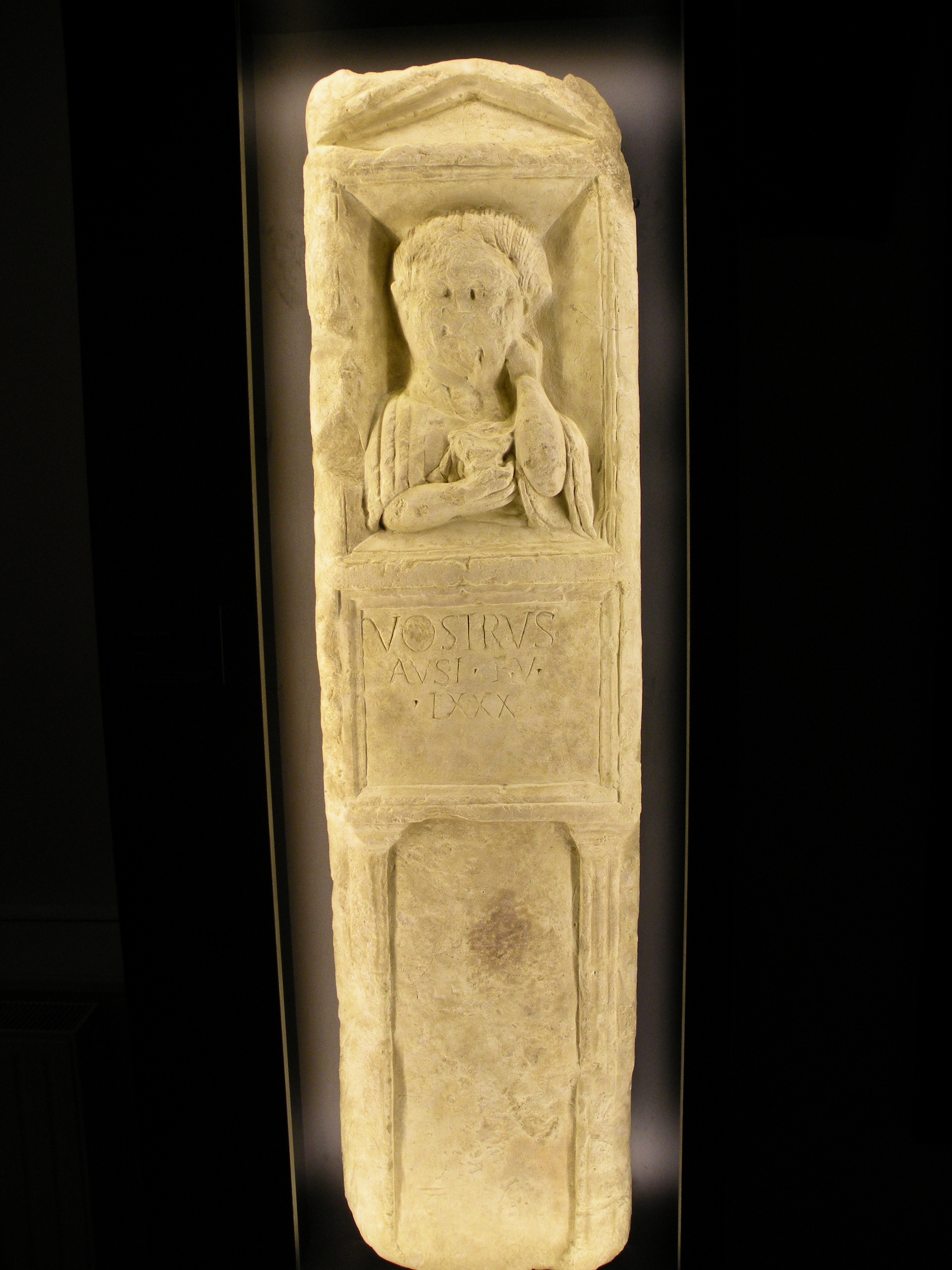
Cast of the stele at the Musée d'Art et d'Histoire de Lisieux.

It is made up of three elements: a 0.75 m high plinth is flanked by two 0.05 m wide pilasters adorned with 0.04 m high Tuscan capitals; above this is the 0.34 m high quadrilateral cartouche in which the inscription is found. Above, in a niche set in a quadrilateral 0.57 m high, the deceased is depicted holding a cup in his right hand, his fingers crudely depicted, and his left arm raised close to his face. The figure is standing on a table. The trunk is depicted almost entirely, over a height of 0.44 m, including 0.23 m for the head alone. The portrait of the deceased is portrayed in relief with a certain “frontality”, the portrait is “rather frozen” and the clothes and hair are treated with “a certain stiffness”. The hair is arranged in strands approximately 0.03 m wide. The deceased is not wearing a toga, but a heavy sewn tunic.

Above, a triangular pediment 0.09 m high was surmounted by two acroteria. The pediment, perhaps sculpted, may also have featured pine cones, but the state of preservation of the work makes this uncertain.

The pilasters are Tuscan and fluted. The moldings have a cavet and two listels. The face is damaged, and the trunk is almost complete. The figure, 0.44 m high, is depicted in a frozen attitude, at a younger age than the deceased, and with a stiffness in the treatment of features, hairstyle and clothing.

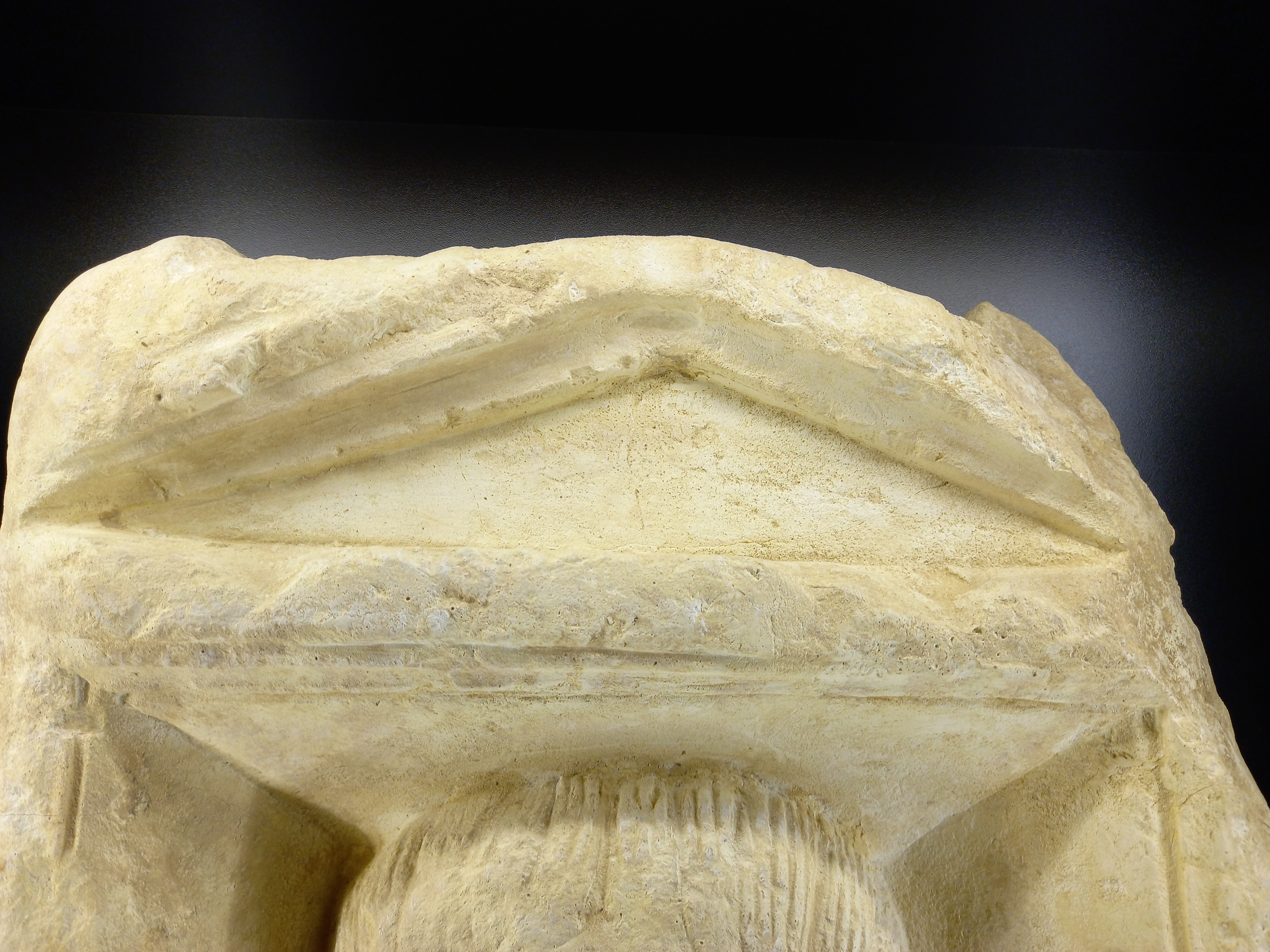
View of the pediment on the cast in the Musée de Lisieux.

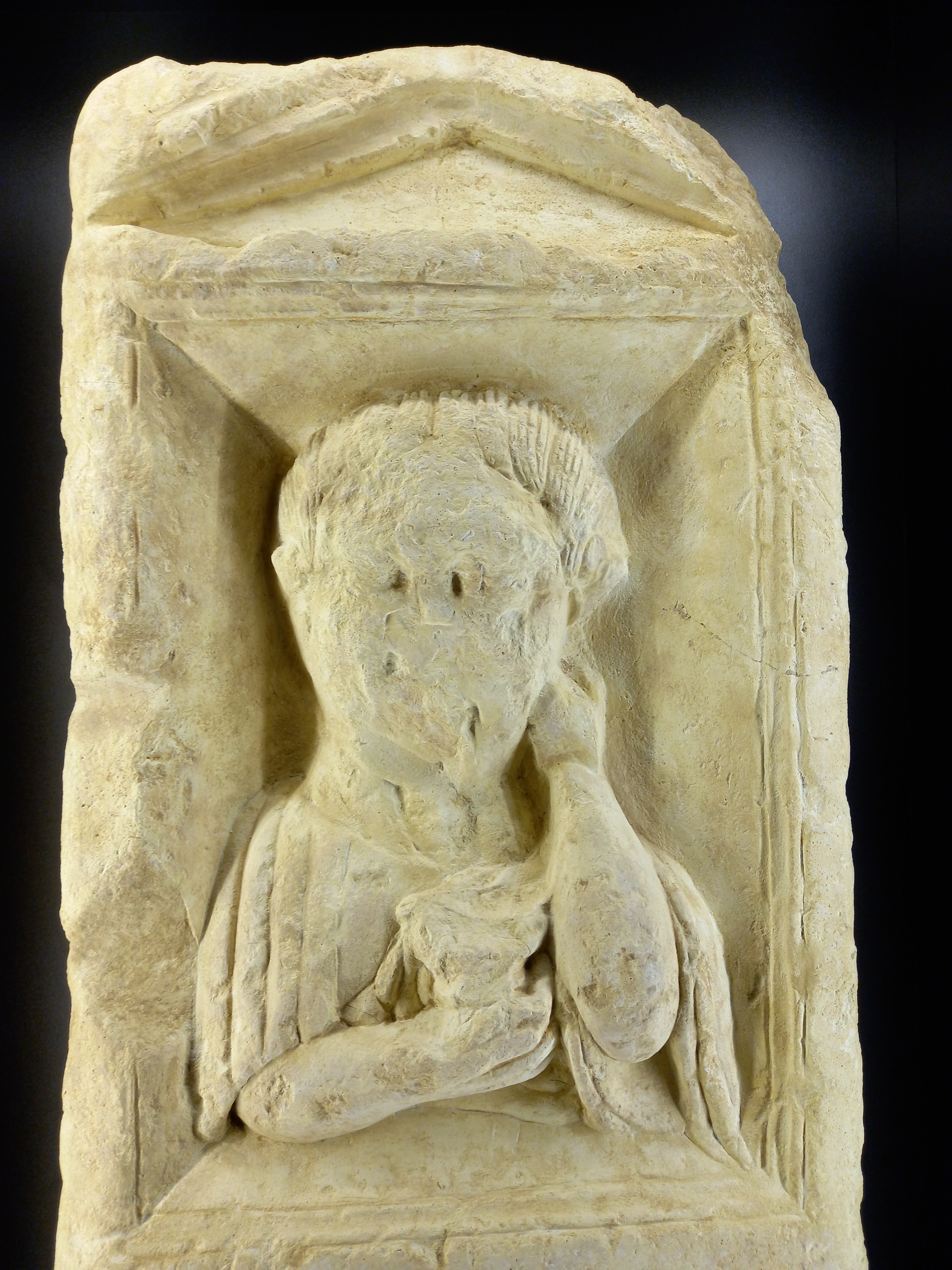
View of the niche with the figure and the upper part of the stele on the cast in the Musée de Lisieux.

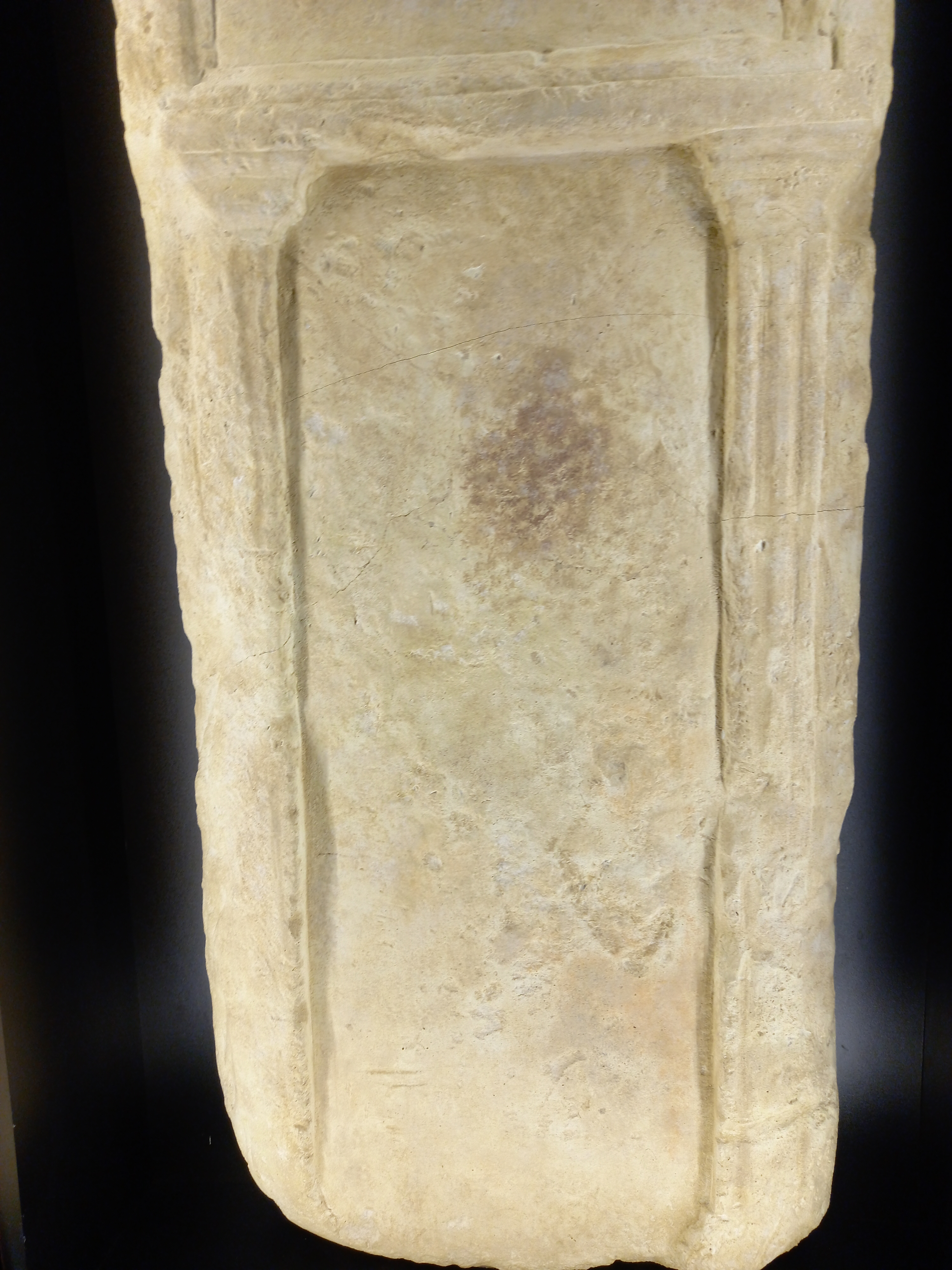
Base with Tuscan pilasters and capitals on the cast in the Musée de Lisieux.

Diagram showing the various parts of the stele.

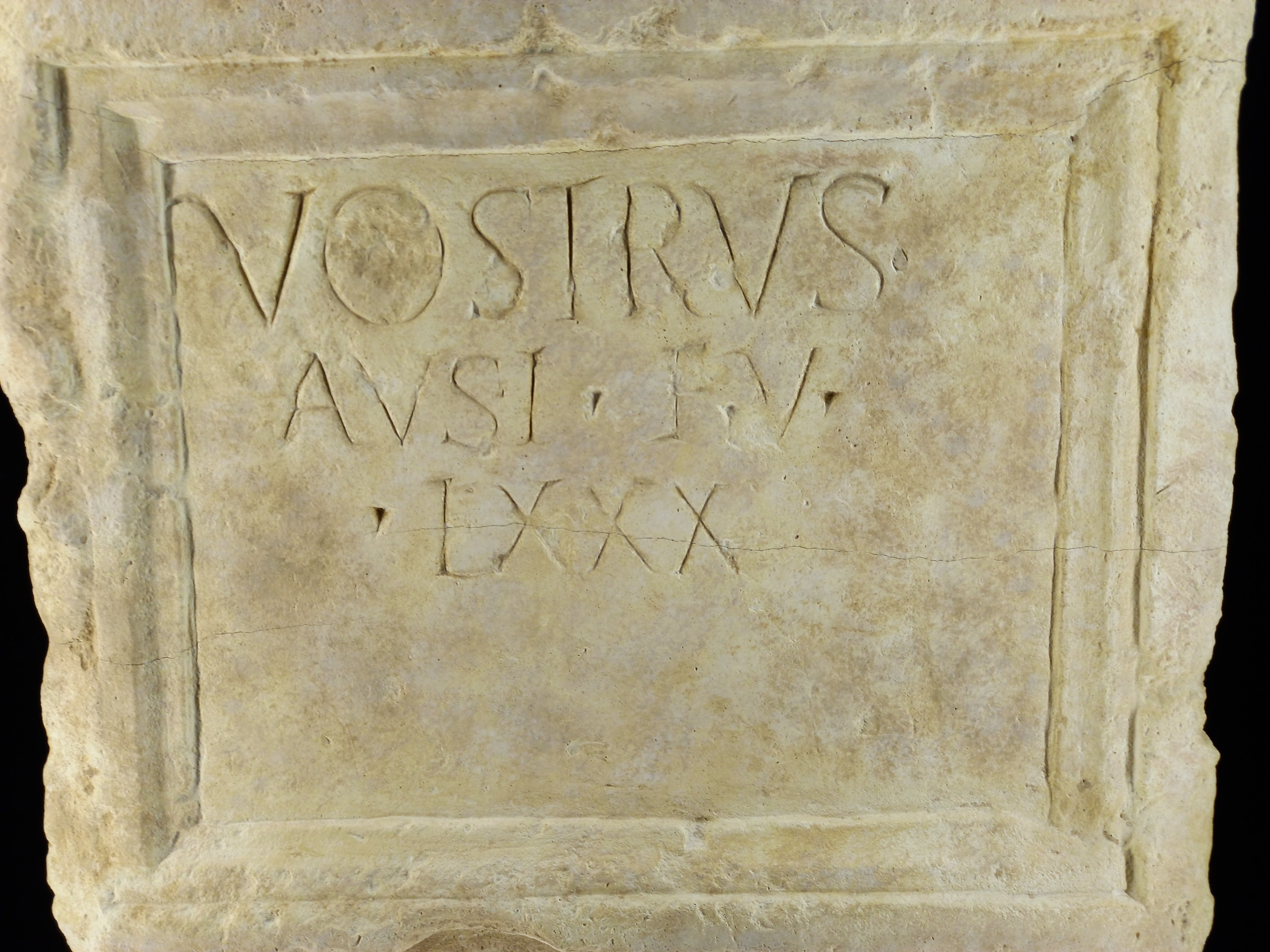
Detail of the inscription in its cartouche.

== Inscription ==
The inscription appears on three lines in the cartouche, decorated with a double molding. The letters on the first line measure 5.1 cm, while those on the other lines are 3.5 cm high.

The letters are engraved in capital letters and the text is in nominative form.

=== Text ===
VOSTRUS

AUSI.F.V.A.

LXXX.

=== Development ===
VOSTRUS

AUSI FILIUS

VIXIT ANNOS

LXXX.

=== Translation ===
"Vostrus, son of Ausus, lived 80 years ”.

== Interpretation ==
=== Witnessing death rituals ===
The funerary inscriptions from Vieux, discovered by the intendant Foucault, have been lost. Preserved funerary inscriptions from the Roman period are therefore rare in the area of former Basse-Normandie.

Representations of busts of the deceased date from the end of the Roman Republic, according to Élisabeth Deniaux, with portraits being shown during funeral processions. Large families kept portraits of their ancestors, and these were displayed at the funeral ceremonies of their descendants.

The absence of any invocation of the gods Manes on the monument is a further element that supports the same 1st century dating.

The mention of age is also surprising for a person who was old at the time of his death, as this was often intended to underline “a premature death ”.

== See also ==
- History of Normandy
- Roman funerary practices
- Normandy Museum
- Archaeological Garden of the Hospital of Lisieux

== Bibliography ==
- de Caumont, Arcisse (1862). "Arrivée du tombeau de Vostrus au musée plastique de la Société française d'archéologie, à Caen". Bulletin monumental (in French). Vol. 28.
- Deniaux, Élisabeth (1984). « Stèle de Vostrus ». Art de Basse-Normandie.
- Deniaux, Elisabeth; Lorren, Claude; Bauduin, Pierre; Jarry, Thomas (2002). La Normandie avant les Normands, de la conquête romaine à l'arrivée des Vikings.
- Pannier, Arthème (1861). Notice sur les antiquités romaines découvertes à Lisieux en 1861.
- Lambert, Edouard (1869). Arrivée du tombeau de Vostrus au musée plastique de la Société française d'archéologie, à Caen.
- Cottin, François (1957). Noviomagus Lexioviorum des temps les plus anciens à la fin de l'époque romaine.
- Blaszkiewicz, Patrick; David, Patrick; Jigan et, Claude; Marin, Jean-Yves (1986). Quelques données nouvelles sur la nécropole gallo-romaine du Grand-Jardin à Lisieux (Calvados) : la collection Delaporte du musée de Lille.
- Lemaître, Claude (1984). " Lisieux dans l'Antiquité ". Art de Basse-Normandie.
- Collectif (2001). Le patrimoine des communes du Calvados. Paris: Flohic. ISBN 2-84234-111-2.
- Blaszkiewicz, Patrick; David, Patrick; Jigan, Claude; Marin, Jean-Yves (1986). « Quelques données nouvelles sur la nécropole gallo-romaine du Grand-Jardin à Lisieux (Calvados) : la collection Delaporte du musée de Lille », Revue archéologique de l'ouest, no 3.
- Pannier, Arthème (1862). « Notice sur les antiquités romaines découvertes à Lisieux en 1861 ». Bulletin monumental.
- Delacampagne, Florence (1990). Carte archéologique de la Gaule, 14. Le Calvados, Paris. Éd. de la Maison des sciences de l'homme.
- Mandy, Bernard; Fichet de Clairefontaine, François (1994). « Stèle de Vostrus ». Lisieux avant l'an mil.
