= Suspensura =

Pier of bricks to support a floor over a hypocaust

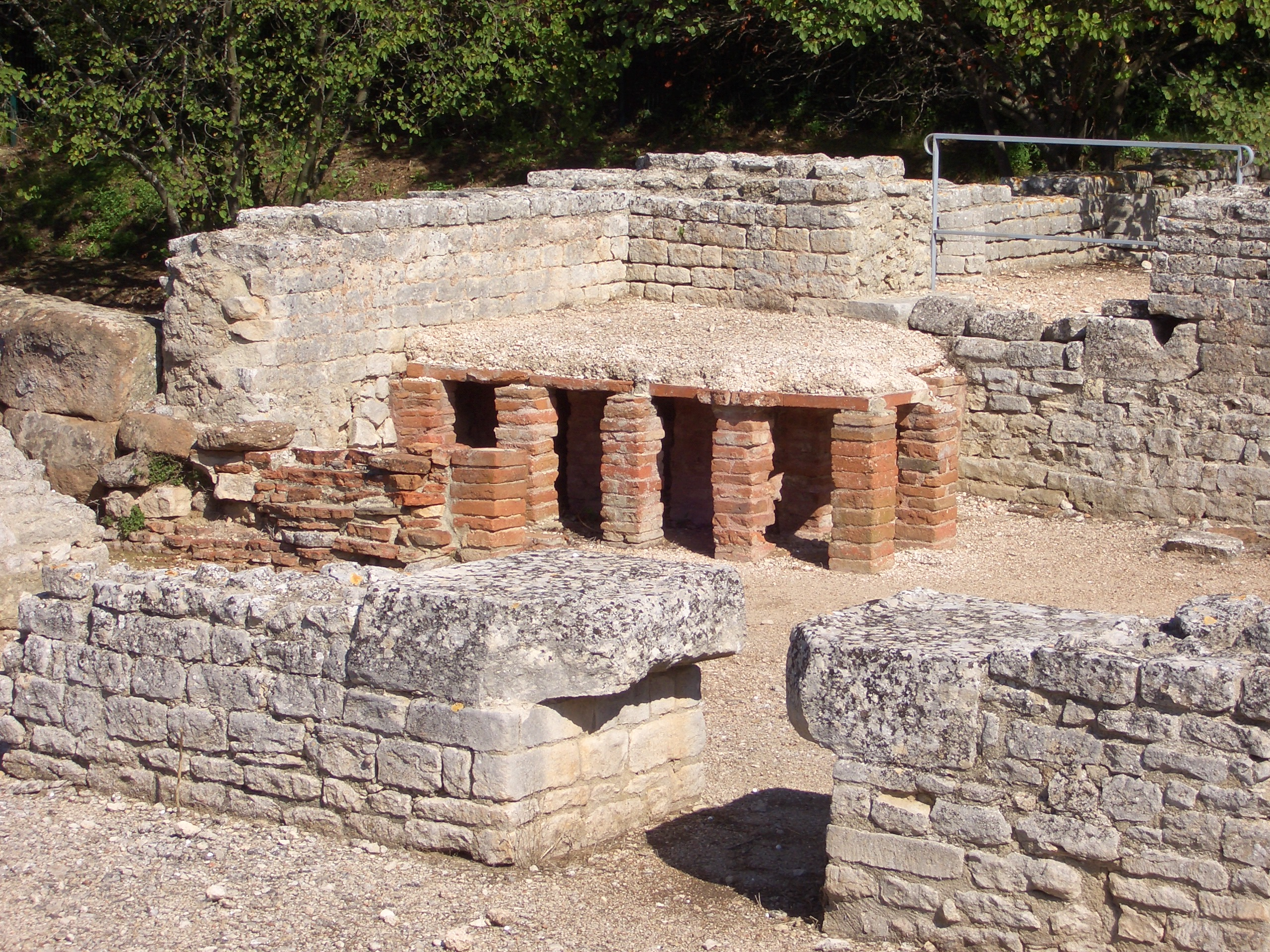
Remains of the thermae in Glanum, on the southern outskirts of Saint-Rémy-de-Provence, France

Suspensura is the architectural term given by Vitruvius to piers of square bricks (about 20 cm × 20 cm) that supported a suspended floor of a Roman bath covering a hypocaust cavity through which hot air would flow.
