= Robert-Bisson Hospital Centre =

Public hospital in Lisieux, Normandy, France

Geography
- Location: Lisieux, Calvados, Norme | addandy, Francress = 4 rue Roger-Aini, 14100 Lisieux
- Coordinates: 49.15°N 0.233333°E

Organisation
- Type: General Public hospital
- Affiliated university: Caen University Hospital

Services
- Emergency department: 24/7

History
- Opened: 1160

Links
- Website: www.ch-lisieux.fr

The Robert-Bisson Hospital Centre is a public hospital located in Lisieux, Calvados, in the Normandy region of France. It serves as the primary hospital for the eastern part of the Calvados department, catering to a population of approximately 138,170 residents as of 1999. Its area of influence extends into the Eure department, including the hospitals of Bernay and Pont-Audemer, and the northern part of the Orne department.

== Access ==
The Robert-Bisson Hospital Centre is served by Line 1 of the Lexobus urban bus network in Lisieux, providing convenient access for patients and visitors.

== History ==
The hospital's origins trace back to around 1160, when local merchant Roger Aini founded the Maison-Dieu in Lisieux, comprising a facility for the poor and a chapel, located within an area now defined by the streets Henry-Chéron, Docteur Degrenne, Pierre Colombe, and Poissonnerie. The chapel was consecrated by Bishop Arnulf of Lisieux in honor of Saint Thomas of Canterbury following his assassination on 29 December 1170. In June 1218, Bishop Jourdain du Hommet granted a perpetual endowment to the Maison-Dieu, entrusting its management to the Trinitarians in 1220.

In 1662, King Louis XIV mandated the establishment of general hospitals across France to care for the sick. A new hospital was constructed in Lisieux’s suburbs, at the current site, coexisting with the Trinitarian Maison-Dieu within the city walls. The Maison-Dieu was destroyed by fire in 1770, and by 1783, patients were transferred to the general hospital. The former Trinitarian site was demolished in 1841. On 18 June 1897, Henry Chéron secured approval for a hospital expansion. The cornerstone of the new pavilion-style hospital was laid on 27 July 1902 by Minister of Agriculture Léon Mougeot, and it was inaugurated in July 1904. Modernization began in 1959, with upgrades to existing buildings and the addition of three new pavilions. Under Mayor Robert Bisson’s leadership, construction of a new hospital commenced in 1966 and was inaugurated by Minister of Health Robert Boulin on 31 January 1971. Excavations during the demolition of the old hospital revealed remnants of a Gallo-Roman bath complex.

== Facilities and infrastructure ==
The Robert-Bisson Hospital Centre is centered around a nine-story tower known as the "Tripod," with wings oriented east, west, and north. Built in the 1970s, the main building has been expanded multiple times: in 1995 for the emergency department, in 2010 for the Mother-Child pavilion, and in 2012 with three additional floors above the emergency department.

Connected to the Tripod via a tunnel, the Nicolas-Vauquelin Pavilion houses nephrology-hemodialysis, short-stay geriatrics, a rehabilitation and follow-up care unit (SSR), and a cognitive-behavioral unit (UCC). Administrative services are located on the pavilion’s third floor. The hospital site also includes medico-social and long-stay facilities: the Jean-Devaux Pavilion, the Joseph-Colombe Pavilion, and the Cure House. A bust of Henry Chéron, a Lisieux native who served as a deputy, senator, and minister under the Third Republic, is displayed on the grounds.

== Administration ==
Administrative services are located on the third floor of the Nicolas-Vauquelin Pavilion.

=== List of directors ===
- Current Director: Nicolas Bougaut
- 2016–June 2019: E. Graindorge

=== Quality certification ===
The hospital has been certified at Level B by the Haute Autorité de Santé (High Authority for Health), with no reservations noted, and has incorporated minor recommendations into its ongoing action plan.

== Medical services ==
The Robert-Bisson Hospital Centre provides a wide range of medical services, including specialized and emergency care, as detailed below.

=== Cardiology ===
The cardiology department, located on the fourth floor of the Tripod, offers comprehensive cardiovascular care.

==== Inpatient unit ====
The cardiology inpatient unit, in the west wing of the fourth floor, has a standard capacity of 25 beds, expandable to 26 or 27 during high patient volumes. It manages conditions such as myocardial infarction, arrhythmias, heart failure, and other cardiac disorders. Lacking a dedicated cardiac intensive care unit (USIC), the hospital maintains six continuous care beds with cardio-tension monitoring. For acute myocardial infarction cases, it collaborates with the Caen University Hospital and the Saint-Martin private hospital in Caen for timely coronary angiography transfers.

==== Outpatient consultations ====
Cardiology specialists provide outpatient consultations for post-hospitalization follow-ups and routine care.

==== Cardiac diagnostic laboratories ====
Located in the north wing of the fourth floor, these laboratories offer exercise stress tests using an ergometer bicycle or treadmill and place ECG or blood pressure Holter monitors.

=== ENT, Stomatology, and Cervico-Facial surgery ===
The ENT, stomatology, and cervico-facial surgery department, located on the sixth floor of the Tripod, provides specialized care for ear, nose, throat, and facial conditions, including surgical interventions and outpatient consultations.

=== Orthopedic surgery ===
The orthopedic surgery department, on the seventh floor of the Tripod’s east wing, specializes in the treatment of musculoskeletal disorders, offering both surgical and non-surgical interventions for conditions such as fractures, joint replacements, and spinal issues.

=== Visceral surgery ===
Located on the seventh floor of the Tripod, the visceral surgery department focuses on surgical procedures involving abdominal organs, including the stomach, intestines, liver, and pancreas, addressing conditions such as appendicitis, hernias, and cancers.

=== Gastroenterology ===
The gastroenterology department, situated on the fifth floor, provides diagnostic and therapeutic services for digestive system disorders, including endoscopy, treatment of inflammatory bowel disease, and management of liver conditions.

=== Gynecology and obstetrics ===
The hospital operates a Level 2b maternity unit on the ground floor, providing comprehensive care for pregnancy, childbirth, and gynecological conditions, with facilities for neonatal care and high-risk pregnancies.

=== Medical imaging ===
Located on the ground floor opposite the gynecology-obstetrics department, the medical imaging department offers diagnostic services, including X-rays, CT scans, MRIs, and ultrasounds, supporting various medical specialties.

=== Laboratory ===
The laboratory, on the first floor of the Tripod, conducts analyses for the hospitals of Lisieux and Pont-l'Évêque and provides outpatient blood testing services, supporting diagnostic needs across multiple specialties.

=== Internal medicine and diabetology ===
The internal medicine and diabetology department, located on the fifth floor, manages complex medical conditions and provides specialized care for diabetes, including patient education and chronic disease management.

=== Neurology, Rheumatology, and Neurovascular unit ===
The neurology, rheumatology, and neurovascular unit, including a Neurovascular Intensive Care Unit (USINV), is located on the fifth floor of the Tripod.

==== Inpatient units ====
The neurology and rheumatology inpatient unit, in the east wing of the fifth floor, has a capacity of 23 beds since 7 November 2016 (10 for neurology and rheumatology, 9 for the neurovascular unit, and 4 for neurovascular intensive care), expandable to 24 or 25 during peak demand. The neurovascular intensive care unit, opened on 5 November 2012 as part of the 2010–2014 National Stroke Action Plan, includes two beds in single rooms within the continuous care unit on the third floor, north wing. The unit manages conditions such as stroke, Parkinson's disease, multiple sclerosis, cognitive impairments in younger patients, and other neurological or rheumatological disorders. The hospital participates in a regional stroke care network.

==== Outpatient consultations ====
Specialists provide outpatient consultations in neurology and rheumatology.

==== Neurological diagnostic laboratories ====
Located in the north wing of the fifth floor, these laboratories include facilities for electroencephalography (EEG), electromyography (EMG), and evoked potentials testing.

==== Rankings ====
- 2013–2014:
  - Stroke: 53rd in the Nouvel Observateur hospital rankings.
  - Multiple Sclerosis: 55th in the Nouvel Observateur hospital rankings.
  - Balance Disorders (with ENT surgery): 65th in the Nouvel Observateur hospital rankings.

=== Pediatrics and Neonatology ===
The pediatrics and neonatology department, located on the ground floor, provides care for infants and children, including a Level 2b neonatal unit for premature and high-risk newborns. Services include inpatient treatment, outpatient consultations, and emergency pediatric care.

=== Pulmonology ===
The pulmonology department, on the sixth floor of the Tripod’s west wing, specializes in respiratory conditions, offering diagnostics and treatment for diseases such as asthma, chronic obstructive pulmonary disease, and lung infections.

=== Emergency department ===
The emergency department, open 24/7 on the ground floor, north side of the Tripod, includes a medico-psychological unit, trauma rooms, and a SAMU14 mobile emergency unit with an on-site SMUR vehicle. It has six short-stay hospitalization beds (UHCD) and manages pediatric trauma and in-hospital critical emergencies.

=== Intensive Care and Continuous Care unit ===
Opened on 2 October 2012, the intensive care and continuous care unit, located on the third floor, north wing of the Tripod, comprises 14 beds: eight for intensive care and six for continuous care. It addresses patients with acute organ failure requiring continuous monitoring or life-support interventions and manages in-hospital critical emergencies.

=== Other services ===
==== Addiction and alcohol treatment ====
The addiction and alcohol treatment unit provides specialized care, including counseling, detoxification, and outpatient support for substance use disorders.

==== French Blood Establishment (EFS) ====
The Tripod’s first floor previously hosted a French Blood Establishment (EFS) branch for the Normandy region, replaced by a blood depot in mid-2019 to support transfusion needs.

==== Mobile pain and Palliative Care Unit ====
The mobile pain and palliative care unit offers interdisciplinary support for patients with chronic pain or terminal illnesses, focusing on symptom management and quality of life.

== Information systems ==
The hospital employs several information systems to manage patient records and operations, including DMU, Pastel, Medis, and Crystalnet, enhancing efficiency and coordination across departments.

== Training ==
=== Medical training ===
The hospital serves as a training center for medical professionals, offering clinical placements and continuing education for doctors and specialists in collaboration with regional medical schools.

=== Paramedical training ===
==== Nursing Training Institute (IFSI) ====
The Nursing Training Institute (IFSI) provides a three-year program for nursing students, combining theoretical education with practical training to prepare them for professional practice.

==== Assistant Nurse Training Institute (IFAS) ====
The Assistant Nurse Training Institute (IFAS) offers a one-year program for assistant nurses, focusing on basic care skills and patient support, with practical training conducted within the hospital.

== Notable figures associated with the hospital ==
- Robert Bisson, namesake of the hospital.
- Henry Chéron, whose bust is displayed on the hospital grounds.
- Jean Devaux, namesake of a long-stay pavilion.
- Joseph Colombe, namesake of a long-stay pavilion.
- Nicolas Vauquelin, namesake of a hospital pavilion.
- Roger Aini, namesake of the street where the hospital is located.

== See also ==
- List of hospitals in France
- Healthcare in France
- Normandy
- Lisieux
- Public hospital
- Maternity hospital
- Emergency department
- Intensive care unit
