= List of hospitals in France =

This is a list of hospitals in France with sorting by city and name.

As of 2004, about 62 percent of French hospital capacity was met by publicly owned and managed hospitals. The remaining capacity was split evenly (18 percent each) between non-profit sector hospitals (which are linked to the public sector and which tend to be owned by foundations, religious organizations or mutual-insurance associations) and by for-profit institutions. Because the insurance is compulsory, the system is effectively financed by general taxation rather than traditional insurance (as typified by automobile or home insurance, where risk levels determine premiums).

== Hospitals in France ==
Notable Hospitals in France
Name	City Location	Year opened
American Hospital of Paris	Paris, Neuilly-sur-Seine	1907
Amiens University Hospital	Amiens	
Angers University Hospital (in partnership with the University of Angers)	Angers	1432 (about)
Beaujon Hospital	Paris, Clichy	1935
Bicêtre Hospital	Paris, Le Kremlin-Bicêtre	1656
Broussais University Hospital	Paris	
Central Hospital	Alès	
Central Hospital	Bagnols-sur-Cèze	
Centre Hôspitalier de Cannes	Cannes	
Centre Hospitalier Générale (CHG)	Albi	
Centre Hospitalier	Lourdes	
Centre hospitalier régional universitaire de Tours (in partnership with the University of Tours)	Tours	1530
Centre hospitalier universitaire de Clermont-Ferrand (in partnership with Clermont Auvergne University)	Clermont-Ferrand	1767
Centre Hospitalier Sud Francilien	Corbeil-Essonnes	
Centre Hospitalier Universitaire de Caen	Caen	
CHU Poitiers	Poitiers	
Centre Hospital Universitaire Nice (Louis Pasteur)	Nice	
CHU Bordeaux	Bordeaux	
CHS	Sélestat	
Clinique Boneffon	Alès	
Clinique les Franciscaines	Nîmes	
Foch Hospital	Suresnes	1929
Grenoble University Hospital	Grenoble	
Groupe hospitalier Diaconesses Croix Saint-Simon (fr)	Paris	
Guingamp Hospital	Guingamp	
Henri Poincaré University Hospital	Nancy	
Hôpital d'instruction des armées Percy	Clamart	
Hôpital de Dubois Hautepierre Saints-Marguerite	Marseille	
Hôpital de Hautepierre	Strasbourg	
Hôpital de La Grave	Toulouse	1197
Hôpital des armées	Brest	
Hôpital Européen Georges-Pompidou	Paris	2001
Hospices Civils de Lyon	Lyon	1802
Hôpital de Chambéry	Chambéry	
Hospital Lapeyronie	Montpellier	
Hospital Saint Eloi	Montpellier	
Hôtel-Dieu de Paris	Paris	829
Institution Nationale des Invalides	Paris	1678
Jean Minjoz Hospital	Besançon	1983
Limoges University Hospital	Limoges	
Nantes University Hospital	Nantes	
Necker-Enfants Malades Hospital	Paris	1920
Paul Morel Hospital	vesoul	1938
Pitié-Salpêtrière Hospital	Paris	1656 (about)
Polyclinique du grand Sud	Nîmes	
Psychiatric Hospital Lacolombière	Montpellier	
Reims University Hospital	Reims	
René Dubois Hospital	Pontoise	
Rennes University Hospital	Rennes	
Robert-Bisson Hospital Centre	Lisieux, Calvados	1160
Rothschild Hospital	Paris	1850 (mid century)
Rouen University Hospital	Rouen	
Saint-Antoine University Hospital	Paris	
Tourcoing Hospital	Tourcoing	
University Hospital CAREMEAU	Nîmes	
University Hospital of Montpellier	Montpellier	1220 (about)
Val-de-Grâce (military hospital)	Paris	1796
Centre Hospitalier Intercommunal Aix-Pertuis	Aix-en-Provence	1518

== French Overseas departments and regions ==
Hospitals in Mayotte

- Hospital du Sud
- Dispensary De Sada
- Hospital De Dzaoudzi
- Medical Center Proximity M'tsangamouji

Hospitals in Martinique

- Martinique University Hospital (CHU)

Hospitals in Réunion

- Hospital Félix-Guyon
- Hospital Saint-Louis
- Hospital Sud Du Tampon
- St-Pierre Hospital

== See also ==
1*Health care in France

- History of hospitals
- History of medicine in France
