= Ancient Roman bathing =

Custom of ancient Roman society

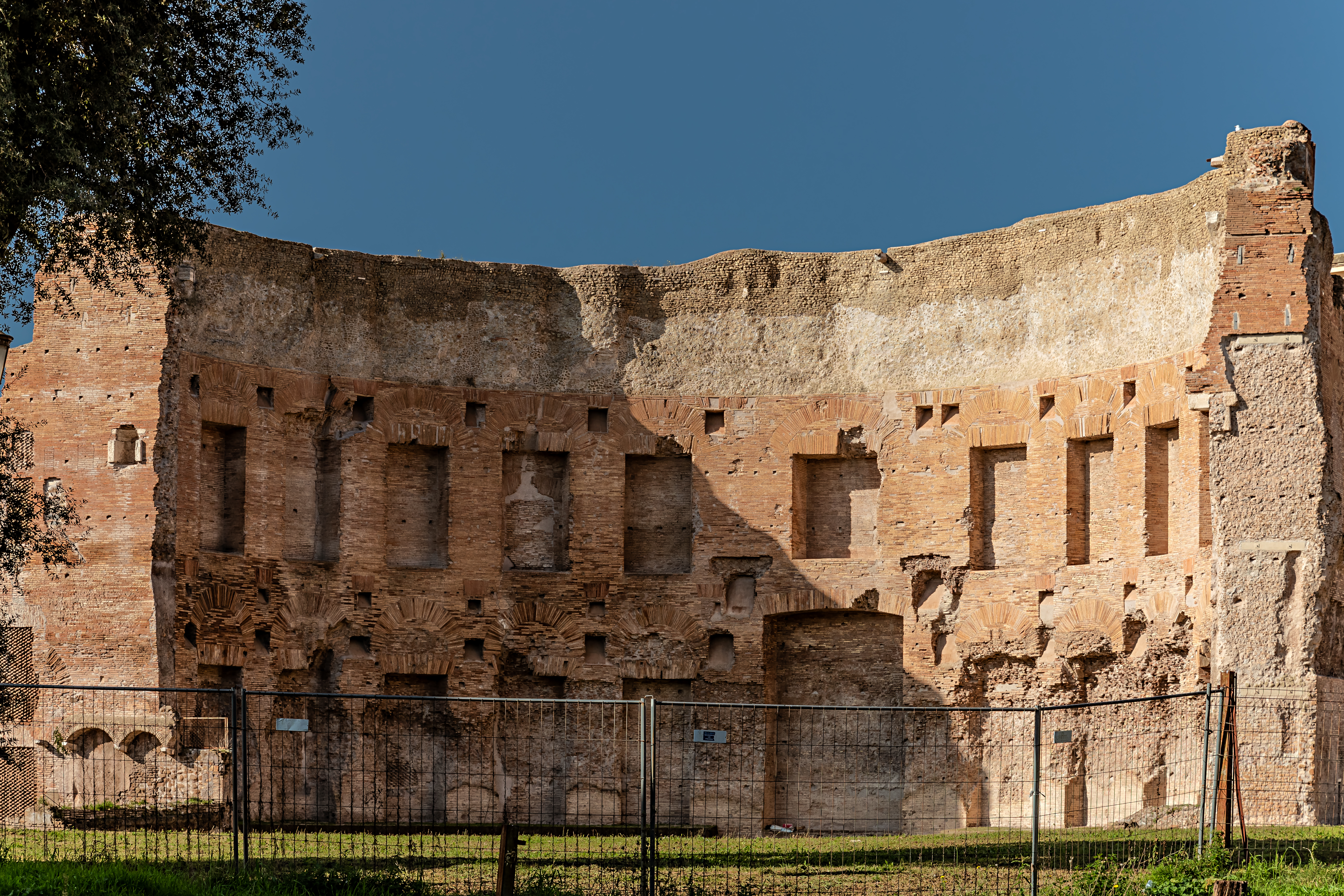
Remains of the Baths of Trajan, Rome

Bathing played a major part in ancient Roman culture and society. It was one of the most common daily activities and was practiced across a wide variety of social classes. Though many contemporary cultures see bathing as a private activity conducted in the home, bathing in Rome was a communal activity. While the extremely wealthy could afford bathing facilities in their homes, private baths were very uncommon, and most people bathed in the communal baths (thermae). In some ways, these resembled modern-day destination spas as there were facilities for a variety of activities from exercising to sunbathing to swimming and massage.

Such was the importance of baths to Romans that a catalogue of buildings in Rome from 354 AD documented 952 baths of varying sizes in the city. Public baths became common throughout the empire as a symbol of "Romanitas" or a way to define themselves as Roman. They were some of the most common and most important public buildings in the empire as some of the first buildings built after the empire would conquer a new area.

Although the wealthiest Romans might set up a bath in their townhouses or their country villas, heating a series of rooms or even a separate building especially for this purpose, and soldiers might have a bathhouse provided at their fort (as at Cilurnum on Hadrian's Wall, or at Bearsden fort), they still often frequented the numerous public bathhouses in the cities and towns throughout the empire.

Small bathhouses, called balneum (plural balnea), might be privately owned, while they were public in the sense that they were open to the populace for a fee. Larger baths called thermae were owned by the state and often covered several city blocks. The largest of these, the Baths of Diocletian, could hold up to 3,000 bathers. Fees for both types of baths were quite reasonable, within the budget of most free Roman males. Aristocratic Romans, particularly those seeking to build up popularity with the public come election time, often sponsored days where anyone could use the baths for free. Most Romans visited the baths frequently, often every day - when asked by a foreigner why he bathed once a day, a Roman emperor is said to have replied "Because I do not have the time to bathe twice a day."

== Greek influence ==
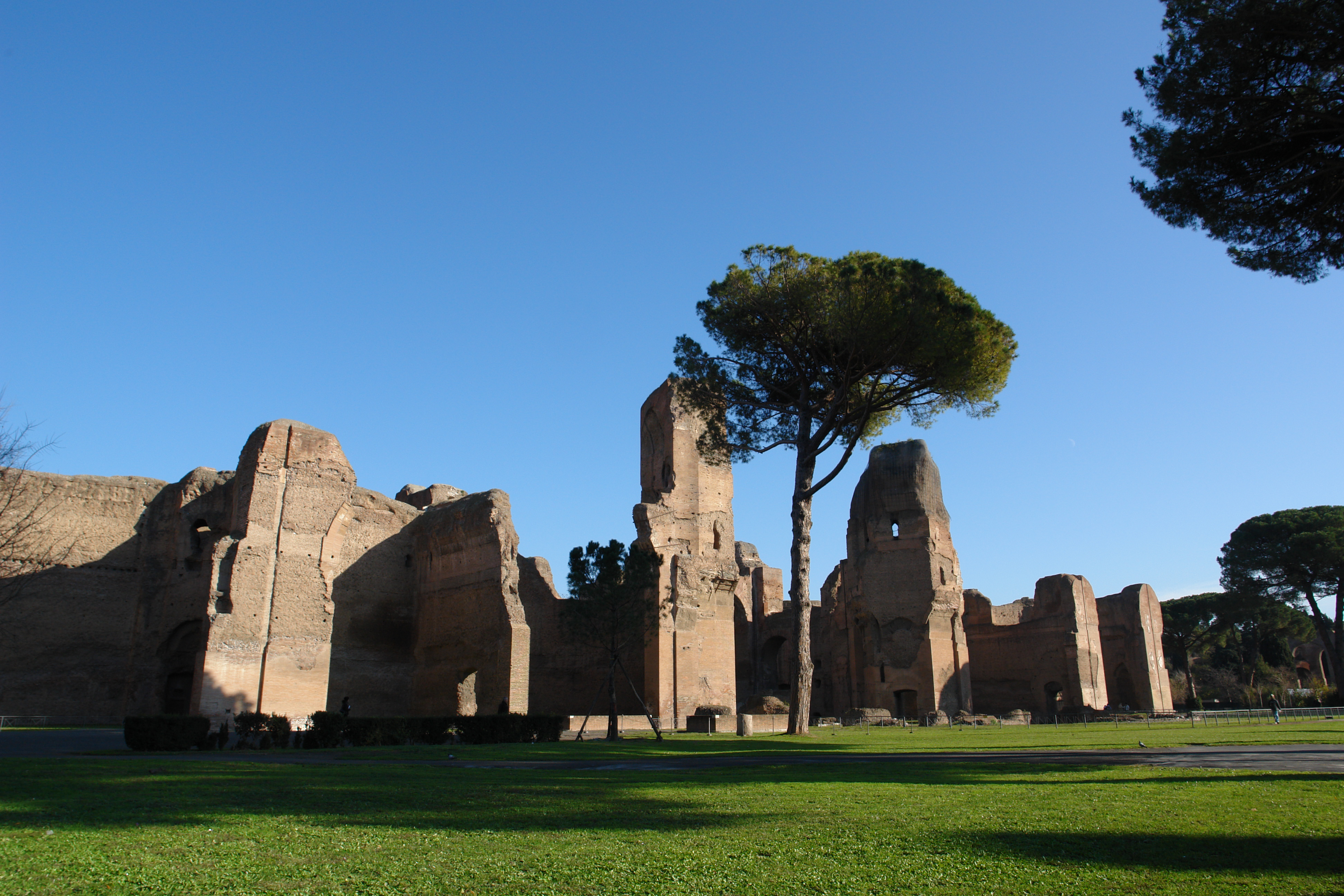
The Baths of Caracalla

Some of the earliest descriptions of western bathing practices came from Greece. The Greeks began bathing regimens that formed the foundation for modern spa procedures. These Aegean people utilized small bathtubs, washbasins, and foot baths for personal cleanliness. The earliest such findings are the baths in the palace complex at Knossos, Crete, and the luxurious alabaster bathtubs excavated in Akrotiri, Santorini; both date from the mid-2nd millennium BC. They established public baths and showers within their gymnasium complexes for relaxation and personal hygiene.

Greek mythology specified that certain natural springs or tidal pools were blessed by the gods to cure disease. Around these sacred pools, Greeks established bathing facilities for those desiring to heal. Supplicants left offerings to the gods for healing at these sites and bathed themselves in hopes of a cure. The Spartans developed a primitive steam bath. At Serangeum, an early Greek balneum (bathhouse, loosely translated), bathing chambers were cut into the hillside into the rock above the chambers held bathers' clothing. One of the bathing chambers had a decorative mosaic floor depicting a driver and chariot pulled by four horses, a woman followed by two dogs, and a dolphin below. Thus, the early Greeks used natural features, but expanded them and added their own amenities, such as decorations and shelves. During the later Greek civilization, bathhouses were often built in conjunction with athletic fields.

== Roman bathhouses ==
The Romans emulated many of the Greeks' bathing practices and surpassed them in the size of their baths. As in Greece, the Roman bath became a focal center for social and recreational activity. With the expansion of the Roman Empire, the idea of the public bath spread to all parts of the Mediterranean and into regions of Europe and North Africa. By constructing aqueducts, the Romans had enough water not only for domestic, agricultural, and industrial uses but also for their leisurely pursuits. Aqueducts provided water that was later heated for use in the baths. Today, the extent of the Roman bath is revealed at ruins and in archaeological excavations in Europe, Africa, and the Middle East.

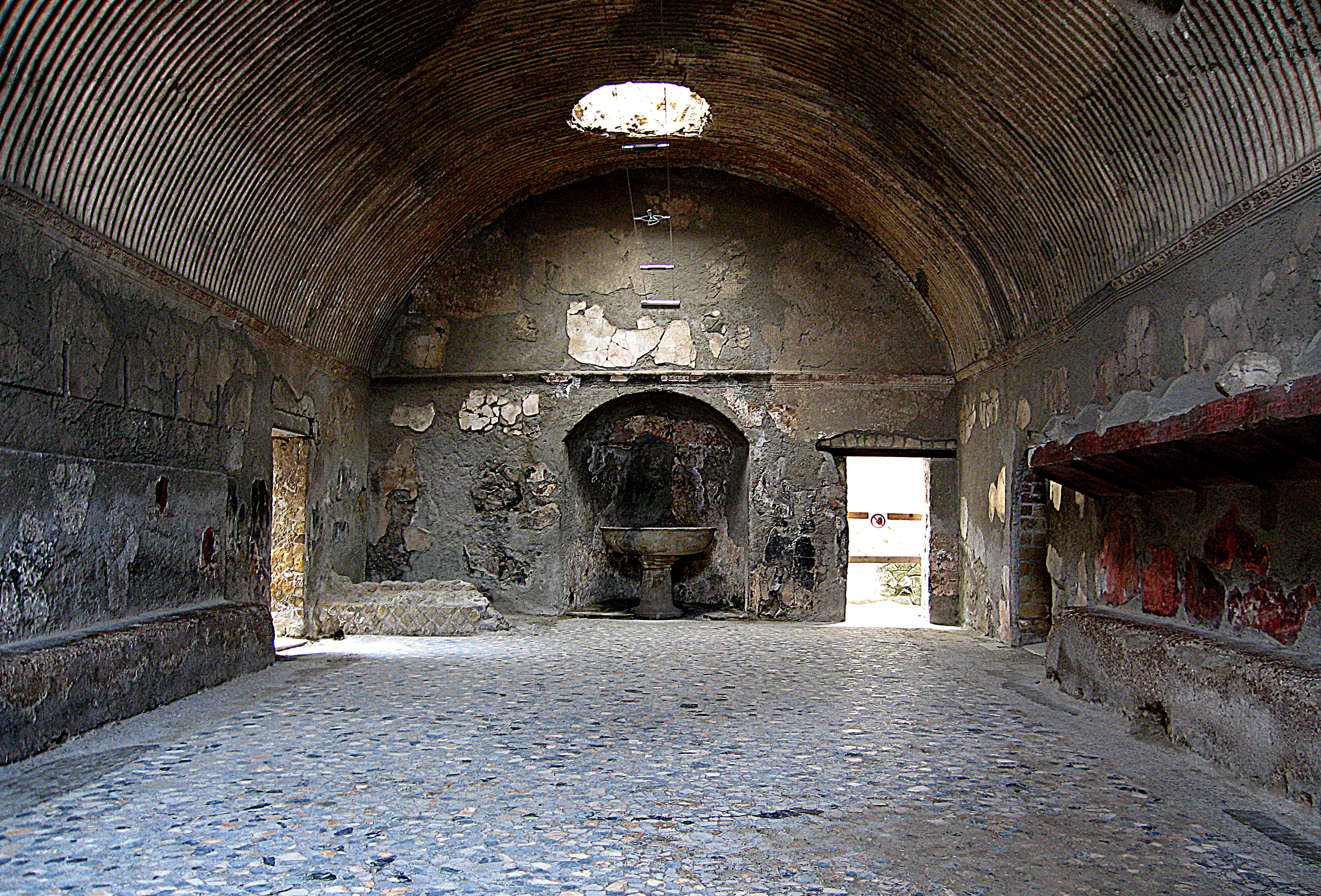
Apodyterium at Central Thermae (Herculaneum) – men's sector

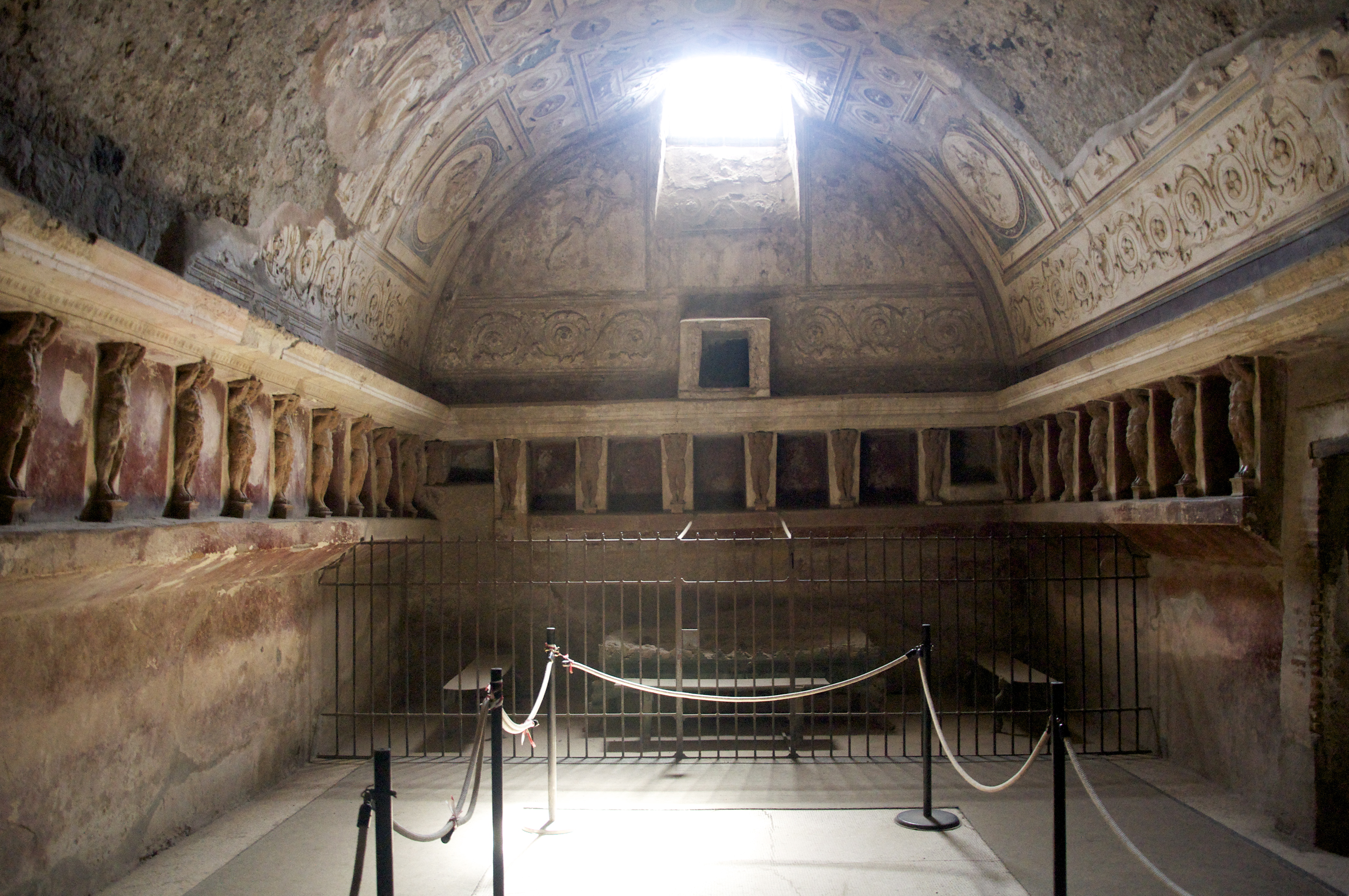
Tepidarium in the Forum Thermae at Pompeii

These Roman baths varied from simple to exceedingly elaborate structures, and they varied in size, arrangement, and decoration. Many historians construct a specific path which bathers would have taken through a Roman bath, but there is no fixed evidence that confirms any of these theories or that there even was a specific order to bathing practices. However, one of the most commonly interpreted sequences is shown next.

Most baths contained an apodyterium— a room just inside the entrance where the bather stored their clothes. This would often be the first room somebody visiting the baths would enter. Next, the bather progressed into the tepidarium (warm room), then into the caldarium (hot room) for a steam, and finally into the frigidarium (cold room) with its tank of cold water. The caldarium, heated by a brazier underneath the hollow floor, contained cold-water basins which the bather could use for cooling. After taking this series of sweat and/or immersion baths, the bather returned to the cooler tepidarium for a massage with oils and final scraping with metal implements called strigils. Some baths also contained a laconicum (a dry, resting room) where the bather completed the process by resting and sweating.

The layout of Roman baths contained other architectural features of note. Because wealthy Romans brought slaves to attend to their bathing needs, the bathhouse usually had three entrances: one for men, one for women, and one for slaves. The symmetry preference in Roman architecture usually meant a symmetrical facade, even though the women's area was usually smaller than the men's because of fewer patrons. Usually, solid walls or placement on opposite sides of the building separated the men's and women's sections. Roman bathhouses often contained a courtyard, or palaestra, which was an open-air garden used for exercise. In some cases, the builders made the palaestra an interior courtyard, and in other cases, they placed it in front of the bathhouse proper and incorporated it into the formal approach. Sometimes the palestra held a swimming pool. Most often a colonnade outlined the palaestra's edges.

Republican bathhouses often had separate bathing facilities for women and men, but by the 1st century AD mixed bathing was common and is a practice frequently referred to in Martial and Juvenal, as well as in Pliny and Quintilian. However, gender separation might have been restored by Emperor Hadrian, but there is evidence it wasn't. To many Roman moralists, baths illustrated how far the Rome of their own day had fallen into decline and so became a negative image; Cato the Elder publicly attacked Scipio Africanus for his use of the bathhouses.

Roman bathhouses offered amenities in addition to the bathing ritual. Ancillary spaces in the bathhouse proper housed food and perfume-selling booths, libraries, and reading rooms. Stages accommodated theatrical and musical performances. Adjacent stadia provided spaces for exercise and athletic competitions. Inside the bathhouses proper, marble mosaics tiled the elegant floors. The stuccoed walls frequently sported frescoes of trees, birds, and other pastoral images. Sky-blue paint, gold stars, and celestial imagery adorned interior domes. Statuary and fountains decorated the interior and exterior.

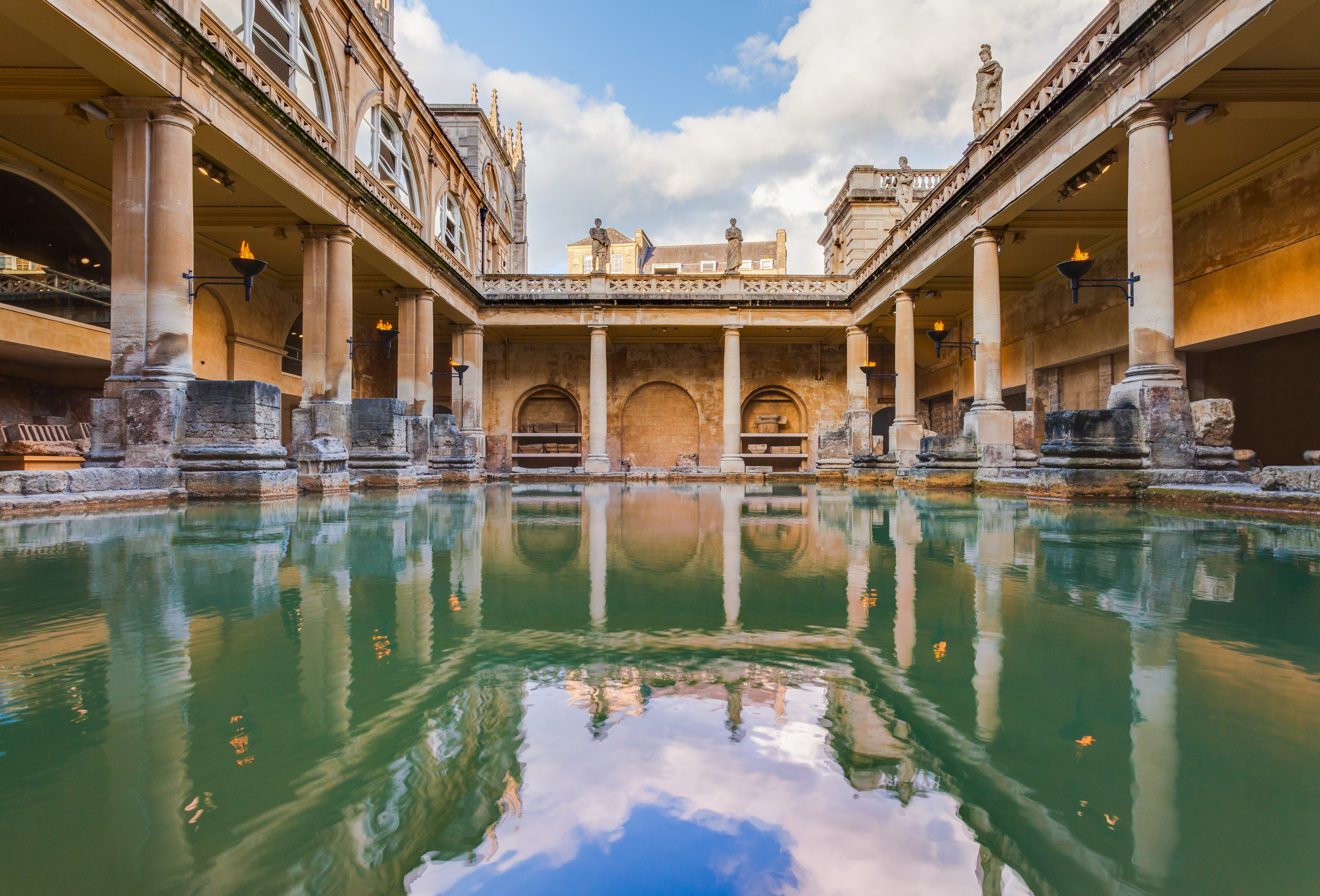
Roman baths in Bath, England

The Romans also constructed baths in their colonies, taking advantage of the natural hot springs occurring in North Africa, such as the Algerian Hammam Essalihine, as well as in Europe where they constructed baths at Aix-en-Provence and Vichy in France, Bath and Buxton in England, Aachen and Wiesbaden in Germany, Baden in Austria, and Aquincum in Hungary, among other locations. These baths became centers for recreational and social activities in Roman communities. Libraries, lecture halls, gymnasiums, and formal gardens became part of some bath complexes. In addition, the Romans used the hot thermal waters to relieve their suffering from rheumatism, arthritis, and overindulgence in food and drink.

Thus, the Romans elevated bathing to fine art, and their bathhouses physically reflected these advancements. The Roman bath, for instance, included a far more complex ritual than a simple immersion or sweating procedure. The various parts of the bathing ritual (undressing, bathing, sweating, receiving a massage and resting), required separated rooms which the Romans built to accommodate those functions. The segregation of the sexes and the additions of diversions not directly related to bathing also directly impacted the shape and form of bathhouses. The elaborate Roman bathing ritual and its resultant architecture served as precedents for later European and American bathing facilities. Formal garden spaces and opulent architectural arrangement equal to those of the Romans reappeared in Europe by the end of the eighteenth century. Major American spas followed suit a century later.

== Roman bathing practices ==
There were many activities that occurred in a Roman bathing complex that differ from modern conceptions of bathing. It was common for the people of Ancient Rome to spend a lot of time at the baths because of all of the different aspects to the complex, but it is unclear whether or not it was required for a person to spend this much time at every visit to the baths. The process of going to the baths could be described as a cross between working out at the gym, going to the spa, meeting friends for social activities, and bathing.

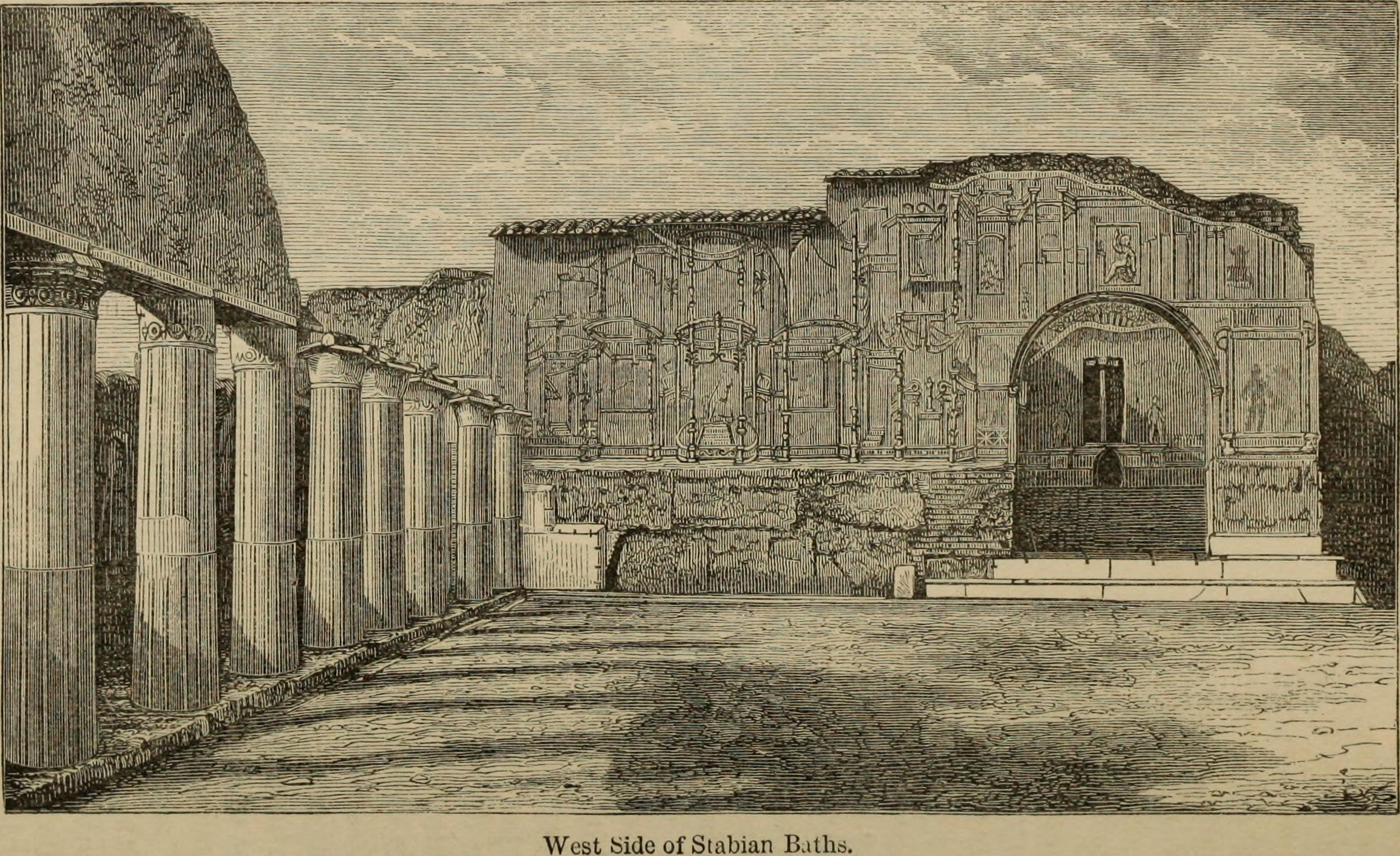
The palaestra at the Stabian Baths in Pompeii.

Inside the baths, visitors were usually completely nude, thus removing the indications of class difference usually found in clothing. At times throughout the empire, it was even common for women and men to bathe together at the same time, although there are other indications of separate facilities for women and men.

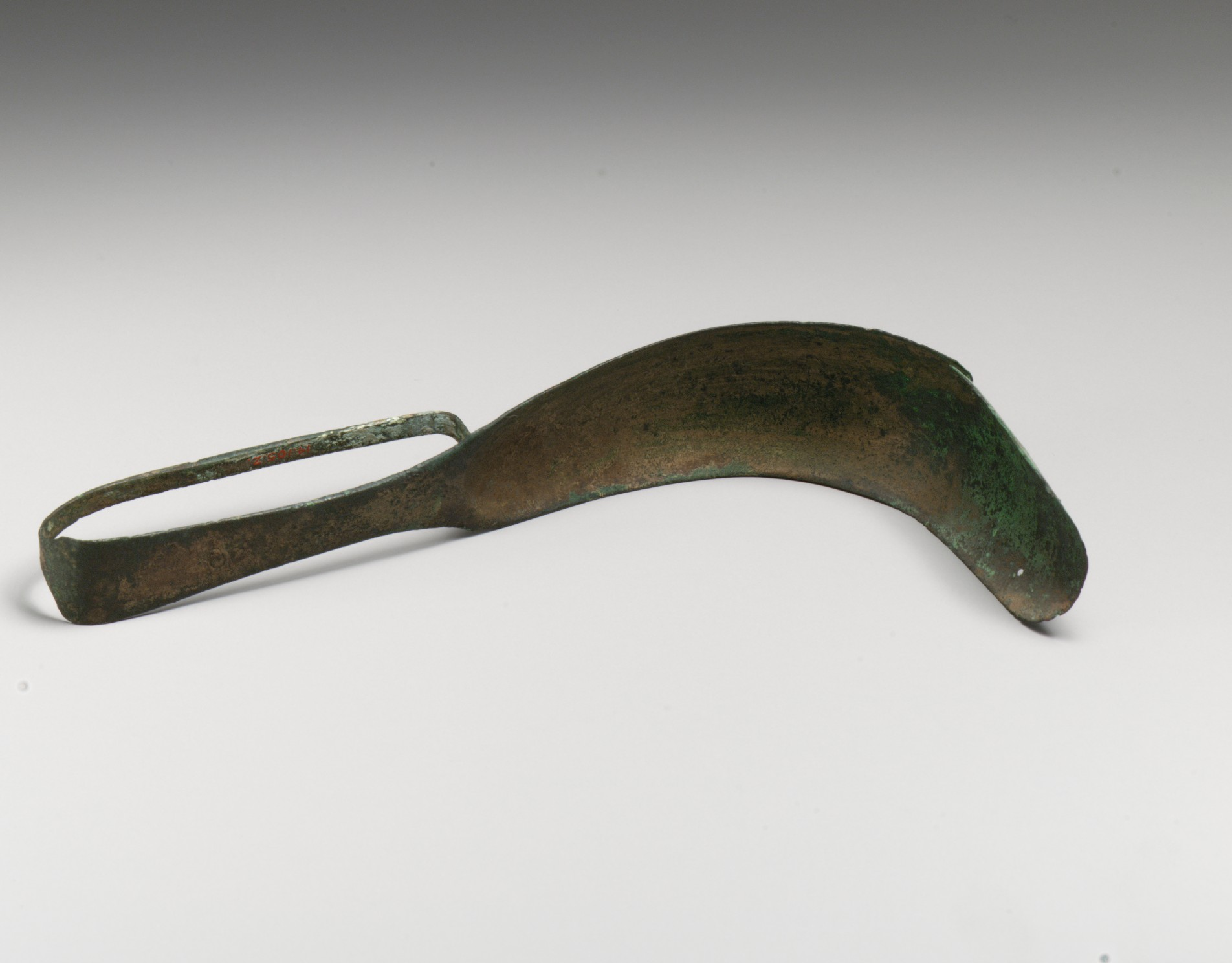
A bronze strigil used to scrape oil and sweat off the body of a bather

One major component of a visit to the baths was working out and building athleticism. In Roman baths, there was often a palaestra, an outdoor courtyard surrounded by columns, which bathers would use like a modern day gym. Some activities that would occur in the palaestra included boxing, discus throwing, weight lifting, and wrestling–activities which are all depicted in mosaics from baths in Ostia. Initially a common Greek practice, this athletic competition in daily life became widespread in the Roman world. Another important aspect of a visit to the baths was the ritual of cleaning the body. This was done using oil rubbed into the skin of a bather which would then be scraped off with a strigil, a metal scraper with a dull blade and a handle. They believed that the oil would absorb the dirt on a person's body and encourage sweating that would lead to unclogged pores and better general health. Likewise, any sweating from exercise that occurred after the oil had been rubbed on would form a watery layer underneath the oil and the dirt attached to it, lifting it off the skin, resulting in more grime being removed when the oily layer was scraped off.

As a social arena, the baths were often used to convene with those of a higher social status. Because both wealthy and poor Romans went to the baths, there was great opportunity for a client to talk to a patron or try to get an invitation to dinner.

== Social concerns about bathing practices ==
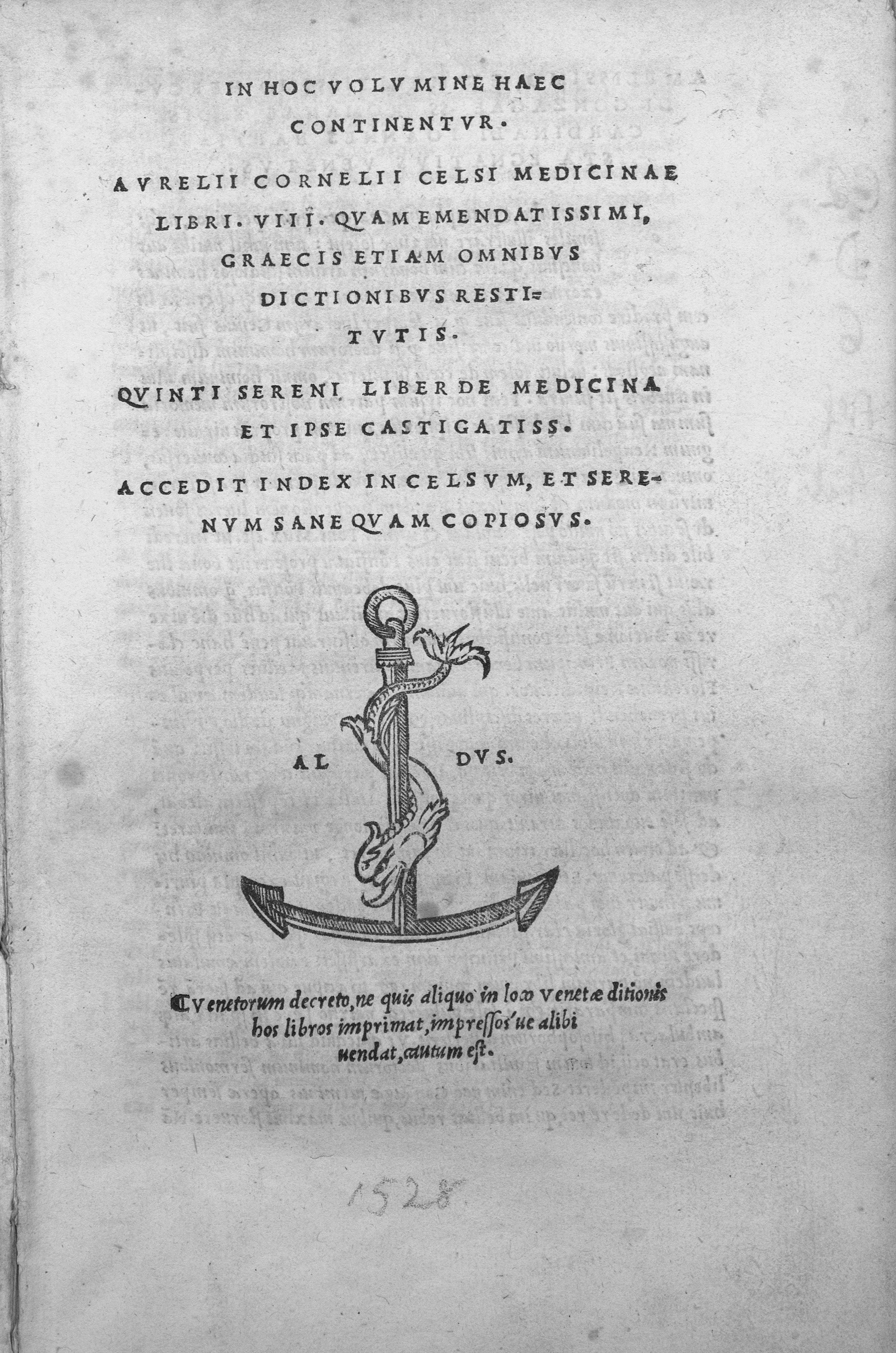
De Medicina, a medical treatise by Aulus Cornelius Celsus

While the baths were enjoyed by almost every Roman, some criticized them. The water was not renewed often and the remains of oil, dirt or even excrement were kept warm, providing a milieu for bacteria.

The emperor Marcus Aurelius complained about the dirtiness:

"Such as bathing appears to thee, oil, sweat, dirt, filthy water, all things disgusting, so is every part of life and everything."

Celsus, while commending its therapeutic virtues, warns not to go with a fresh wound because of the risk of gangrene. In fact, several tombstones from across the empire claim:

''balnea vina Venus
corrupt corpora
nostra se[t] Vitam faciunt
balnea vina Venus

— epitaph of Tiberius Claudius Secundus (1st century) CIL VI.15258, Rome.

"Baths, wine, and sex
can corrupt our bodies,
but baths, wine, and sex
make life worth living"

The philosopher Seneca instead objected to noise that interrupted his work when he resided above a bath.

== See also ==
- Chassenon Baths
- Legacy of the Roman Empire
- Victorian Turkish baths
