= Chassenon =

- Commune
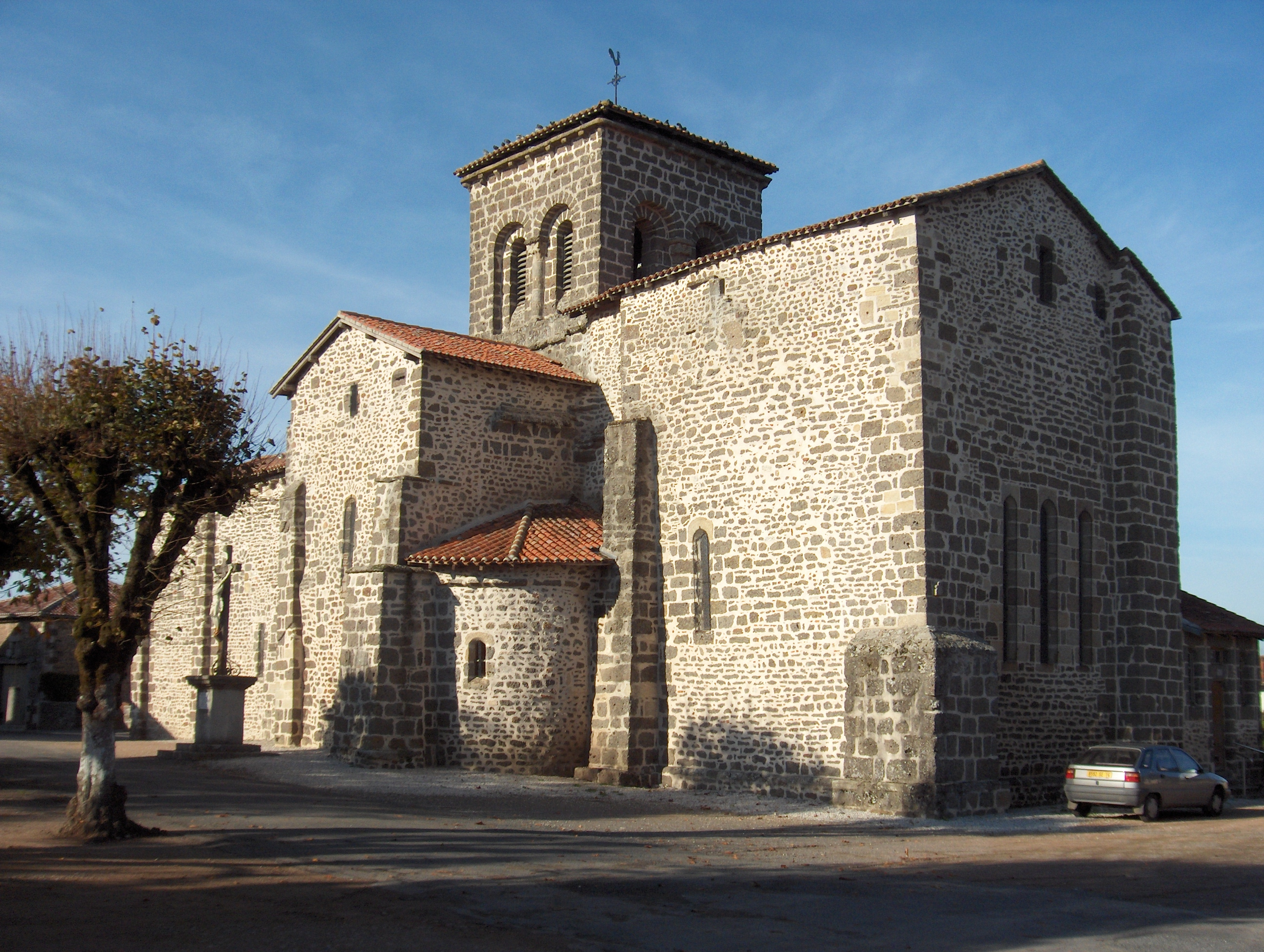
- The church in Chassenon

- Coat of arms
- Location of Chassenon
- Location within France Location within Nouvelle-Aquitaine
- Coordinates: 45°51′11″N 0°45′56″E
- Country: France
- Region: Nouvelle-Aquitaine
- Department: Charente
- Arrondissement: Confolens
- Canton: Charente-Vienne

Government
  - Mayor (2020–2026): Jean-Marie Lebarbier
- Area^{1}: 23.48 km^{2} (9.07 sq mi)
- Elevation: 220 m (720 ft)
- Highest elevation: 262 m (860 ft)
- Lowest elevation: 150 m (490 ft)
- Population (2023): 836
  - Density: 35.6/km^{2} (92.2/sq mi)
- Time zone: UTC+01:00 (CET)
  - Summer (DST): UTC+02:00 (CEST)
- INSEE/Postal code: 16086 /16150
- ^{1} French Land Register data, which excludes lakes, ponds, glaciers > 1 km^{2} (0.386 sq mi or 247 acres) and river estuaries.

Chassenon (French pronunciation: [ʃasnɔ̃]; Occitan: Chassanom) is a commune in the Charente department in southwestern France.

== History ==
The ancient name of the village was Cassinomagus.

Situated on the Agrippan Way (Lyon - Saintes), Cassinomagus was, in the Roman times, important enough to be mentioned on the mediaeval Peutinger map as one of the two secondary towns between Limoges and Saintes. The remains of this Gallo-Roman town lay on about 300 hectares and include a sanctuary of about 25 hectares. This sanctuary consisted of several monuments: a big temple, two small ones, a theatre (amphitheatre ?), and thermal baths. The Chassenon baths, which are very well preserved, can be visited.

The impactite, which is part of the Rochechouart impact structure, was quarried north-west of Rochechouart near Chassenon, was the stone principally used in the building of the monumental Roman baths of Cassinomagus.

== Population ==
Historical population
Year	Pop.	±% p.a.
1968	1,072	—
1975	982	−1.24%
1982	1,023	+0.59%
1990	964	−0.74%
1999	903	−0.72%
2007	902	−0.01%
2012	863	−0.88%
2017	880	+0.39%
2023	836	−0.85%
Source: INSEE

== See also ==
- Communes of the Charente department
- Rochechouart crater
