= Chassenon Baths =

Gallo-Roman bath complex in Chassenon, Charente, France

- Thermes de Chassenon (French)
- Longeas Baths, Cassinomagus
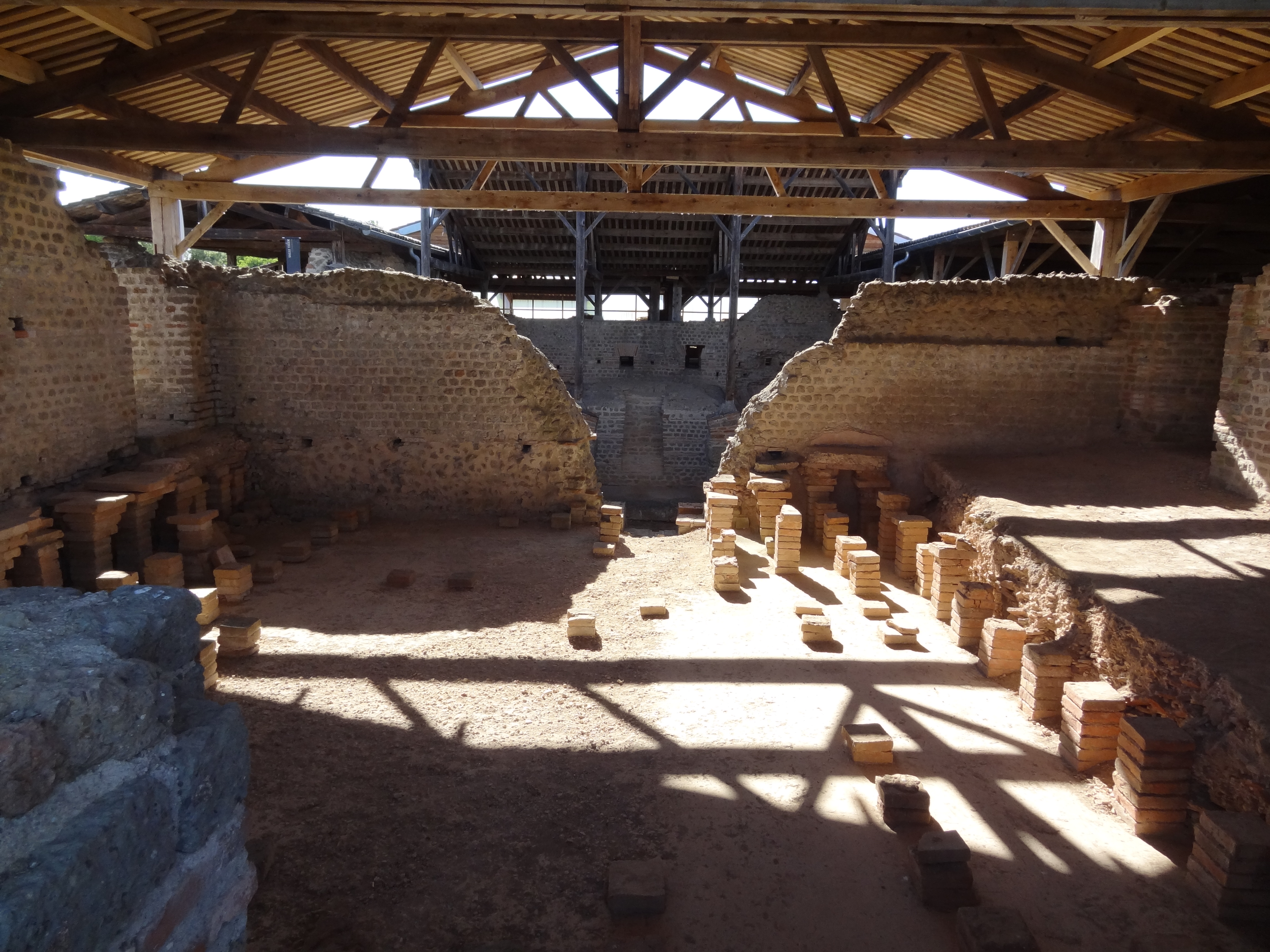
- View of the southern unctorium

- Location of Chassenon Baths in Nouvelle-Aquitaine and France Chassenon Baths (France)
- Interactive map of Chassenon Baths
- 45.8485°N 0.7707°E
- Type: Roman baths
- Periods: High Roman Empire
- Cultures: Lemovices, Gallo-Roman
- Location: Chassenon, Charente, Nouvelle-Aquitaine, France
- Region: Aquitaine, Aquitaine seconde, Civitas Lemovices
- Part of: Cassinomagus

History
- Built: c. 90 CE
- Abandoned: c. 6th century CE

Site notes
- Elevation: 215 m (705 ft)
- Area: 25 hectares (62 acres)
- Owner: Charente Department
- Public access: March to November; year-round for groups by reservation
- Website: www.cassinomagus.fr

Designations
- Designation: Monument historique

The Chassenon Baths, formerly known as the "Longeas Baths," in Chassenon (within the Charente department) along the Via Agrippa, are among the best‑preserved bath complexes of the Gallo‑Roman world. They form part of the ancient city of Cassinomagus, integrated into a monumental complex that includes a vast sanctuary with the baths, a theater, and a temple. These are double Roman baths, serving both hygienic and therapeutic purposes, constructed over two levels and covering about 1.5 hectares (3.7 acres).

== History ==
The Chassenon region was inhabited by the Lemovices, a Celtic people of Celtic Gaul. They were established in Roman Aquitaine, one of the three Roman provinces (alongside Belgica and Lyonnaise) created by Emperor Augustus in 27 BCE. Their capital was Augustoritum (modern Limoges). The city of Cassinomagus lay on the western border of the Lemovices' territory, near the Pictones (capital Poitiers), the Santones (Saintes), and the Petrocorii (Périgueux).

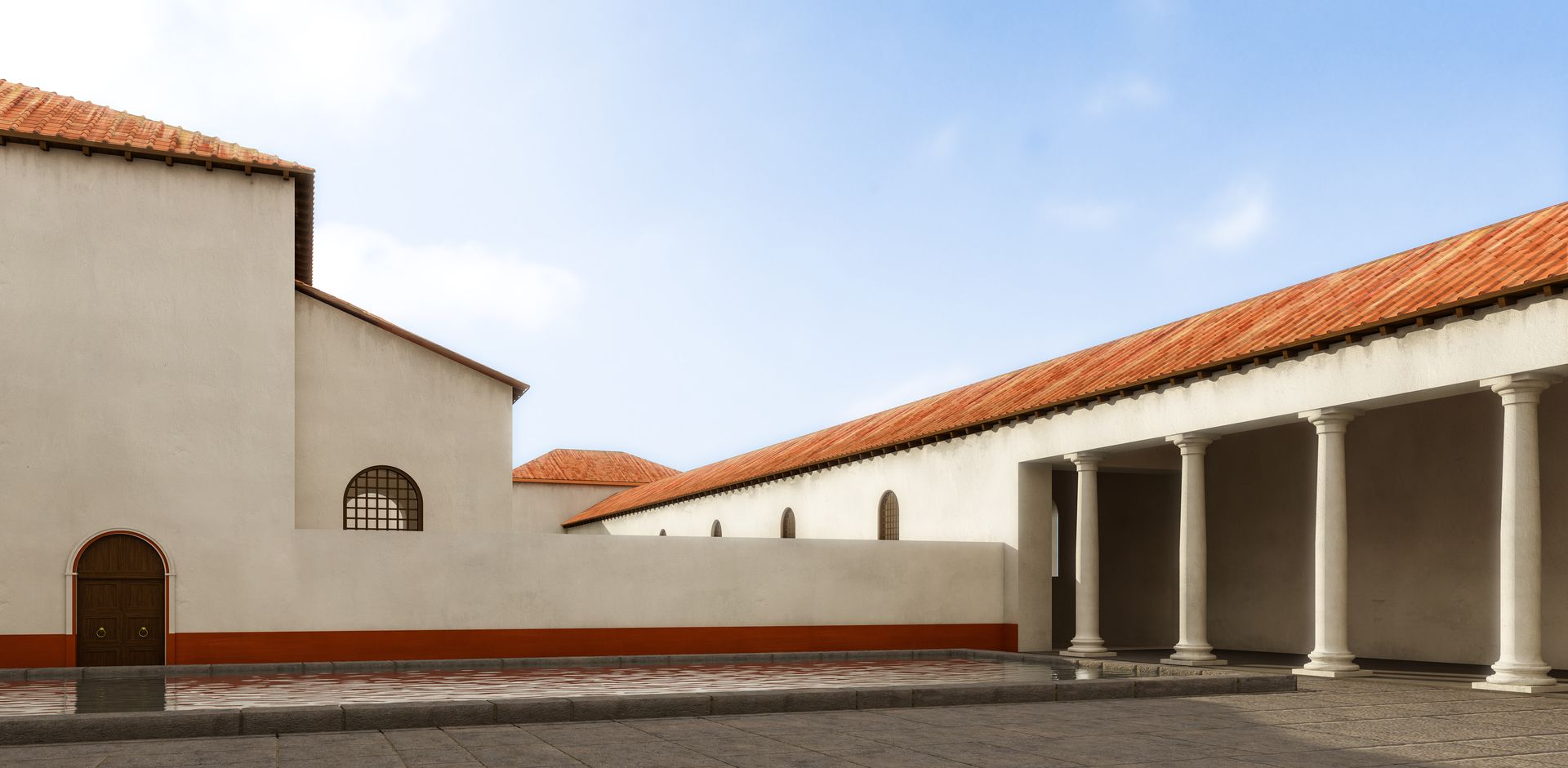
3D reconstruction of the northern palaestra of the baths

Construction of the baths spanned about 90 years, beginning around 90 CE during the High Roman Empire and concluding around 180 CE. Visitors today can observe the ruins as they likely appeared by the late 2nd or early 3rd century.

A fire, presumed accidental due to the absence of recorded conflicts, destroyed the baths in the late 3rd century. The site was rebuilt in the 4th century, retaining its primary function but with reduced grandeur. Some hypocaust systems remained unrestored, and wooden floors were replaced with less costly materials like earth and sand. By the early 5th century, the baths transitioned into rural housing, continuing in this role until the 6th century, when they were abandoned and gradually buried.

The Chassenon Baths are classified as a historic monument and are owned by the Charente department. Excavations occurred from 1958 to 1988, uncovering much of the site, and resumed in 1995. Ongoing digs have deepened understanding of the baths' role and context, revealing an octagonal temple (Montélu), a theater, an aqueduct, and a water supply network within the monumental complex.

The double baths are open to visitors from March to November, and year‑round for groups by reservation.

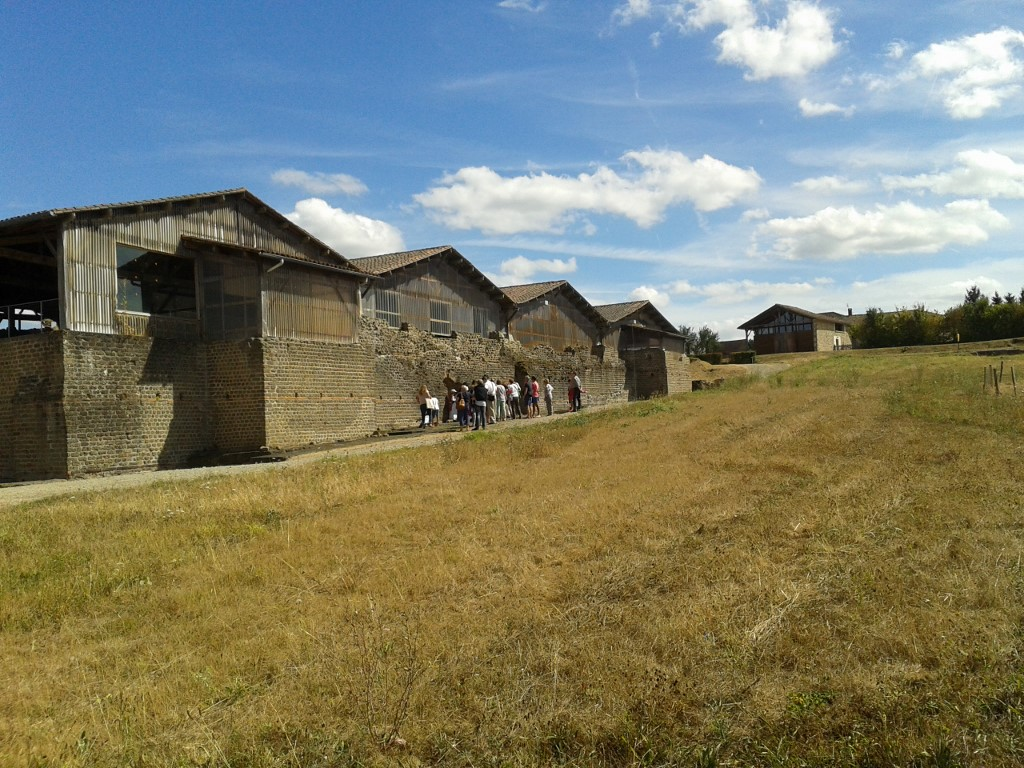
View of the baths from the northwest

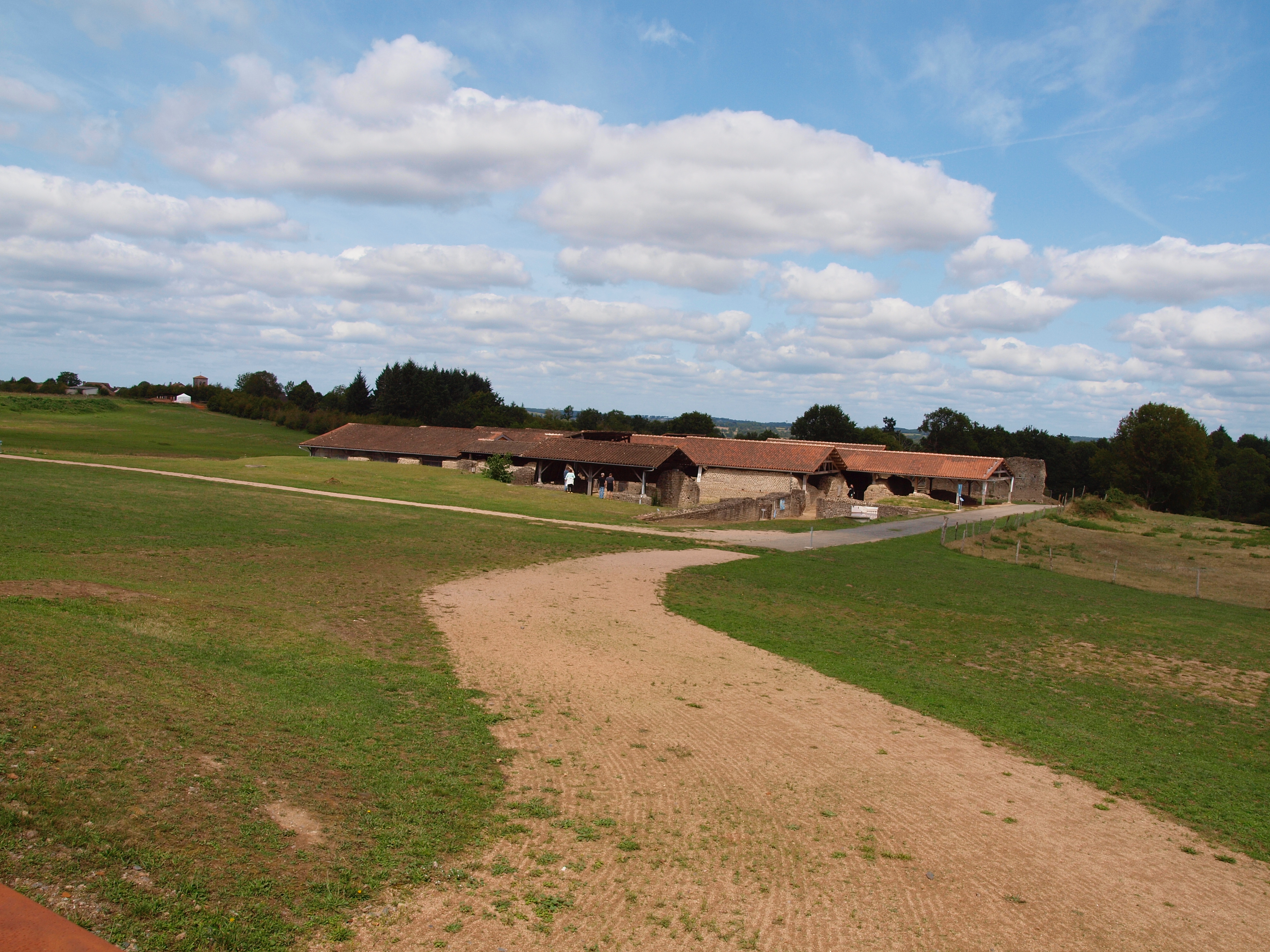
General view of the baths from the southeast

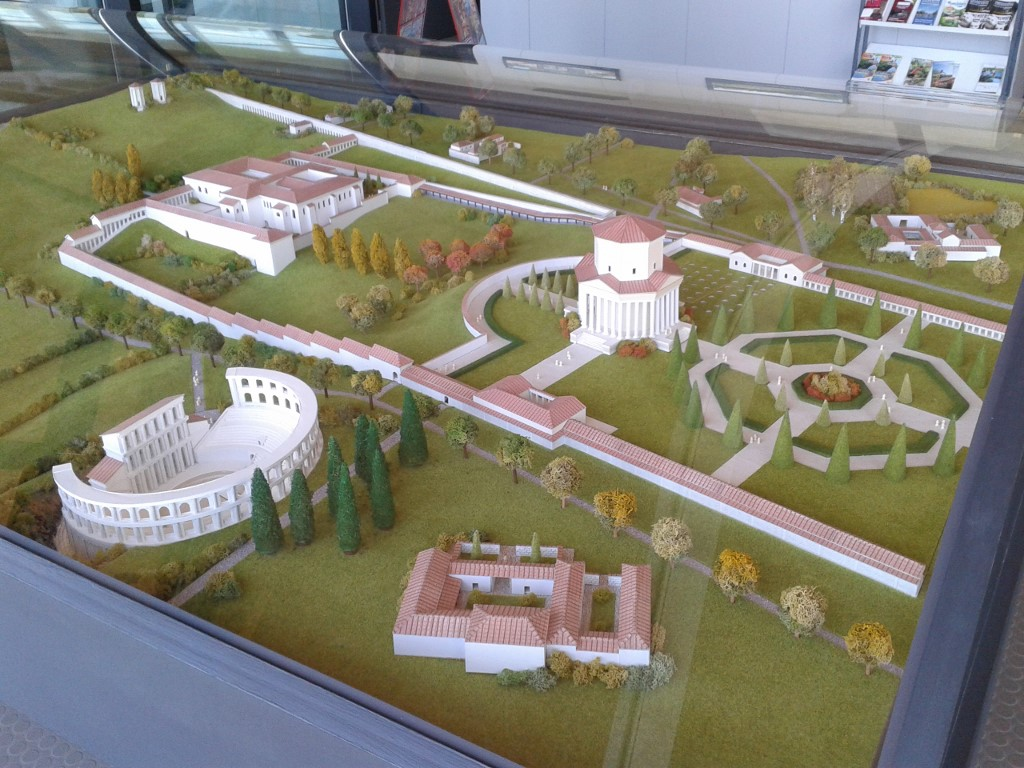
Model of the Cassinomagus monumental complex

== Structure ==
=== Overview ===
Geophysical surveys indicate the baths cover a square area of 120 metres (390 ft) per side, with about two-thirds currently excavated. Access was available directly from the Via Agrippa upon entering Cassinomagus.

=== Ground floor ===
The ground floor was a technical level for staff, housing:

- A large northeast gallery of uncertain function.
- A northern courtyard servicing latrines in the upper-left corner and the sewer network.
- A vaulted passage from the northern courtyard leading to the first heating courtyard and multiple furnaces.
- A vaulted passage from the heating courtyard accessing "ash rooms" likely used for storing furnace ash.
- A southern heating courtyard serving additional furnaces (praefurnium).

Built on a slope, the site required vaulted rooms to level the upper floor for bathers. Staff did not enter these areas during public use. Furnaces in the heating courtyards used local wood to heat bronze boilers, warming water and air for the hypocaust system. The hypocausts have radiating channels with wall-anchored tubuli.

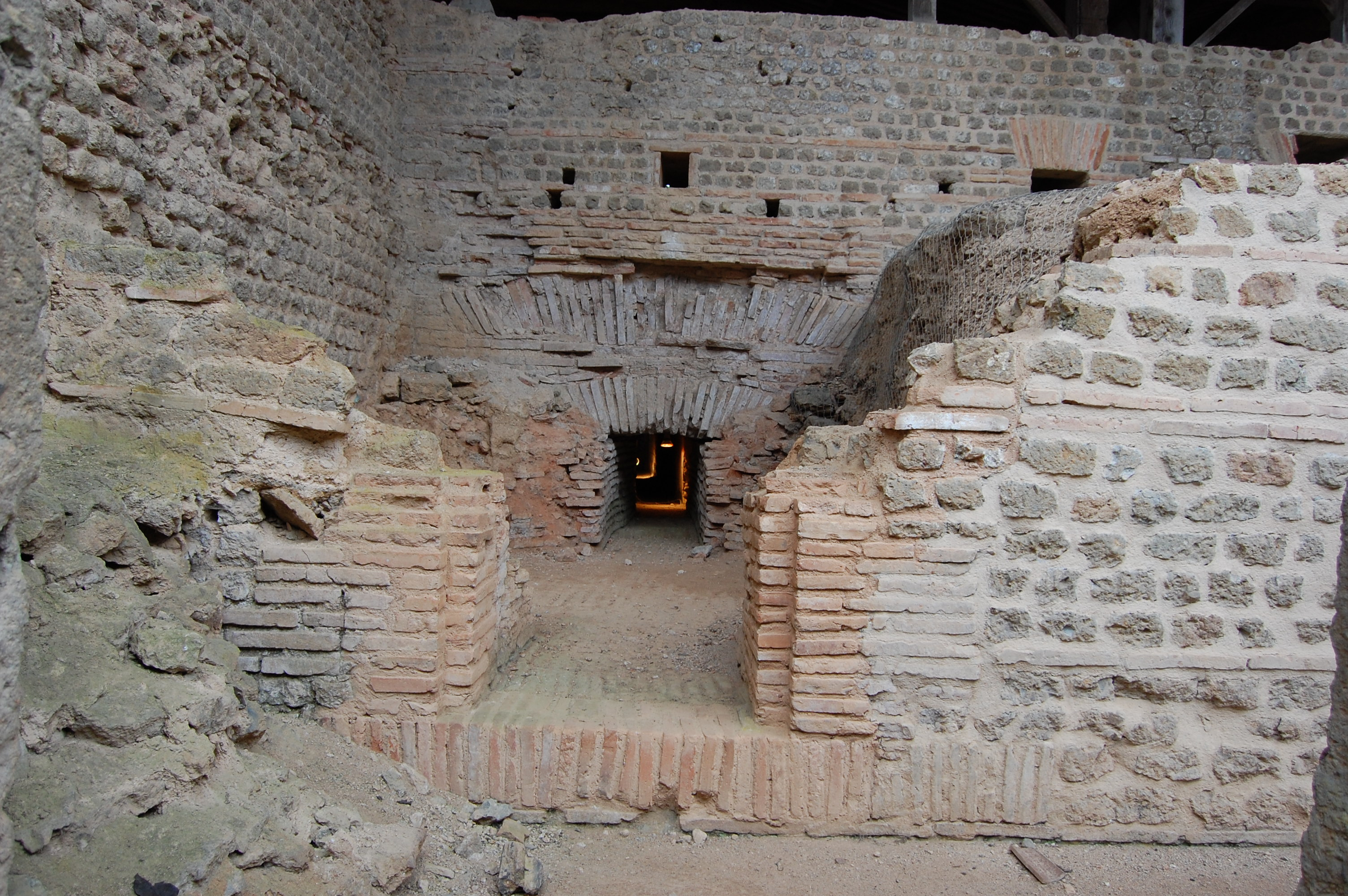
Heating furnaces

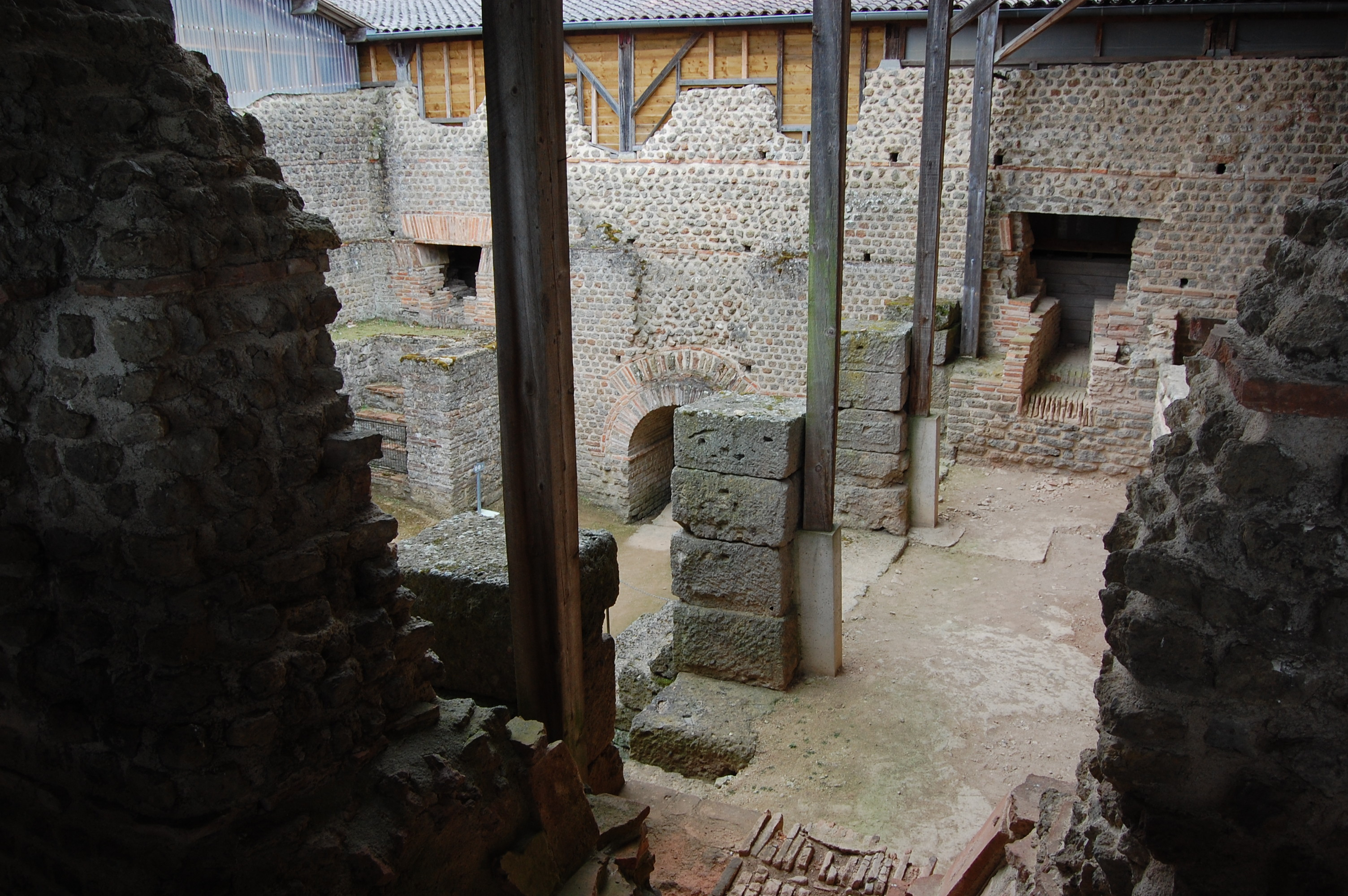
Set of furnaces in the northern heating courtyard

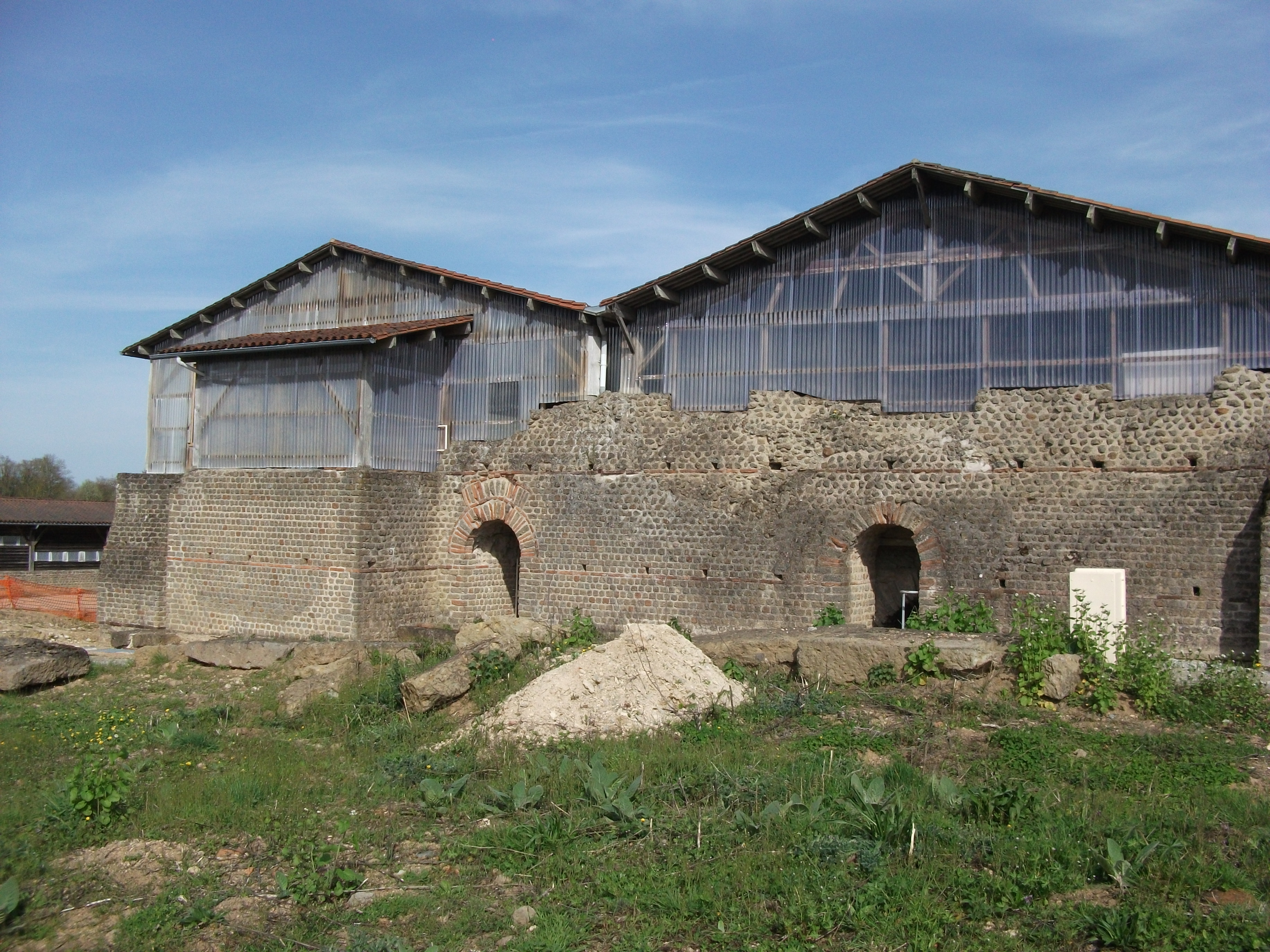
Western elevation

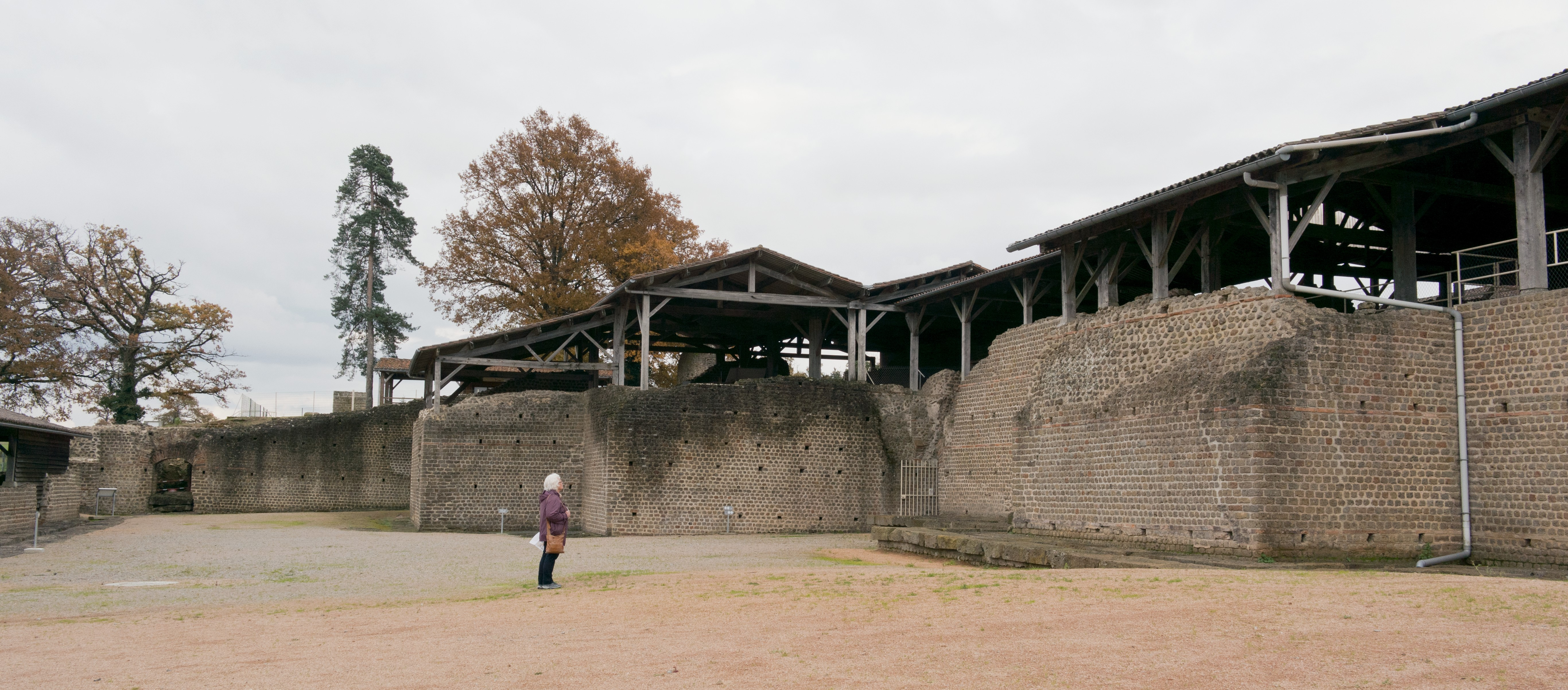
Northern service courtyard

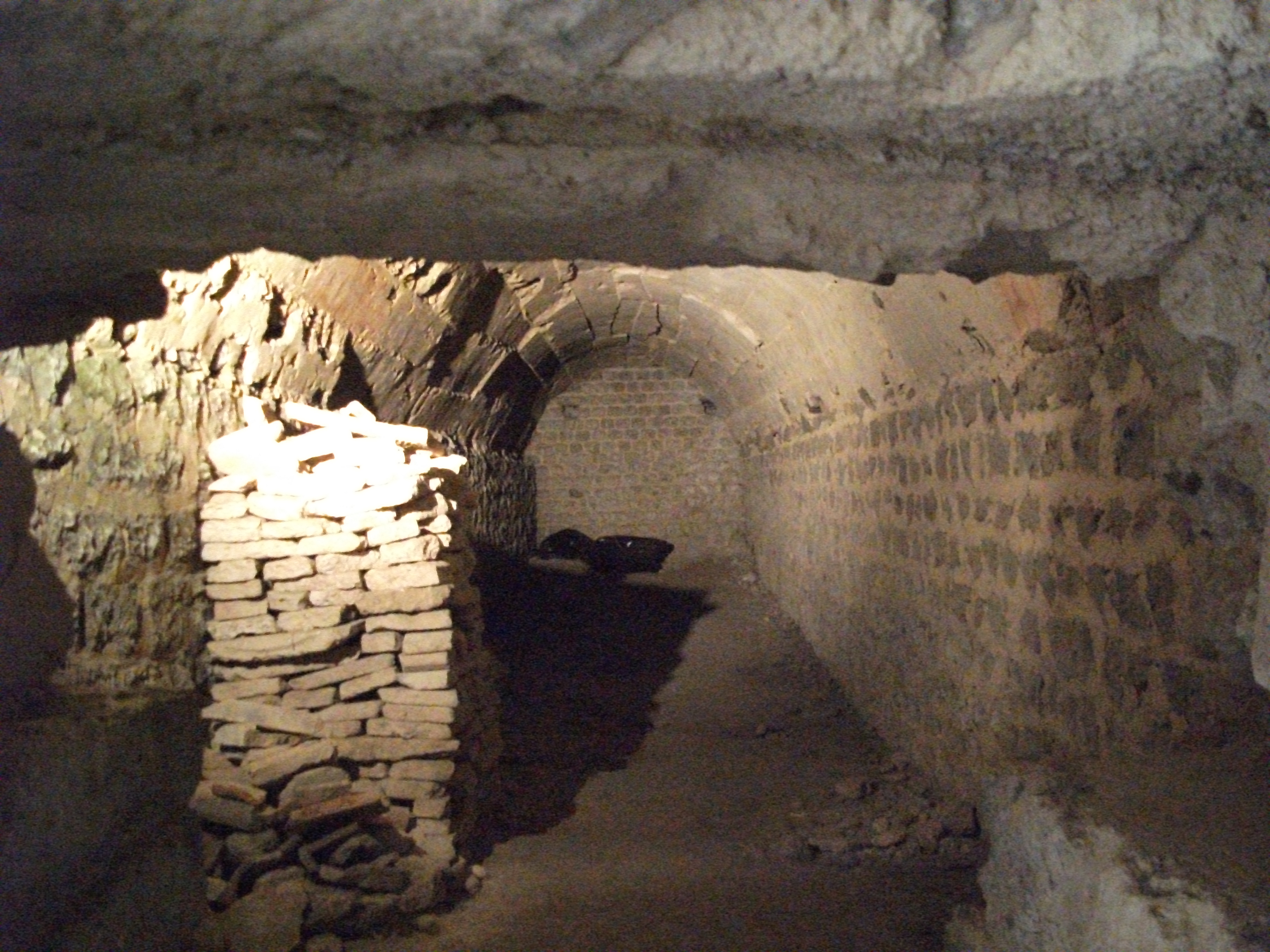
Vaulted foundation room of the baths

=== Upper floor ===
The upper floor was designed for bathers and therapeutic visitors, with the symmetrical layout of imperial double baths, with duplicated palaestrae, gymnasiums, frigidaria, and heated rooms, following a central-to-peripheral path.

==== Bathers' circuit ====
Plan of the bathers' level(after Brethenoux)

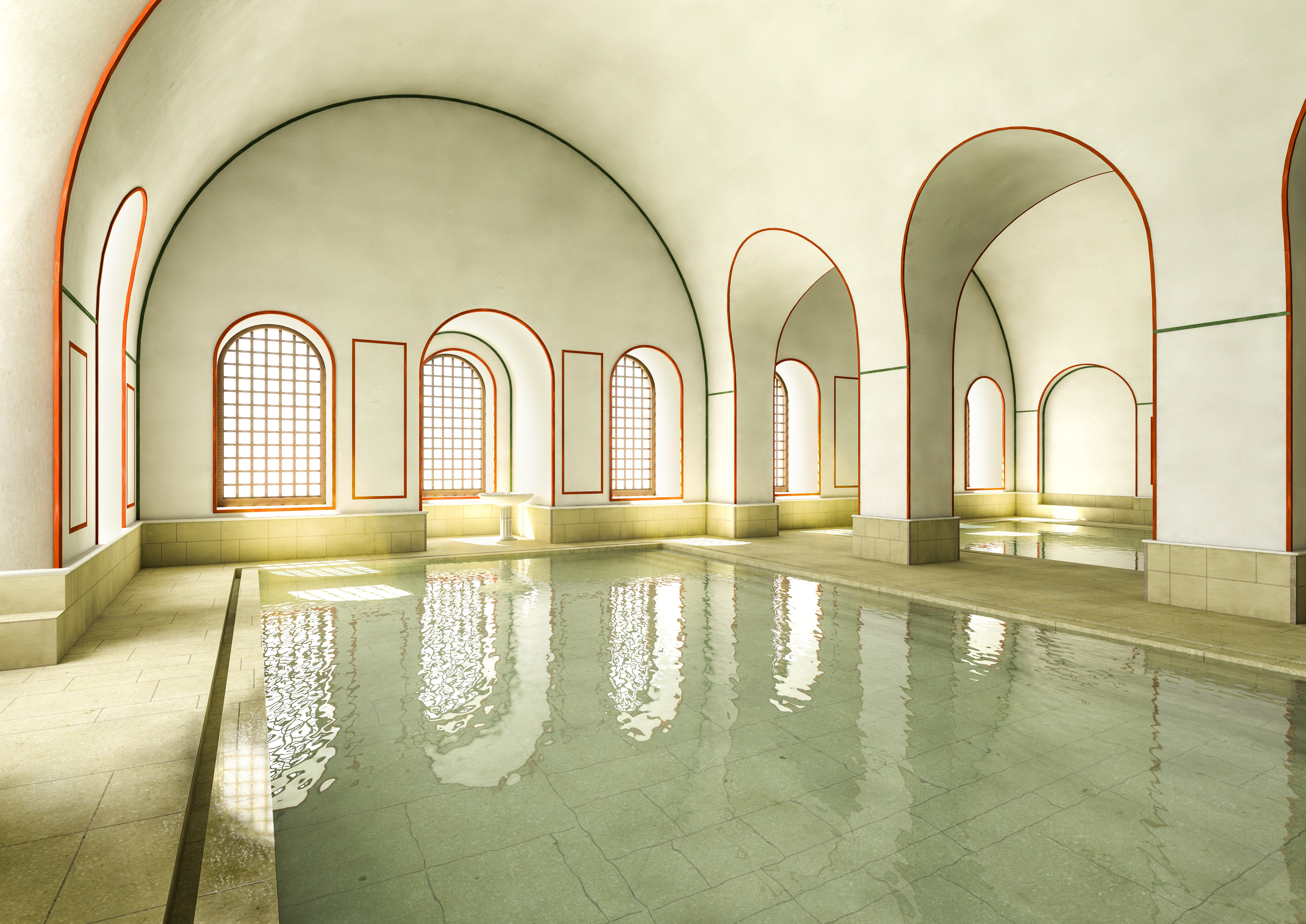
3D reconstruction of the pool room

The northern circuit catered to athletic bathers, who passed through a large oak-floored gymnasium, a small cleaning and anointing room, and then either proceeded to the central tepidarium (a warm room of 230 square metres (2,500 sq ft)) or directly to the frigidarium. Non-athletes crossed the gymnasium to a small heated room, then to the entry tepidarium, a dry sauna, a wet sauna, an exit tepidarium, and the frigidarium, where they could swim in a small or large outdoor pool.

==== Therapeutic circuit ====
The southern circuit, for therapeutic visitors, turned left through a small heated room, the entry tepidarium, deep warm pools (1.25 metres (4.1 ft) deep), and the therapeutic frigidarium, with access to an indoor pool.

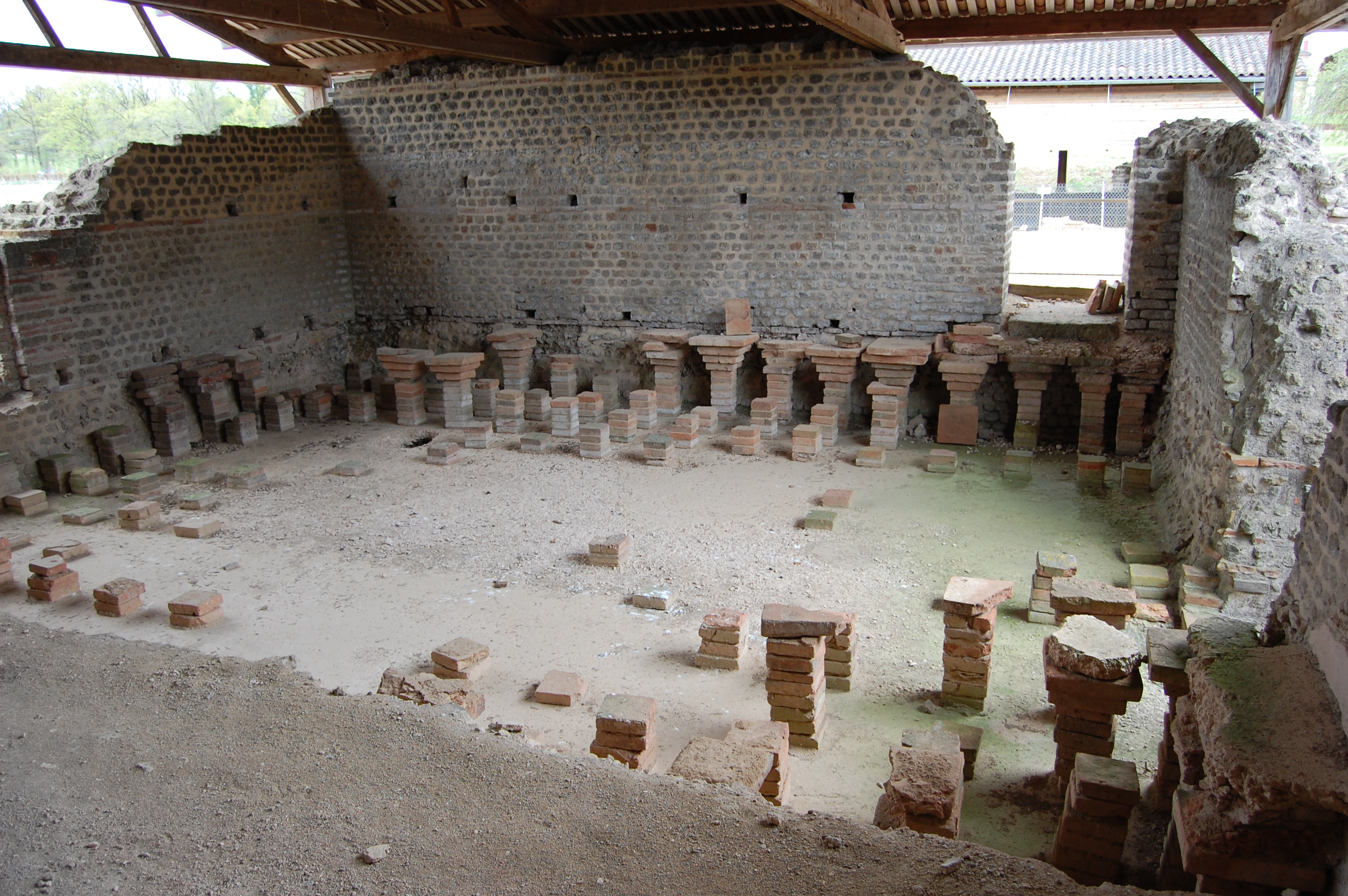
Hypocaust system

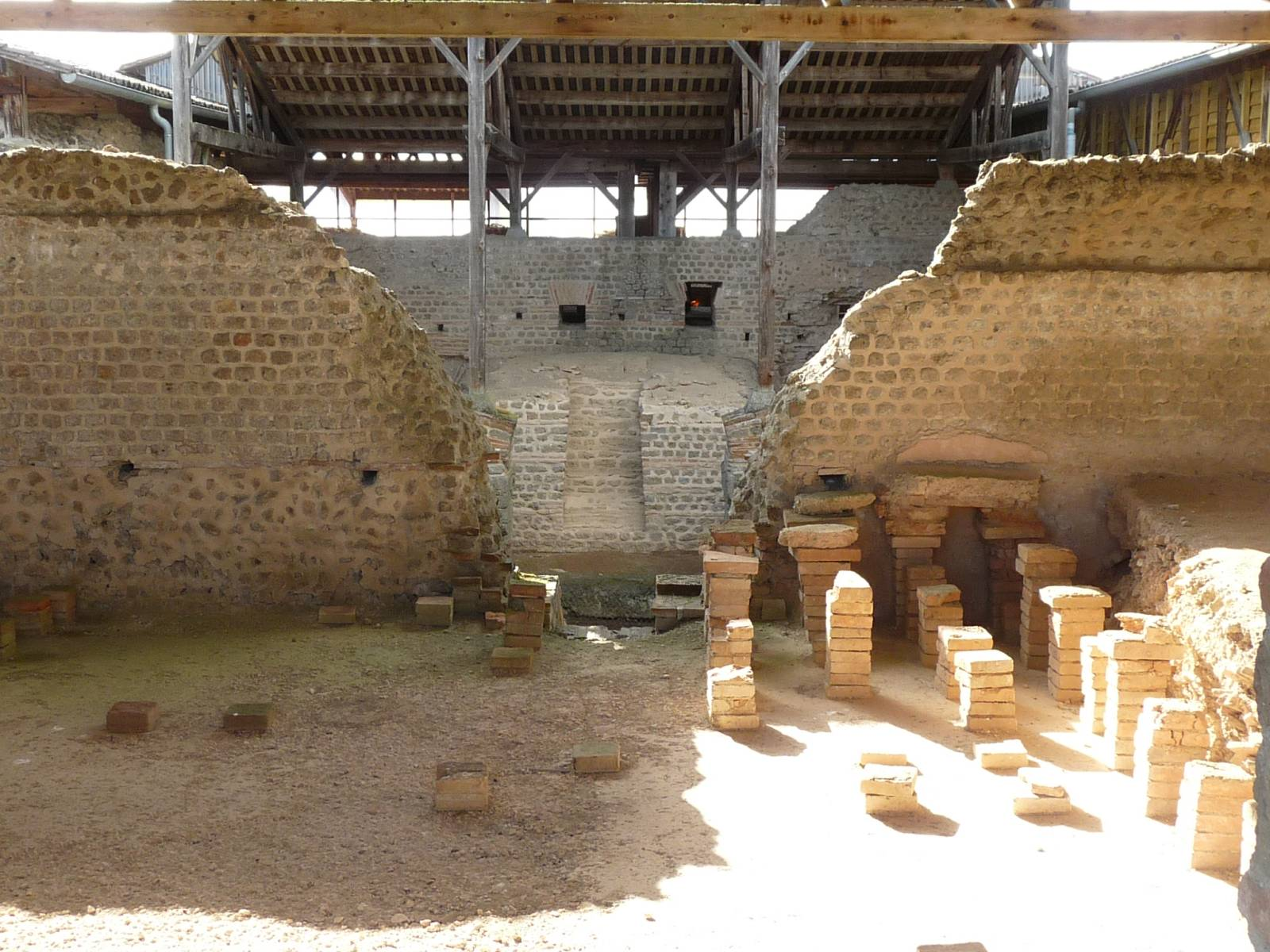
Furnaces and hypocaust pillars
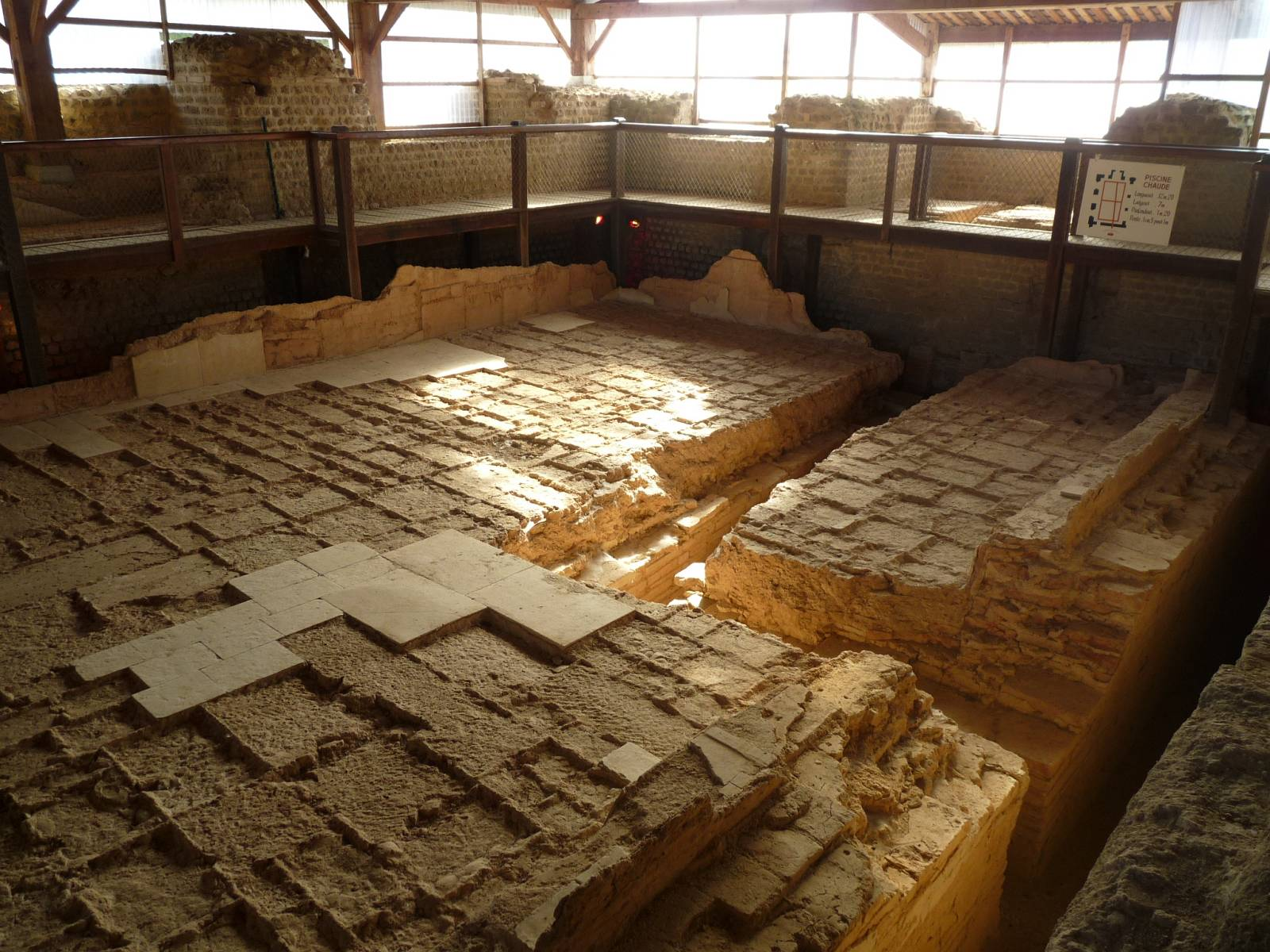
Western warm pool

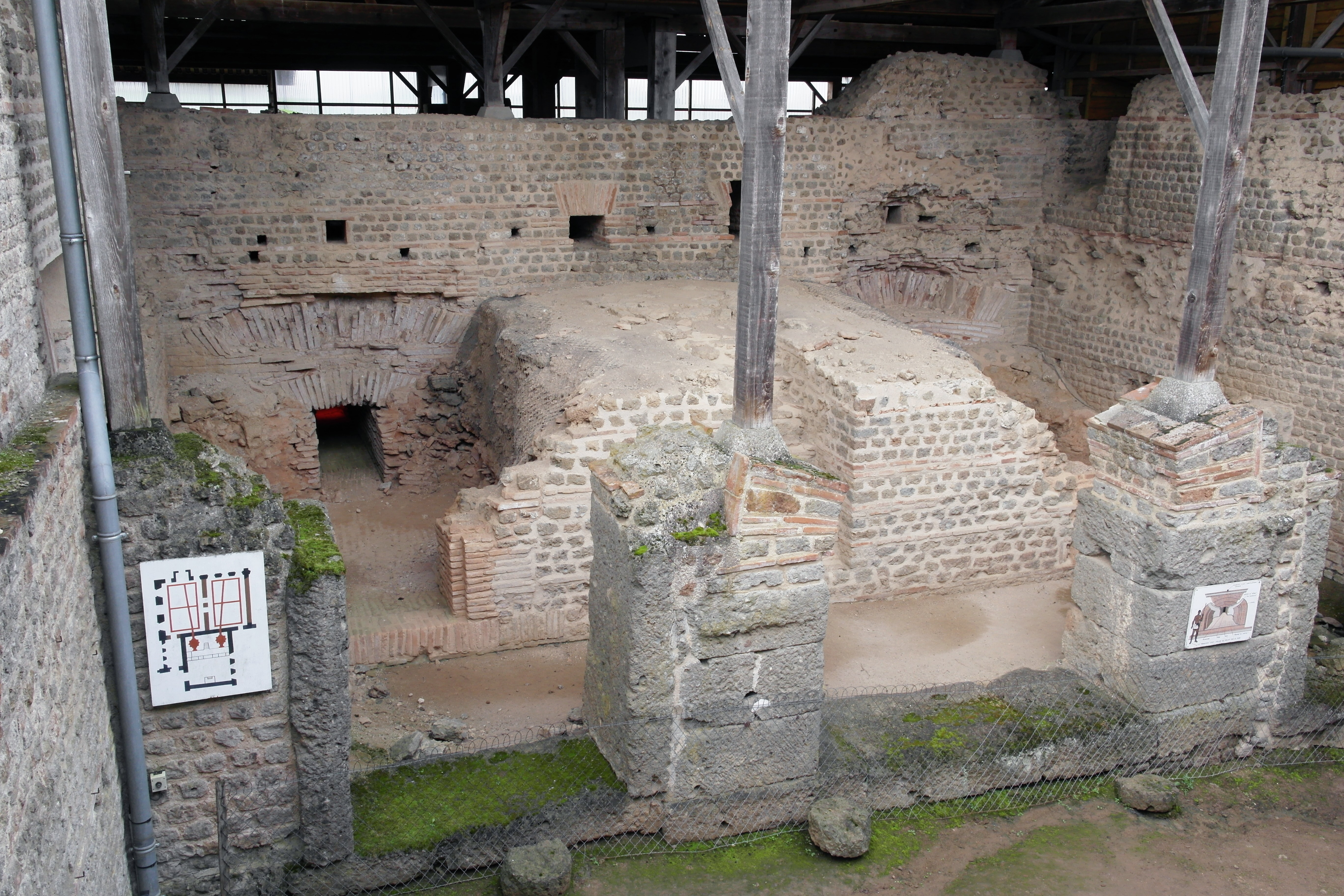
Heating furnace

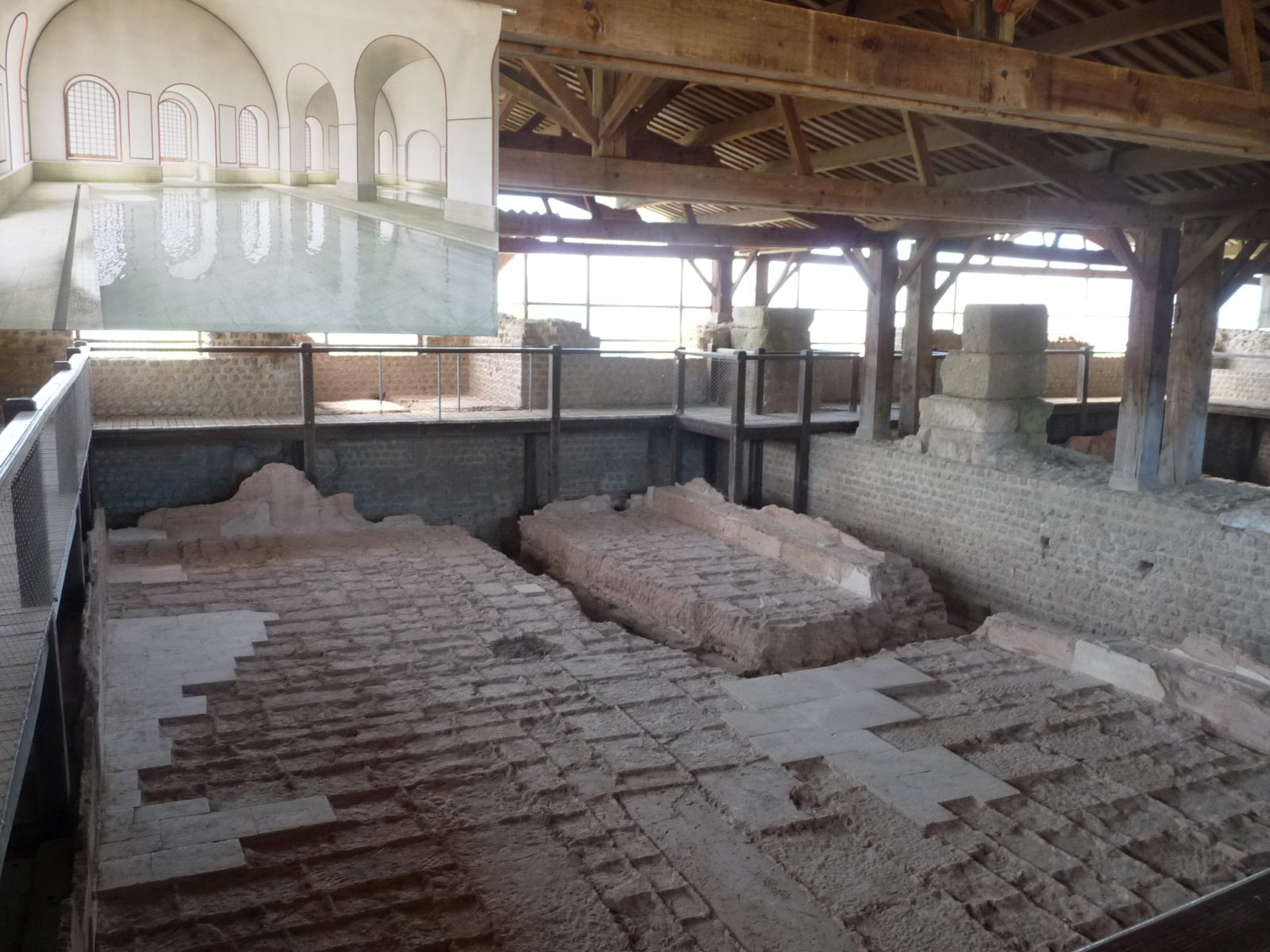
3D view of the same pool

==== Additional structures ====
The baths are flanked by two 50 metres (160 ft)-long ash-wood-floored galleries, extending eastward to the entrance forecourt. Outside, two pools and two palaestrae served as solariums, one for each circuit.

==== Materials and decoration ====
Pool floors were made of limestone or marble, with many rooms having wooden flooring. The construction used limestone and impactite stones, the latter formed by a meteorite impact creating the Rochechouart-Chassenon crater. These impactites, varied in color and texture, are resistant to temperature and frost and were quarried south of Longeas. Limestone slabs for wall and floor coverings came from Charente, while granite was sourced from Haute-Vienne.

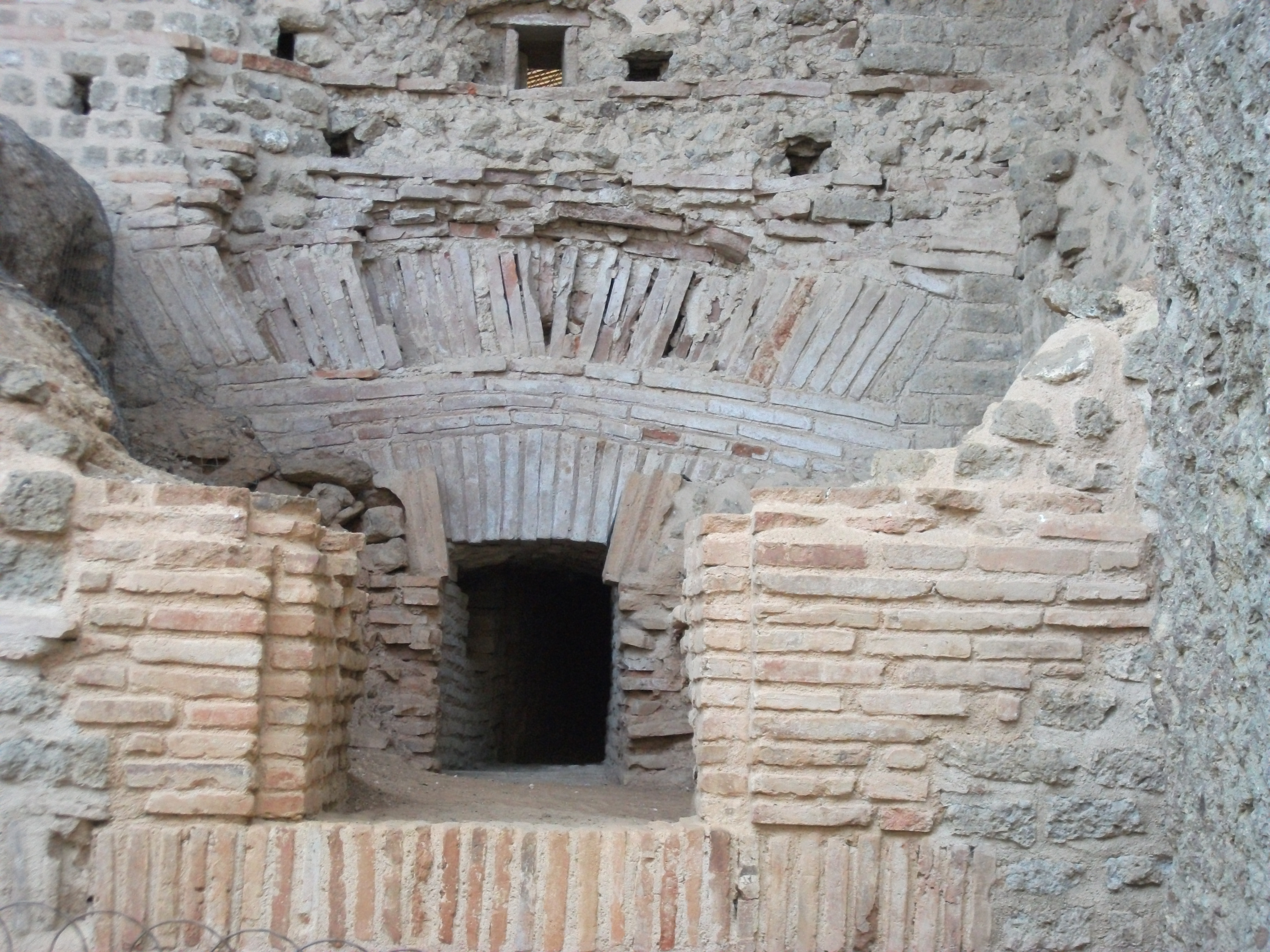
Heating conduit

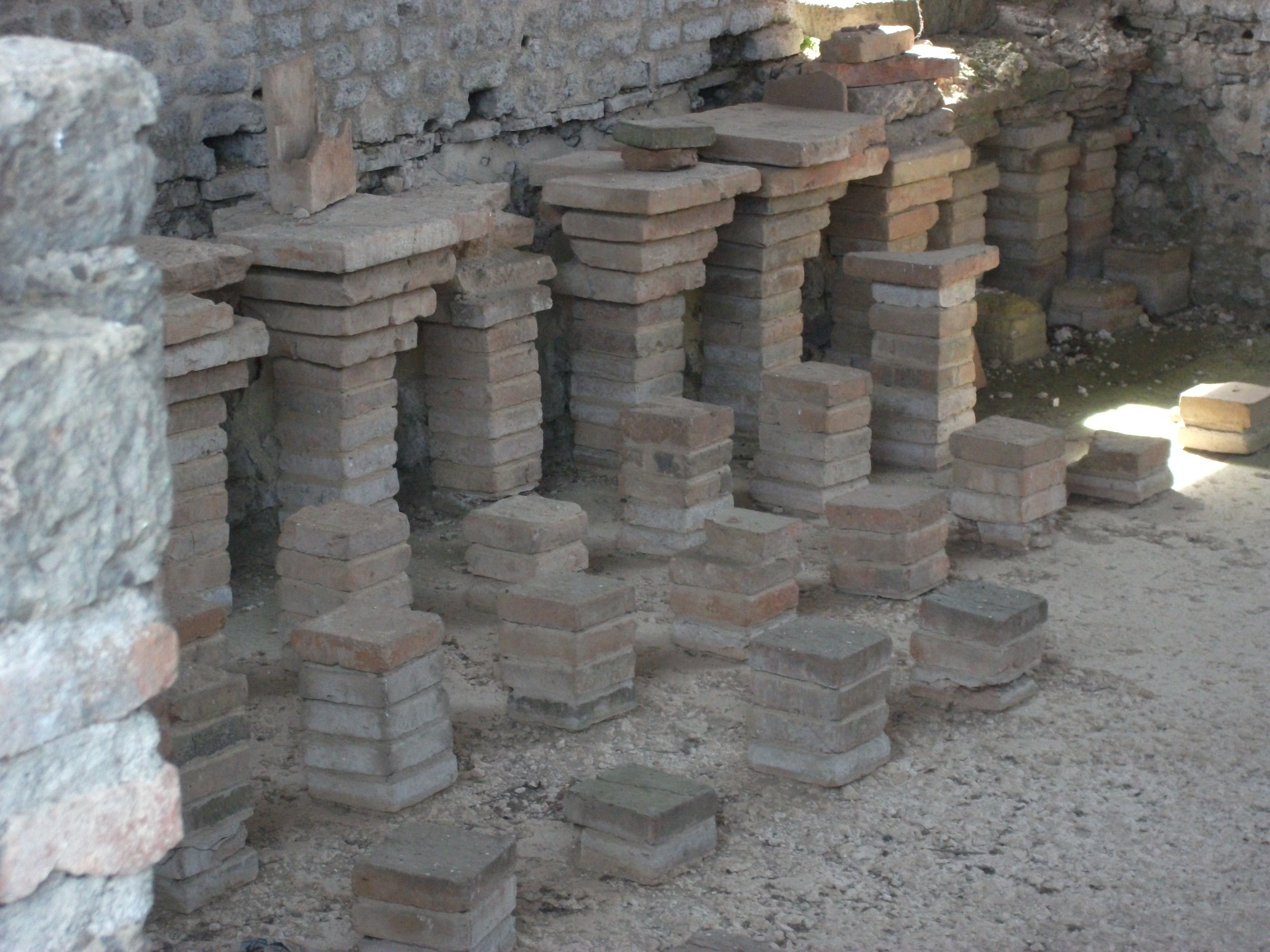
Hypocaust pillars

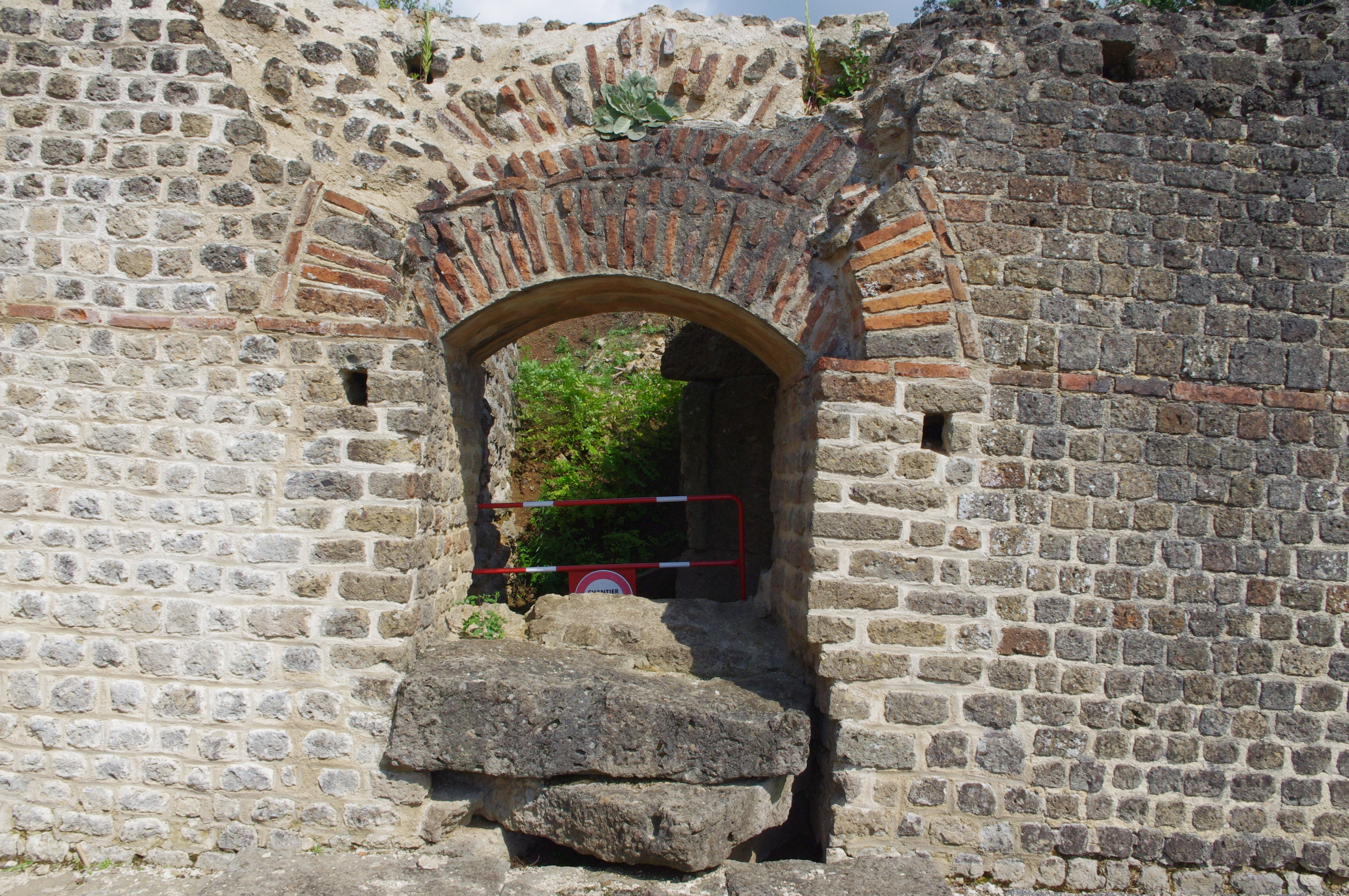
Window bay
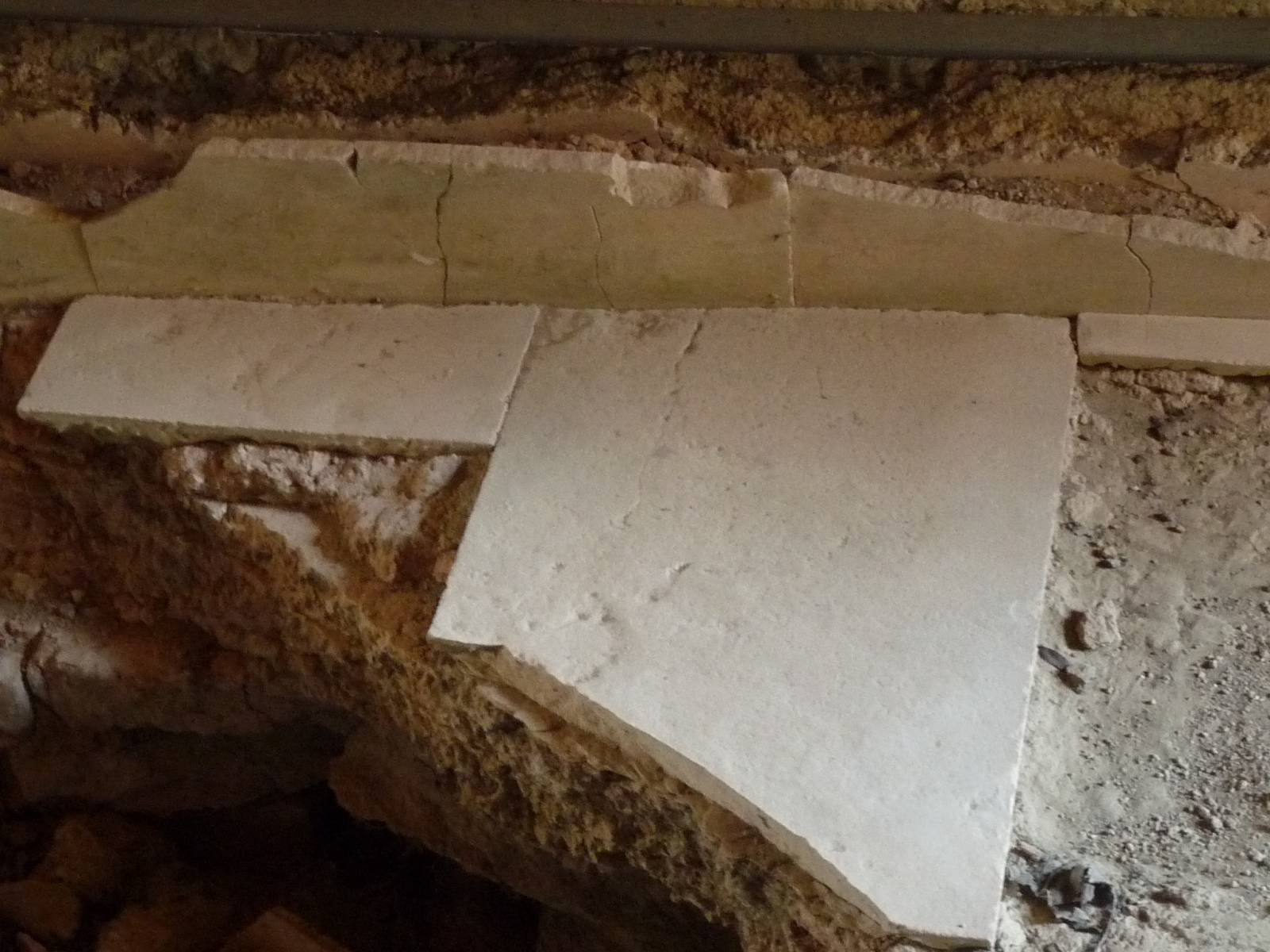
Limestone slabs of a pool

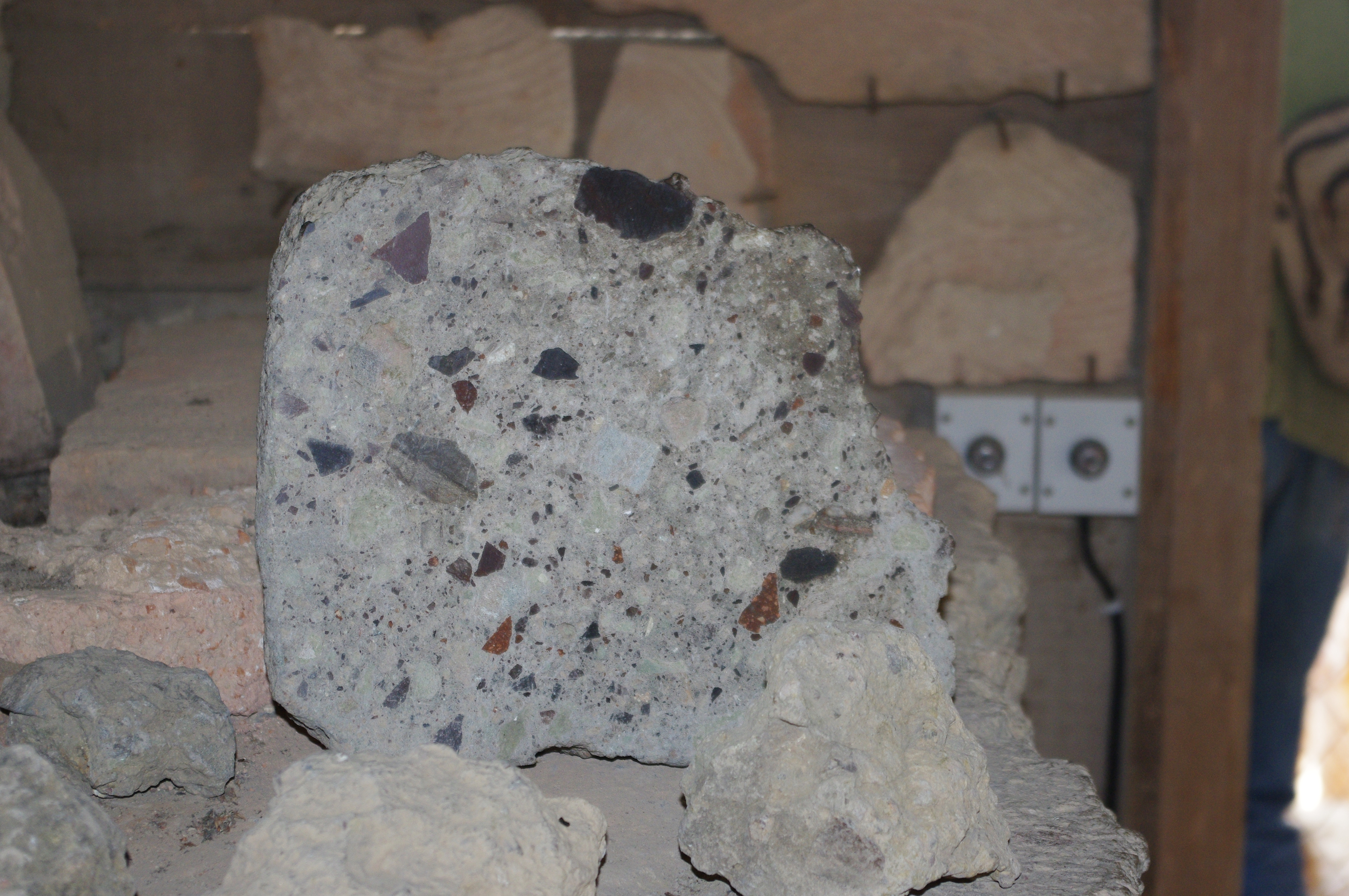
Impactite, a construction stone of the baths

== Water system ==
The baths required at least 629 cubic metres (22,200 cu ft) of water to operate. A primary aqueduct supplied the site, with a secondary aqueduct delivering water to the baths' entrance. Lead pipes fed cold basins and boilers. Wastewater was managed through three systems: a peripheral circuit for rainwater, an underground circuit for basin drainage, and a sewer for latrine cleaning, controlled by valves.

== Present day ==
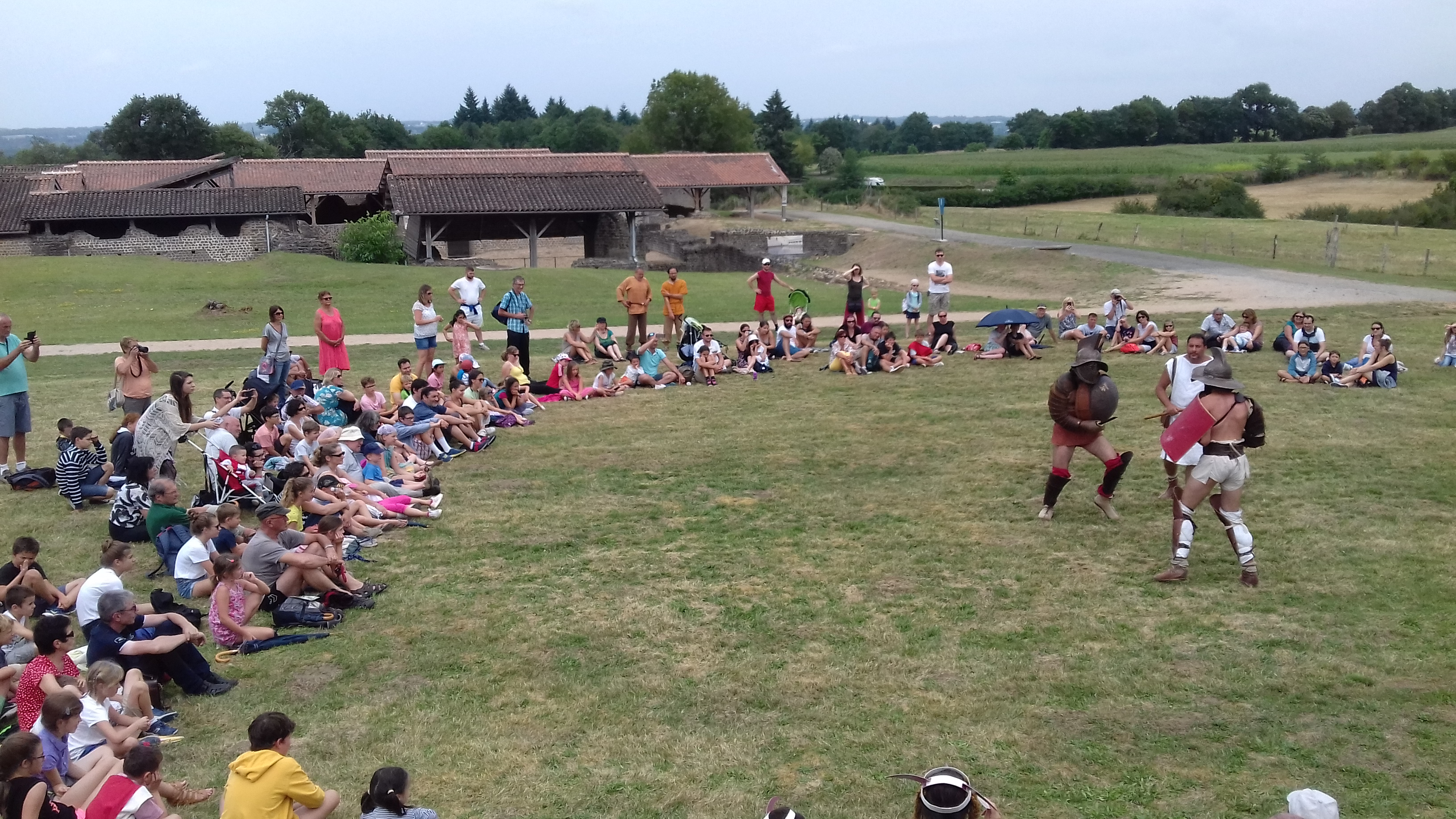
Historical reenactment event

=== Visiting ===
The Chassenon Baths and the archaeological park offer guided tours or audio guides. In 2010, visitor numbers reached 20,000 annually.

=== Tourism development ===
In the 2010s, development plans included external improvements (welcome center, ancient gardens, pathways, parking), completed by 2012–2013. A second phase proposed replacing protective roofing with a 10,000 square metres (110,000 sq ft) translucent velum dome and building a walkway from the welcome center, costing €9 million. Delayed from 2013 to 2014 due to state funding cuts, the project was canceled in April 2015 by the Charente Departmental Council due to high costs.

=== Research ===
The Charente Departmental Council acquired surrounding land for further excavations to uncover the full palaestra and aqueducts. The temple and theater areas have been surveyed but not excavated. Since 2003, the TherMoNat project has studied the baths' monumental and natural context, focusing on water management. Excavations from 1995 to 2014 were led by David Hourcade (1995–1999, 2003, 2005–2006, 2009–2010, 2012), Stéphane Lebreton (2000), Gabriel Rocque (2009–2010), and Sandra Sicard (2014).

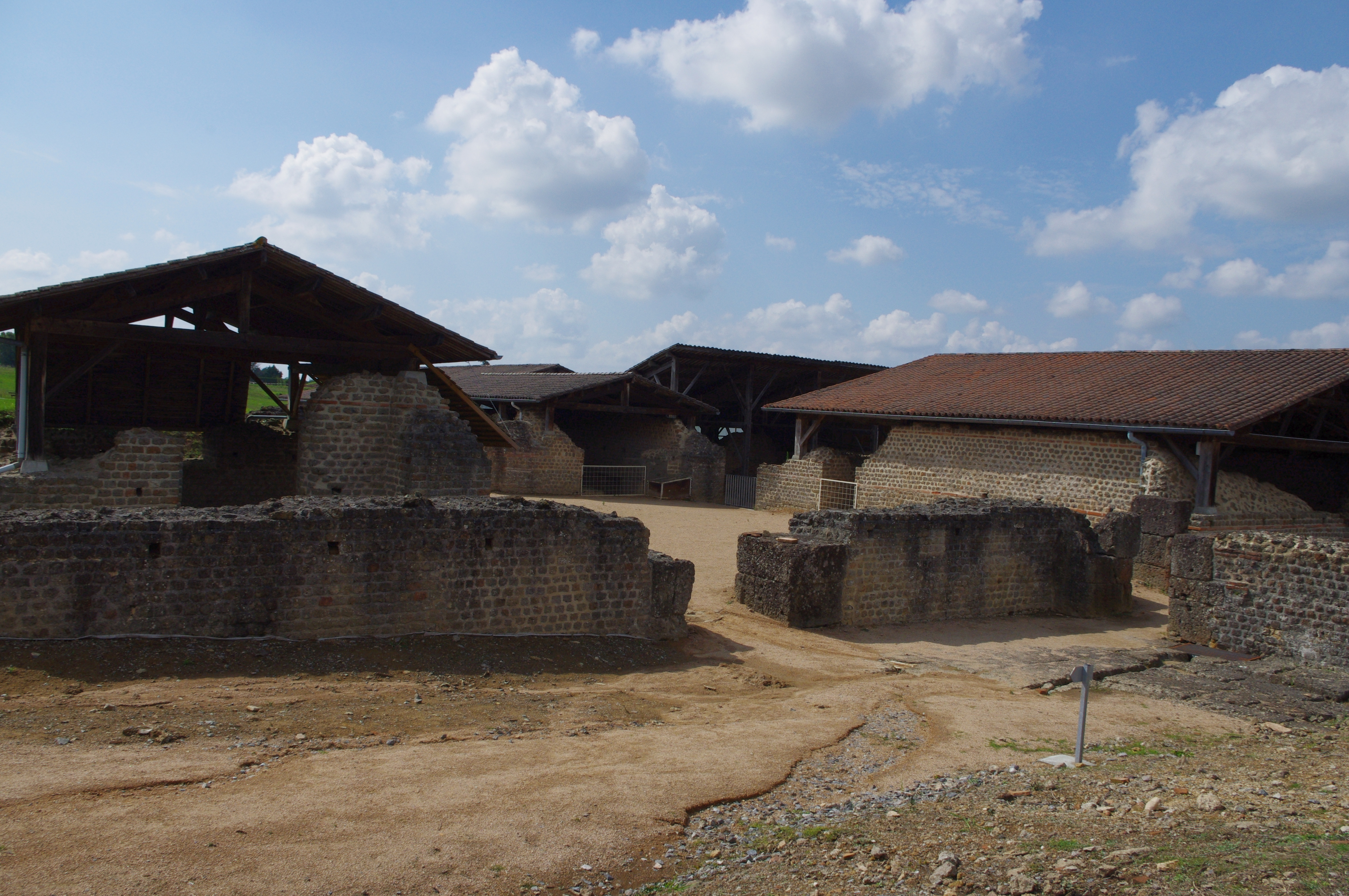
Southeast entrance of the baths

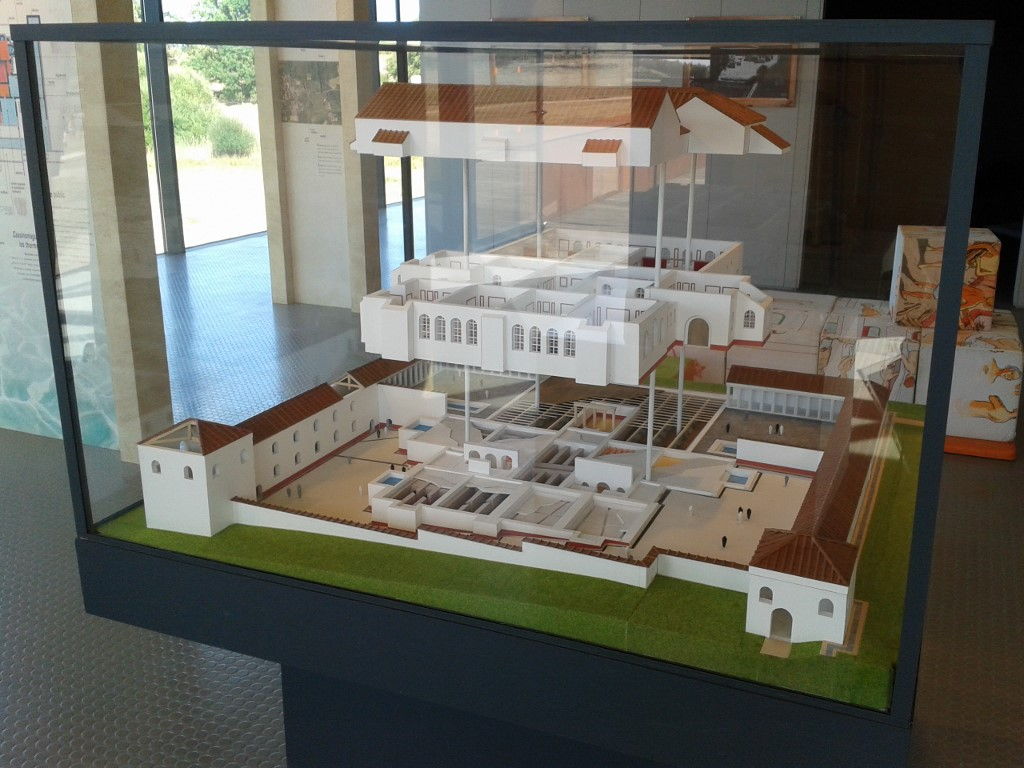
Cross-sectional model of the baths

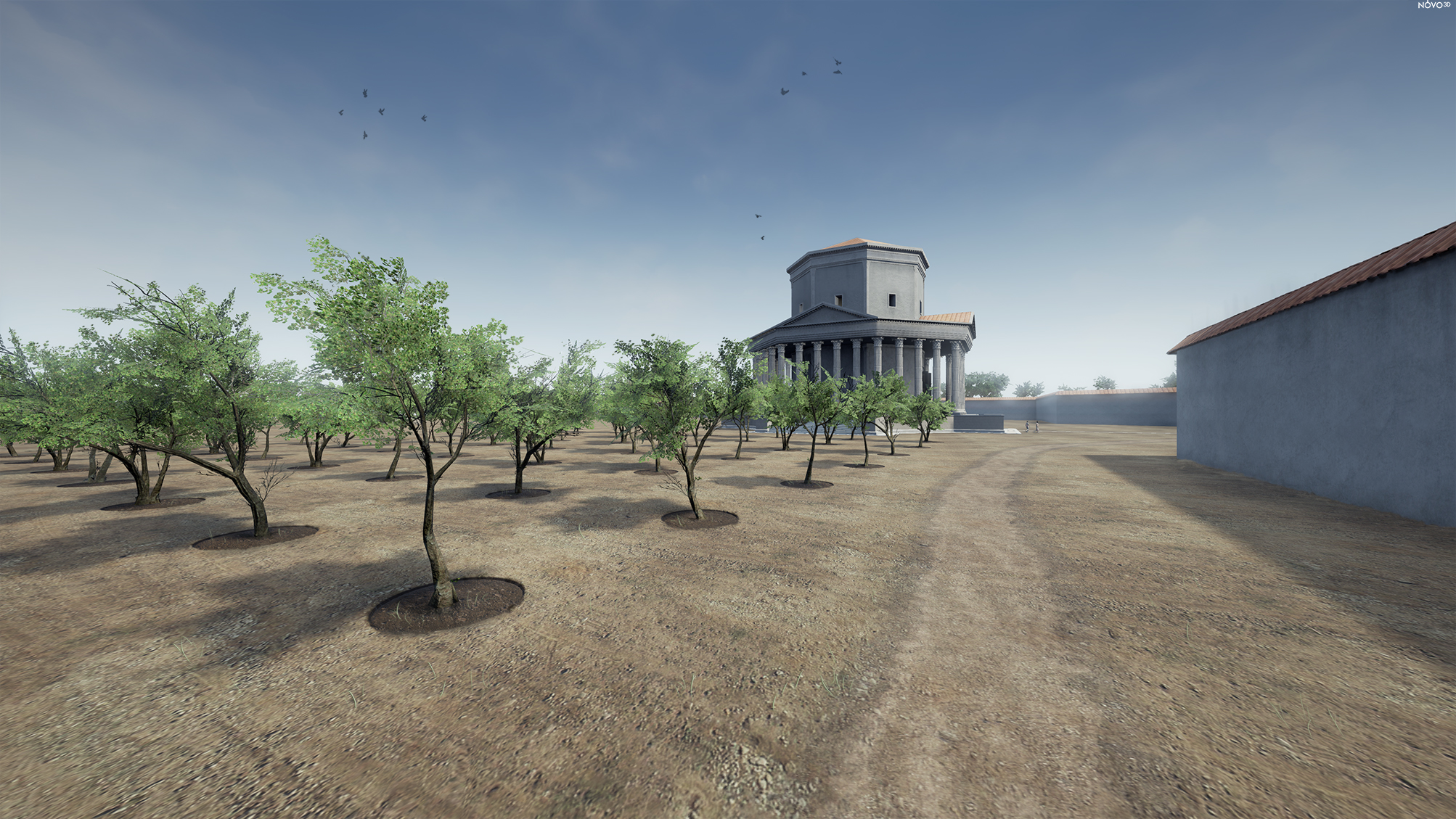
3D reconstruction of the temple

== See also ==
- Cassinomagus
- Roman baths
- Lemovices
- Via Agrippa
- Gallia Aquitania
- Roman architecture
