= Regio IV Templum Pacis =

Historical region of Rome

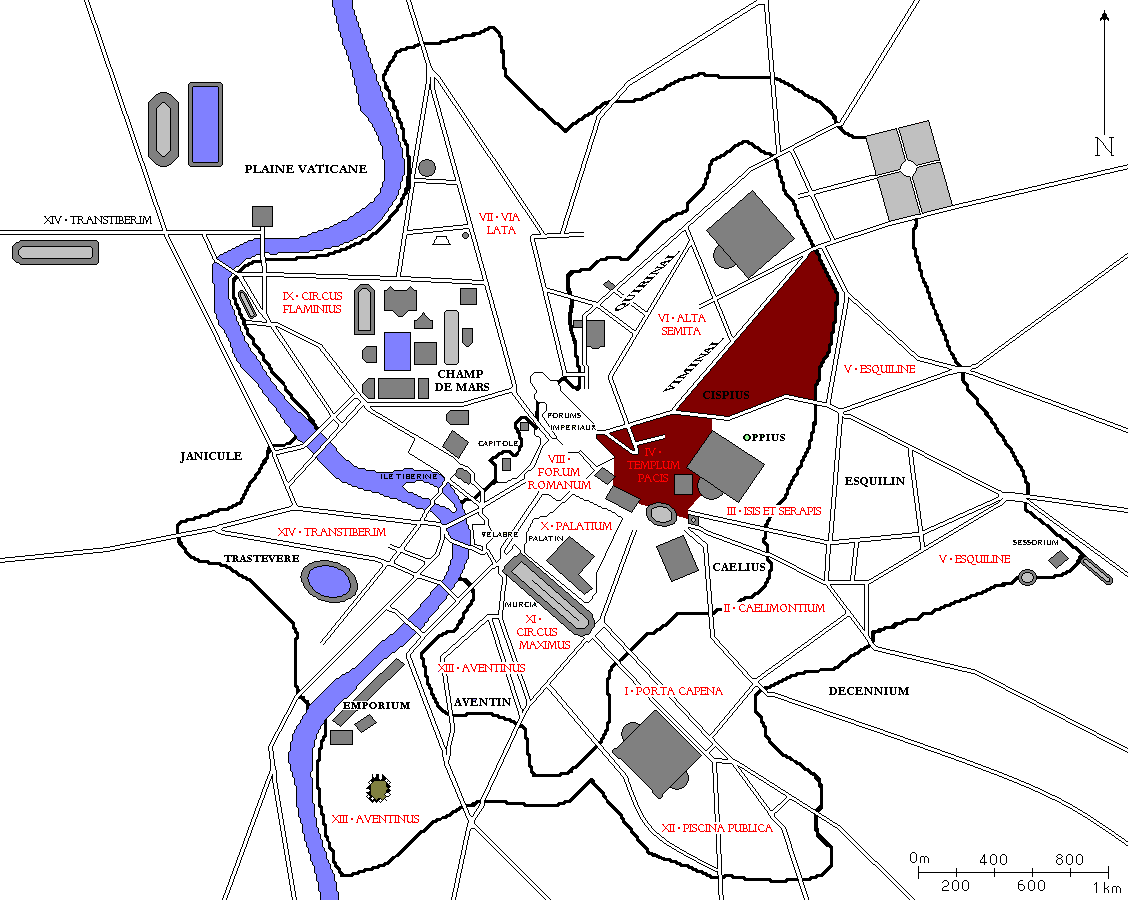

The Regio IV Templum Pacis is the fourth regio of imperial Rome, under Augustus's administrative reform. Regio IV took its name from the Temple of Peace built in the region by the emperor Vespasian. It includes the valley between the Esquiline and the Viminal hills, the popular area of the Suburra, and the Velian Hill.

== Geographic extent and important features ==
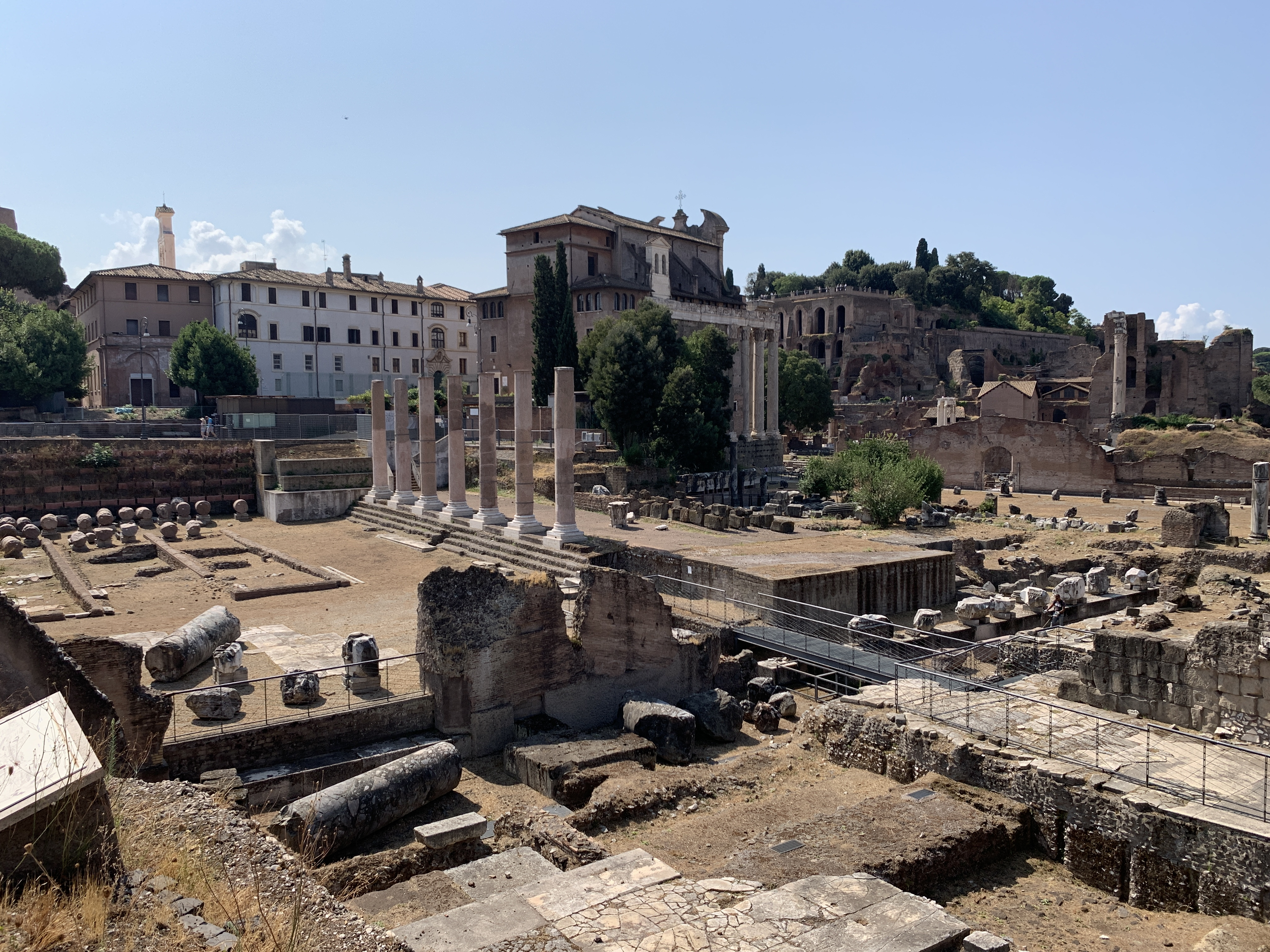
The remains of the Temple of Peace

Although centred on the Temple of Peace within the Imperial Fora, Regio IV was cut in two by the Clivus Suburanus. To the north west, it was bordered by the Vicus Patricius, the Clivus Suburanus and the Servian Wall and included the Carinae. To the south east, it was bordered by the Colosseum and the Roman Forum, and included the Imperial fora and the Suburra. A measurement taken at the end of the 4th century recorded that the perimeter of the region was 13,000 Roman feet (approximately 3.84 km).

When first organised by Augustus, Regio IV was initially called the Via Sacra, after the street of the same name. Its name was altered after the construction of the Temple of Peace by Vespasian, and the region was noted for its magnificent imperial buildings. Adjacent to the Colosseum stood the Meta Sudans of Domitian, a large monumental conical fountain estimated to have stood over 17 metres high. Also next to the Colosseum was the Colossus of Nero, itself standing some 30 metres high, that the emperor Hadrian later had moved to the stand beneath the double Temple of Venus and Roma, which was also in Regio IV. This was the largest temple in ancient Rome, and with its immense Corinthian pillars and gilt roof, it was reckoned by the historian Ammianus Marcellinus as one of the greatest buildings of Rome.

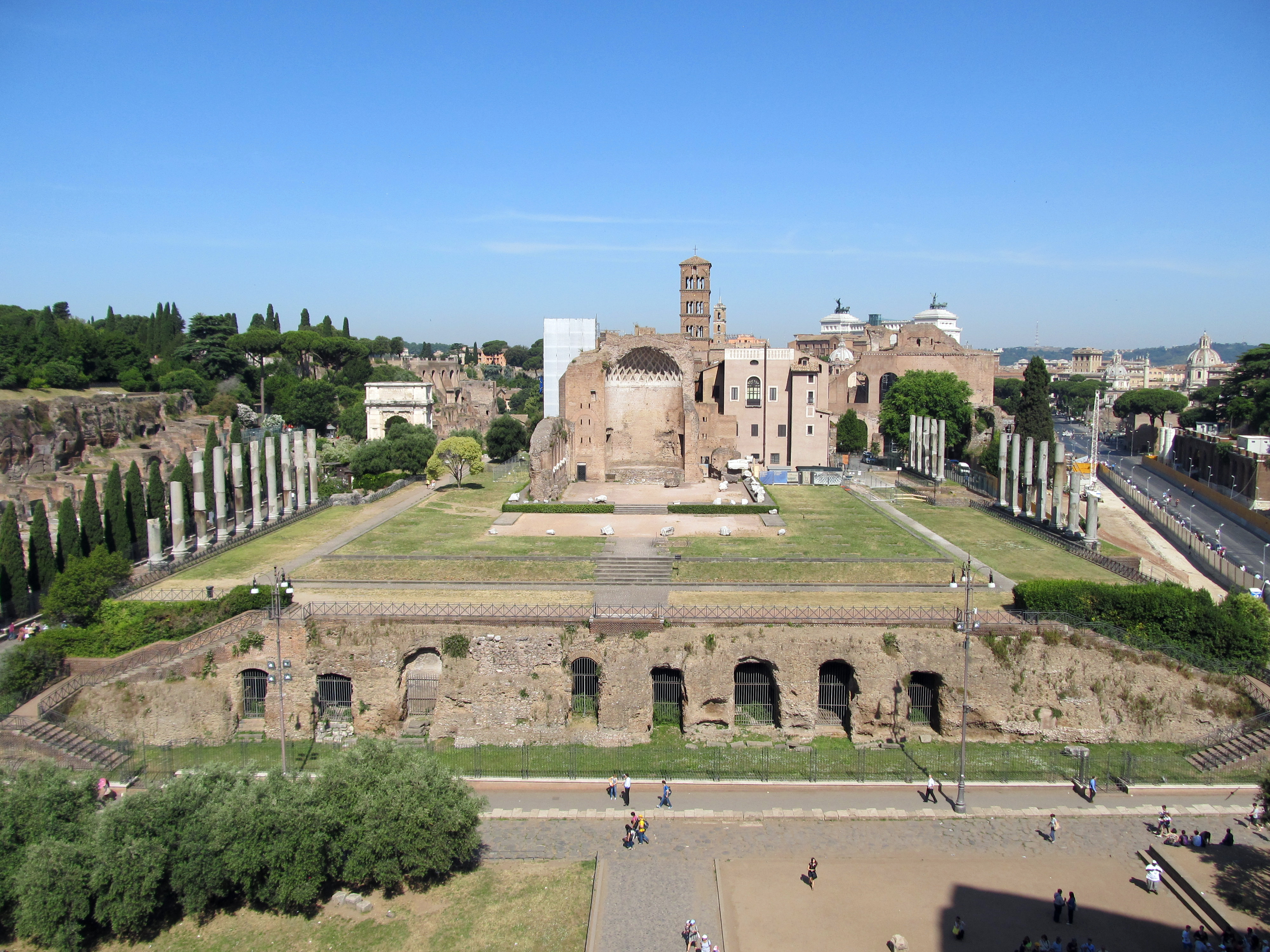
Temple of Venus and Roma

Adjacent and to the north of the Temple of Venus and Roma stood the Basilica of Maxentius, which was inaugurated by Constantine the Great after his victory over his rival Maxentius. Further north, there stood the Temple of Peace and the Forum Pacis which, along with the Forum Transitorium bordered the southernmost part of the Imperial Fora (the fora formed part of the seventh region).

The region also contained a temple dedicated to Jupiter Startor, most likely the one built during the Flavian period. This temple no longer exists, but the Temple of Antoninus and Faustina that faces the Roman Forum still stands. Next to it stands the remains of the Basilica Aemilia, which had been originally erected in 179 BCE before being remodelled and renamed as the Basilica Paulli.

Away from the immediate vicinity of the Roman Forum, the region contained the Temple of Tellus, sited at the Carinae. An old temple, it was restored by Cicero in about 54 BCE and then rebuilt after the Great Fire of Rome in 64 CE. Finally it included the Sororium Tigillum, on the Vicus Cyprius, which the ancient Romans built to the memory of Horatius.

The region also originally contained the Velian Hill, the hill between the Palatine and the Oppian Hill. This hill was removed in the early 20th century to make way for the Via dei Fori Imperiali, the street passing between the Forum Romanum and the Forum of Augustus).

At the turn of the 5th century, the Regio contained eight aediculae (shrines), 88 domūs (patrician houses), 18 horrea (warehouses), 75 balneae (bath houses) and 78 loci (fountains).

== Subdivisions ==
At the turn of the 5th century, the Regio was divided into eight vici (districts) and 2,757 insulae (blocks). It had two curators and was served by 48 Roman magistrates.
