= Suburra =

Neighbourhood of Ancient Rome

- Subura
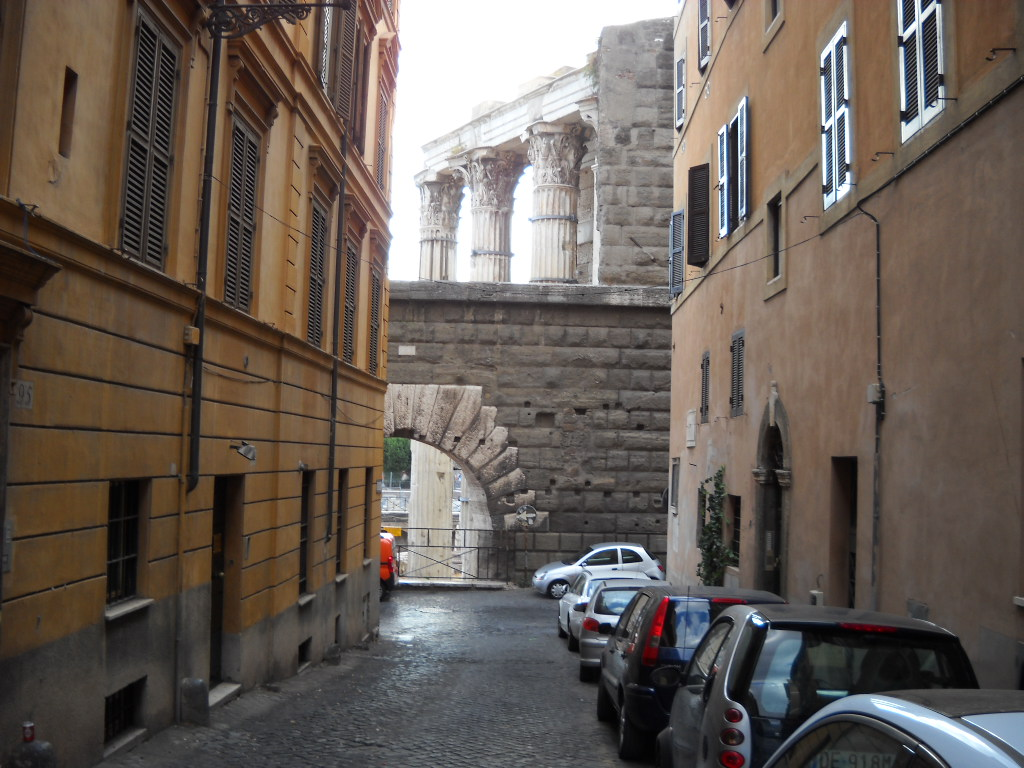
- Via Baccina with the Wall of Suburra, Arco dei Pantani and the Temple of Mars Ultor
- Interactive map of Suburra
- Type: Urban neighborhood
- Cultures: Ancient Rome
- Location: Rome, Italy

The Suburra, or Subura (from the Latin Subura) was a vast and populous neighborhood of Ancient Rome, located below the Murus Terreus on the Carinae and stretching on the slopes of the Quirinal and Viminal hills up to the offshoots of the Esquiline (Oppian, Cispian and Fagutal hills).

Since the lower part of the neighbourhood – although overlooking an area of monuments and public services – was home to an urban underclass who lived in miserable conditions, as well as a pleasure district, the term suburra has remained in the Italian language with the generic meaning of 'disreputable place", "place of ill repute" or similar.

Julius Caesar lived in a family home (domus) in the Suburra until, in 63 BC, he was elected pontifex maximus at the age of 37. The Suburra had grown up around the property many years before his birth. The poet Martial also lived there.

== History ==
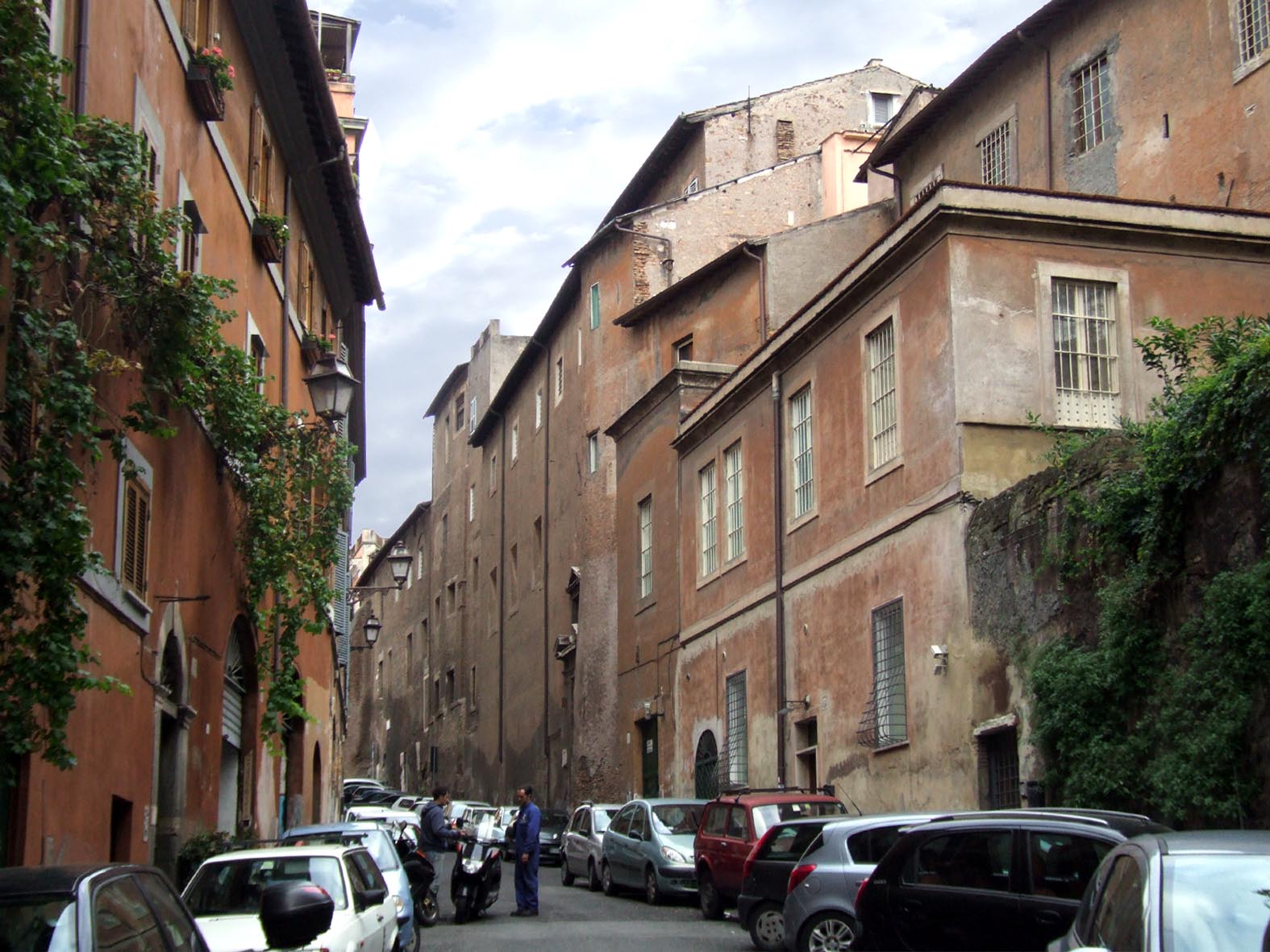
Via in Selci, following the route of the former Clivus Suburanus

The Suburra was originally part of the so-called Septimontium, an area of the city associated with a religious procession that was celebrated on 11 January of each year since the reign of Numa Pompilius.

The neighborhood was crossed by the street called Argiletum (broadly corresponding to the present Via Leonina and Via della Madonna dei Monti), which came to a fork near the Cispian Hill: the Vicus Patricius (now Via Urbana), towards the Porta Viminalis in the republican wall, and the Clivus Suburanus (now Via in Selci), towards Porta Esquilina. This last street marked the border between the Regio IV and the Regio V of the Augustan subdivision of the city.

Beginning in the 1st century BC, the lower part of the valley was first occupied by the Forum of Caesar, inaugurated in 46 BC under the eastern slope of the Capitolium, and then by the Forum of Augustus, inaugurated in 2 BC. Further additions towards the valley of the Colosseum were the Temple of Peace in AD 75, the Forum of Nerva inaugurated in AD 97 and finally – following the excavation of the hollow between the Quirinal Hill and the Capitolium – the Trajan's Forum, inaugurated in AD 112. In the time of Augustus, these monumental areas were protected from fires, which frequently broke out in the popular tenements of the Suburra, by building the massive wall that still survives today and represents the only trace of the ancient Suburra within the modern city.

In the Middle Ages, aristocratic families built houses and towers on the ruins of the Suburra and the Forums: some of them are still preserved, though greatly modified, such as Torre dei Conti and Torre del Grillo.

The urban fabric of the neighborhood, now a part of the rione Monti, was heavily altered by the opening of Via Cavour and Via degli Annibaldi at the end of the 19th century, while the demolitions of the 1930s for the construction of Via dell'Impero (now Via dei Fori Imperiali) destroyed all the civil and religious buildings which, from the Renaissance onwards, had been erected in the Forums.

== The Wall of Suburra ==
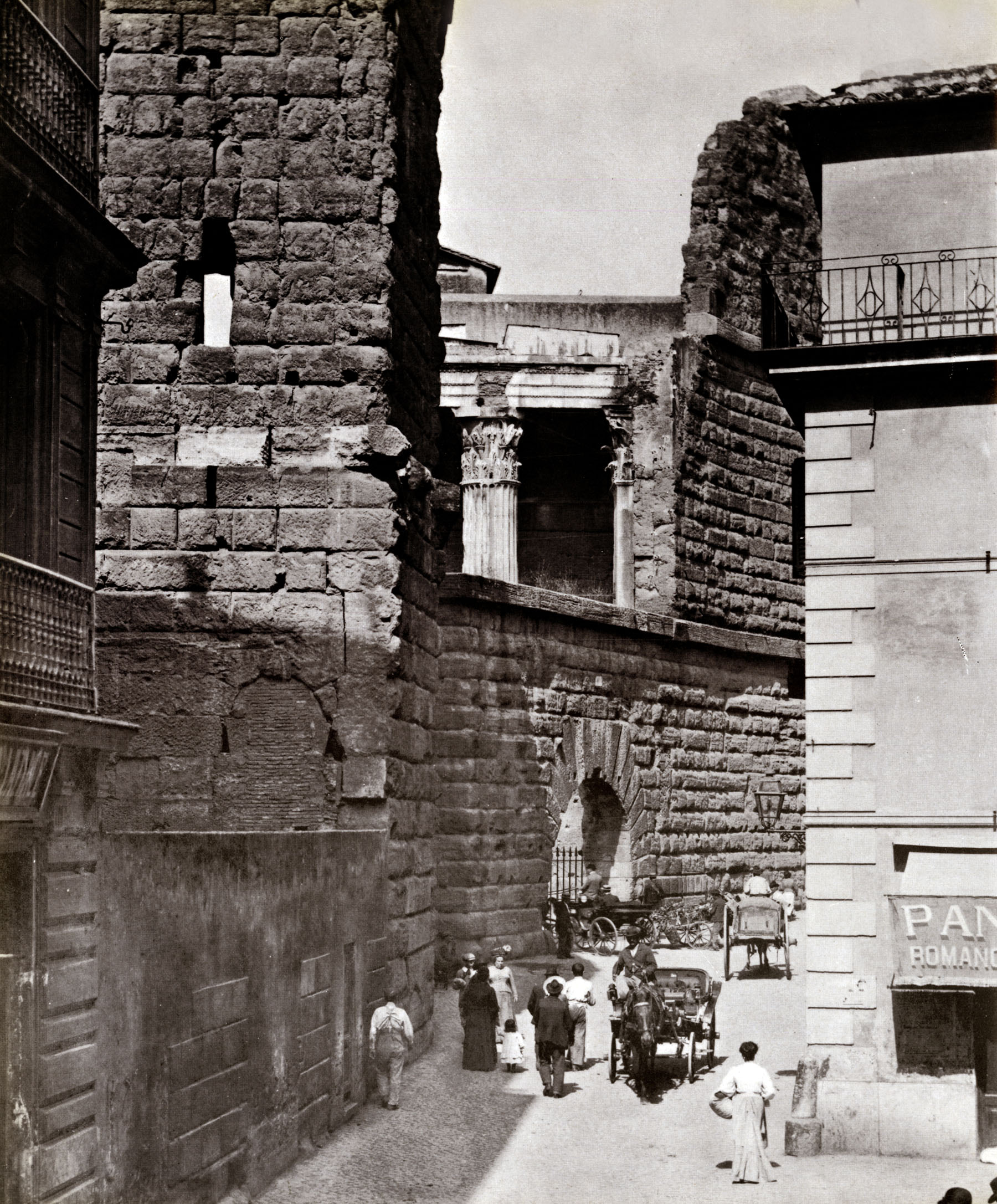
The Wall of Suburra and Arco dei Pantani (1880 ca.)

The wall of Suburra is an isodomum wall, stretching 33 metres (108.3 ft) from the ground level of the Forum and built in peperino and Gabine stone (lapis gabinum), which ancient Romans thought was particularly resistant to fire. The boulders with which it is made – arranged into highly precise laying surfaces – are not linked by mortar, but only connected to each other by dovetail oak joints, and the wall, interspersed with three travertine recesses, has stood for over 2000 years to its own weight.

At the time of its construction, the wall served several functions: it was a protection against fire, an element of separation between the residential area of the city and the public one, and a monumental backdrop of the Temple of Mars Ultor, to which it created a strong color contrast.

The access road to the Forum passed alongside the Temple of Mars Ultor, through the arch in travertine blocks which is still existing and visible, which during Middle Ages was called "Arco dei Pantani" (Italian for "Arch of the Quagmires"), due to the gradual swamping of the Forum area.

== Geographic location ==
The orography of the area – with the hollow between the slopes of the major hills merging into the valley between the Capitoline and Palatine hills towards the Tiber – conditioned the road system and the development of the neighborhood: the higher areas hosted the houses of senators and equites (remains can be found under the present churches of San Pietro in Vincoli, on the Fagutal, and Santa Pudenziana, on the Viminal Hill), while the valley floor, the most popular and infamous part, was occupied by large insulae (multi-storey residential buildings with tabernae on the ground floor), such as those found during the restoration of the monastery of San Martino ai Monti.

== In popular culture ==
The neighborhood is featured in Colleen McCullough's Masters of Rome, in Steven Saylor's Roman Blood, in Martha Marks' Rubies of the Viper, in the SPQR series by John Maddox Roberts, as well as Netflix's first original motion picture in Italy, Suburra, and its prequel Suburra: Blood on Rome.

== See also ==
- Monti (rione of Rome)
- Via Alessandrina
- Santa Maria ai Monti
- San Lorenzo in Fonte
- Sant'Agata de' Goti
- Via Cavour
- Vicus Patricius
