= Regio VI Alta Semita =

Historical region of Rome

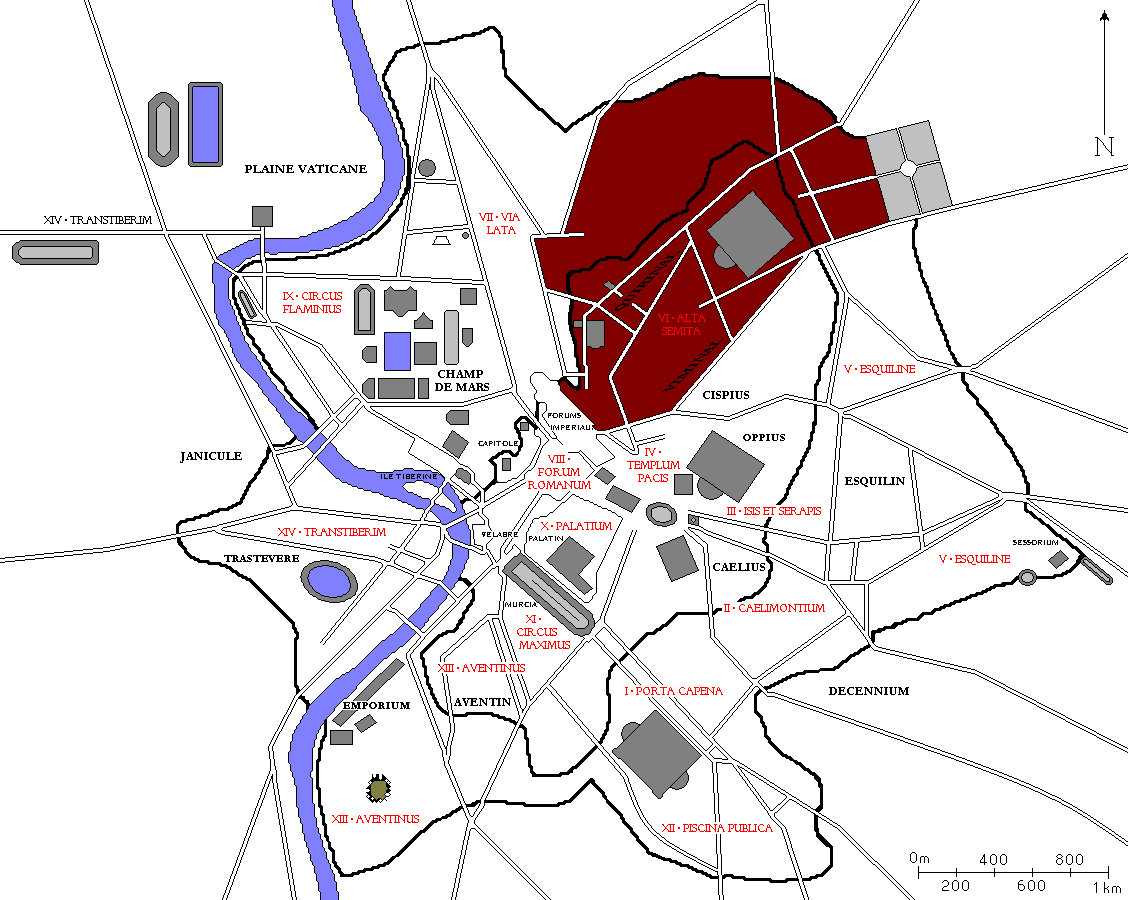

The Regio VI Alta Semita is the sixth regio of imperial Rome, under Augustus's administrative reform. Regio VI took its name from the street (Alta Semita, "High Path") passing over the Quirinal Hill. It was a large regio that also encompassed the Viminal Hill, the lower slopes of the Pincian, and the valleys in-between.

== Geographic extent and important features ==
Regio VI was defined by its principal artery, the Alta Semita, which led from the Quirinal through the Porta Collina to the Porta Nomentana. The Aurelian Wall marked most of its eastern and northern edge along with the Via Salaria vetus, with the Argiletum and Vicus Patricius on the south and southeast. The three principal gates that ran through the walls in this region were the Porta Nomentana, Porta Salaria and the Porta Pinciana. A measurement taken at the end of the 4th century recorded that the perimeter of the region was 15,700 Roman feet (approximately 4.64km).

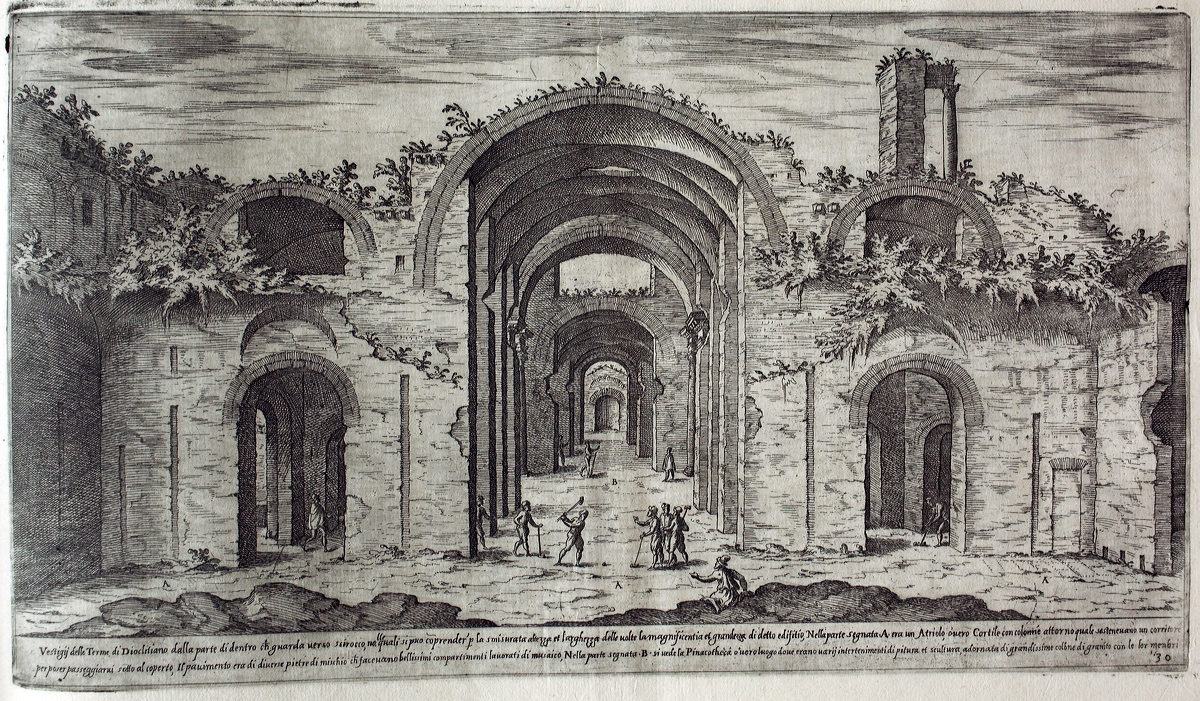
Drawing of the ruins of the Baths of Diocletian (1575)

Located in this region were some of the oldest temples in Rome. Firstly, on the Quirinal, was an ancient temple noted for its beauty, the Temple of Salus. According to the 5th century Notitia, the Temple of Flora was also located in this region, very near the even older Capitolium Vetus, reportedly built by Numa Pompilius and dedicated to the Capitoline Triad, and the predecessor to the Temple of Jupiter Optimus Maximus on the Capitoline Hill. Also near the Capitolium was the Temple of Quirinus, one of the most beautiful sanctuaries in the city and restored by Augustus, as well as a statue dedicated to Mamurius Veturius.

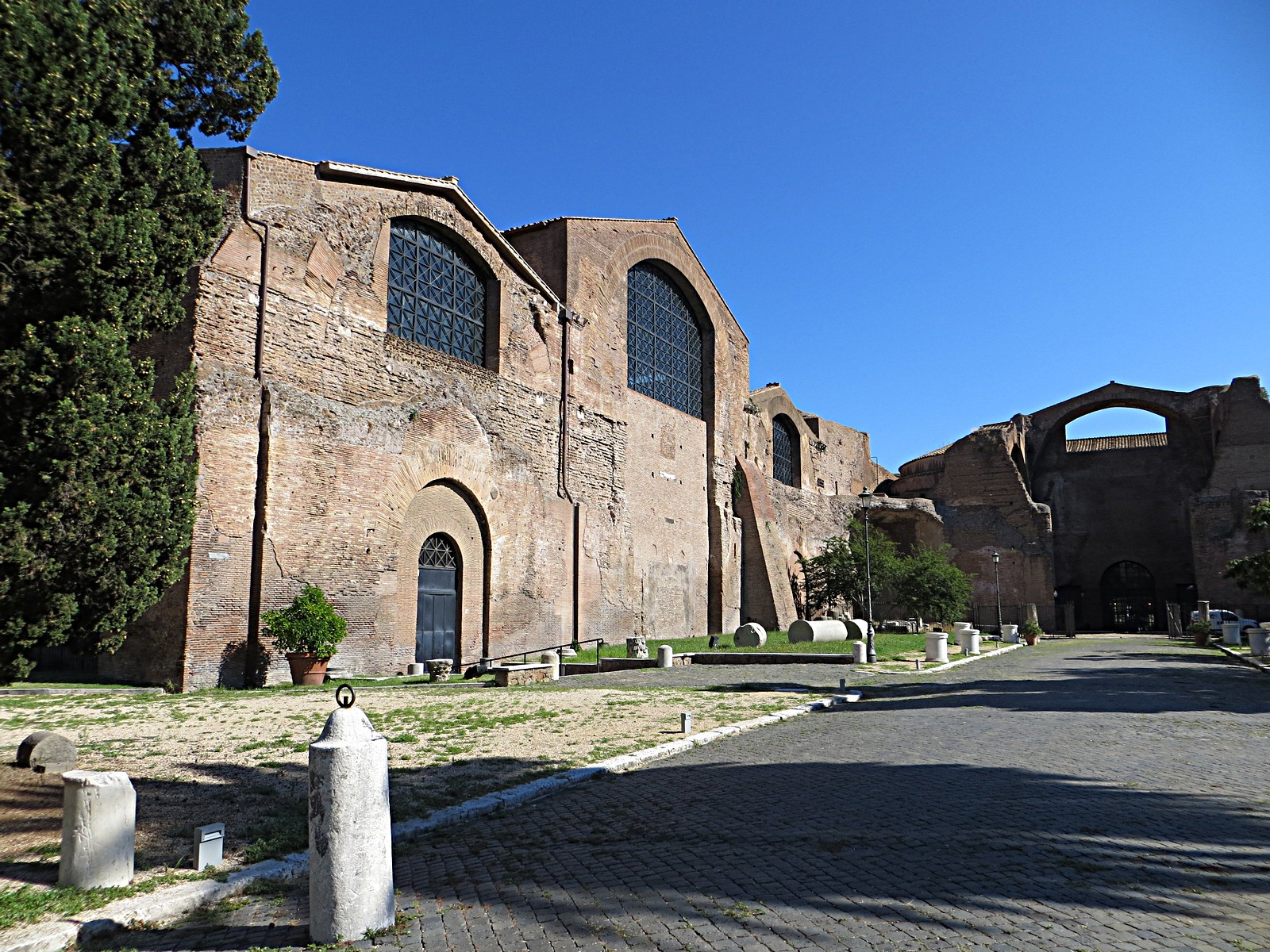
The remains of the Baths of Diocletian

This region also contained the last two public baths built in ancient Rome: the Baths of Constantine on the Quirinal (demolished and in its place sits the Quirinal Palace), and the Baths of Diocletian on the Viminal, the largest of the imperial baths, whose ruins are still visible and partially occupied by the Church of Santa Maria degli Angeli e dei Martiri. In front of the Baths of Constantine stood the colossal marble statues of the Horse Tamers.

The northern section of the region was dominated by the Gardens of Sallust. This entertainment complex was the first public area of Rome destroyed when Alaric I penetrated the city through the gardens and was never restored. Nearby was the street where the emperor Domitian was born, the Malum Punicium, the site of which he later built the Temple of the gens Flavia where his ashes were placed.

The region also contained the Castra Praetoria, the barracks where the Praetorian Guard were housed. It was here that the auctioning of the emperorship took place after the murder of Pertinax, between Didius Julianus and Titus Flavius Claudius Sulpicianus. Finally, also within this region was the station of the third cohort of the Vigiles. At the turn of the 5th century, the Regio contained 17 aediculae (shrines), 146 domūs (patrician houses), 18 horrea (warehouses), 75 balneae (bath houses) and 73 loci (fountains).

== Subdivisions ==
At the turn of the 5th century, the Regio was divided into 17 vici (districts) and 3,403 insulae (blocks). It had two curators and was served by 48 Roman magistrates.
