= Regio V Esquiliae =

Historical region of Rome

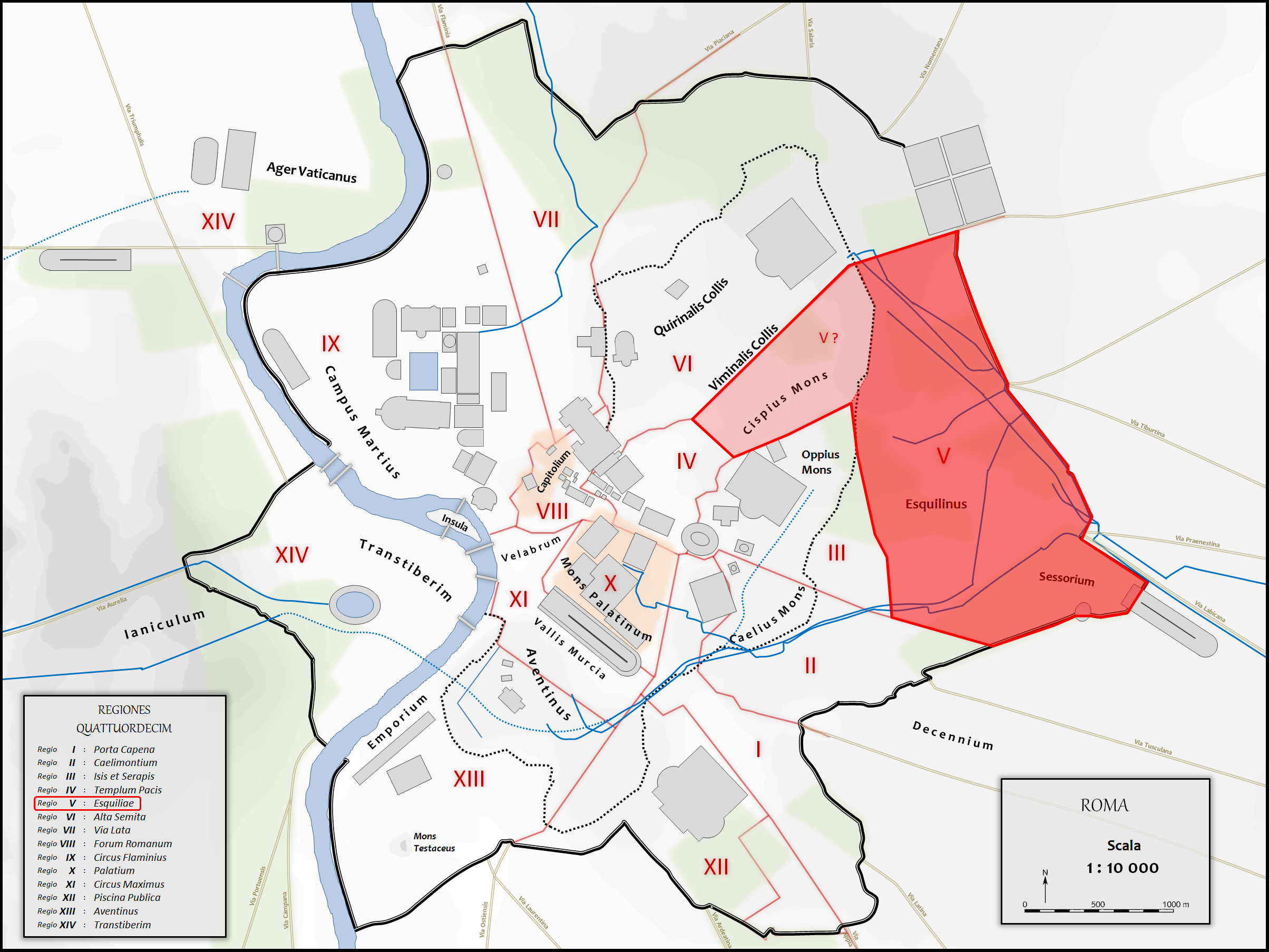

The Regio V Esquiliae is the fifth regio of imperial Rome, under Augustus's administrative reform. Regio V took its name from the Esquiline Hill. It contains parts of the Oppian Hill and Cispian Hill (two minor hills close to the city center) and of the Esquiline, plus the plain just outside the Servian Wall.

== Geographic extent and important features ==
Regio V was dominated by the limits of the Esquiline Hill and its northern and southern extensions, the Oppian and Cispian Hills respectively. Its western and southern limits were eventually enclosed by the Aurelian Walls, while to the north its limit was the Vicus Patricius and the Clivus Suburanus to the east. One of the larger regions due to the inclusion of the Campus Esquilinus, a measurement taken at the end of the 4th century recorded that the perimeter of the region was 15,600 Roman feet (approximately 4.61km).

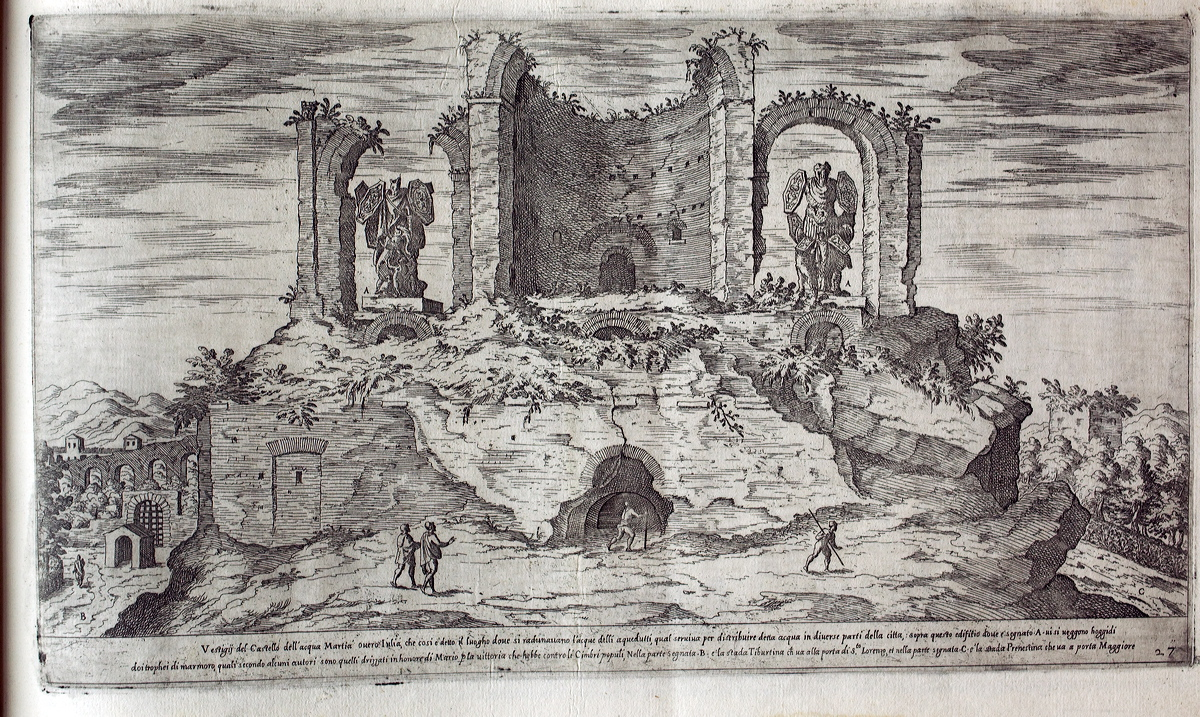
Drawing of the so-called Trophy of Marius in situ on the Esquiline (1575)

The region of the Esquiline was mainly inhabited by the poorest classes in the city, and the emperors of the second and third centuries provided a number of pleasure-grounds and baths for their convenience. Chief amongst these was the Lake of Orpheus, a large man-made reservoir dominated by a statue of Orpheus. It was situated close by the Church of Santa Lucia in Selci. Another fountain, this one containing a magnificent façade, was the Nymphaeum of Alexander, erected by Severus Alexander, and was probably fed off the Aqua Julia. The remains of the fountain were long mistakenly called the Trophy of Marius and it situated where the modern Piazza Vittorio Emanuele II lies. Additional entertainment was also provided in the Amphitheatrum Castrense, an amphitheatre built in the third century during the Severan period.

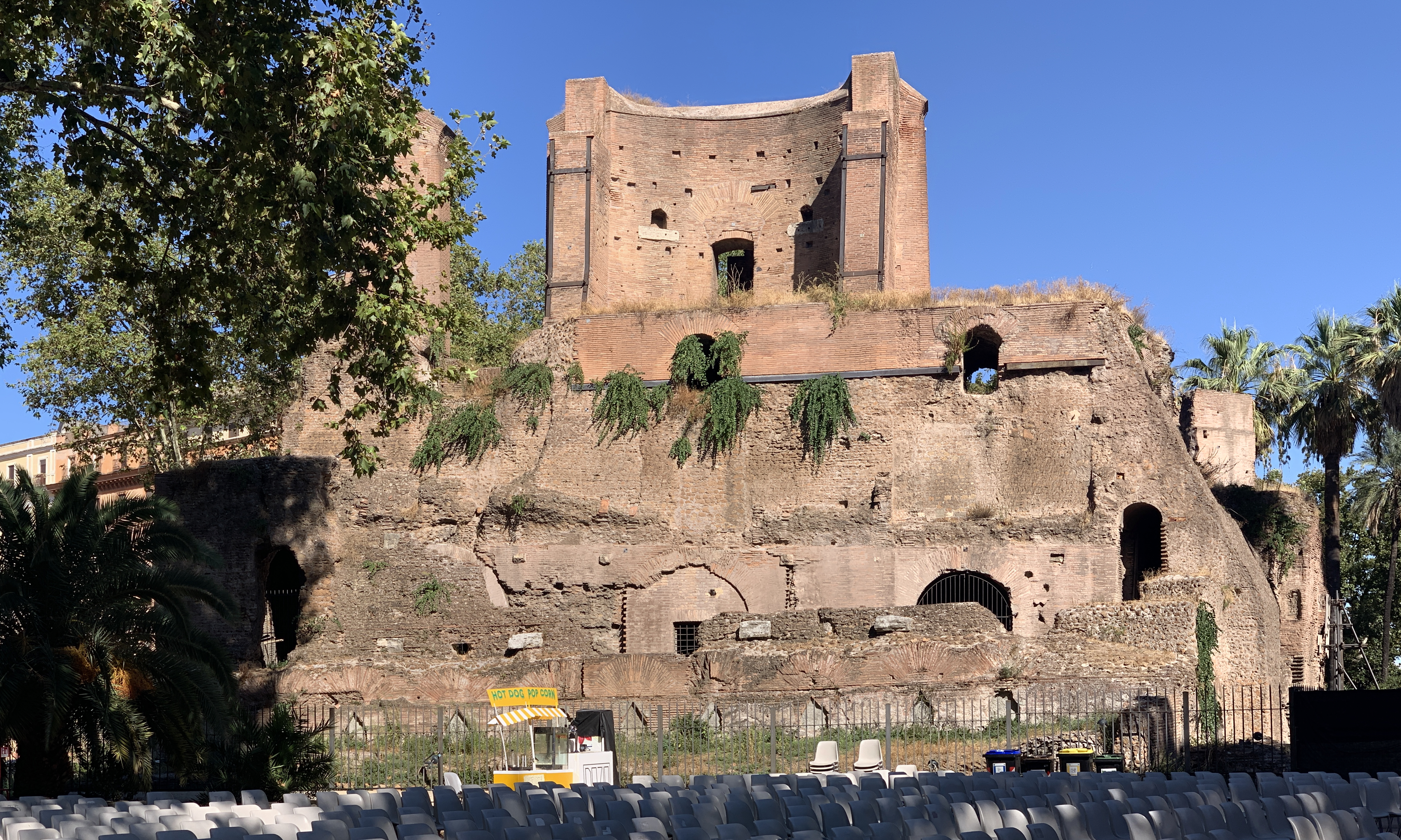
The remains of the so-called Trophy of Marius

The region also contained the Macellum Liviae, a shopping complex built by Augustus in honour of his wife Livia, the location of which is now occupied by the Basilica of Santa Maria Maggiore and surrounding streets. The region was also the site of the station of the second cohort of the Vigiles, beyond which grew the Gardens of Pallas, established by Pallas, the secretary of the emperor Claudius. A Temple to Hercules, possibly the Temple of Hercules Custos existed in this region, along with another nymphaeum, the so-called Temple of Minerva Medica. The area also included a sanctuary to the goddess Isis, the Isidem patriciam, situated on the Vicus Patricius; this street also contained the Baths of Novatus. Finally, the Thermae of Olympias was also in this region, on the southern slopes of the Viminal Hill, which the Church of San Lorenzo in Panisperna now occupies.

The region contained two flat plains, both beyond the Servian Walls – the Campus Viminalis and the Campus Esquilinus. At the turn of the 5th century, the Regio contained 15 aediculae (shrines), 180 domūs (patrician houses), 22 horrea (warehouses), 75 balneae (bath houses) and 74 loci (fountains).

== Subdivisions ==
At the turn of the 5th century, the Regio was divided into 15 vici (districts) and 3,850 insulae (blocks). It had two curators and was served by 48 Roman magistrates.
