= Vicus Patricius =

Street in Rome, Italy

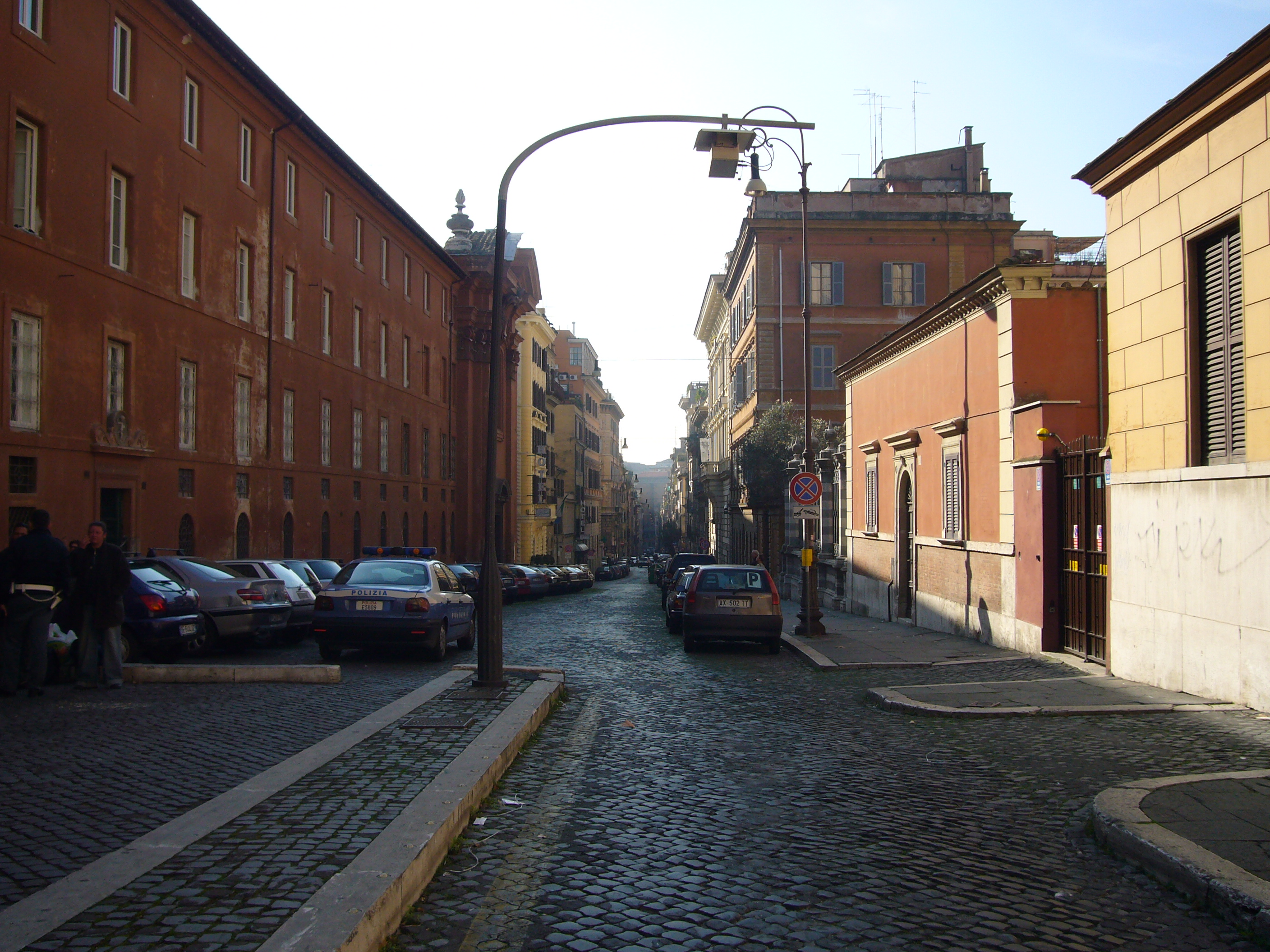
- The historical route of Via Urbana in Rome, which overlaps the former Vicus Patricius, the "residential" road leading down to the Suburra
- Interactive map of Vicus Patricius
- Type: Urban street
- Periods: Ancient Rome
- Location: Rome
- Region: Regio IV Templum Pacis, Regio VI Alta Semita

Vicus Patricius was a street in ancient Rome, whose route corresponds to that of the present Via Urbana.
It started from the point where the Argiletum branched into clivus Suburanus and vicus Patricius, crossed the Cispian and the Viminal hills and reached the Porta Viminalis in the Servian Wall.

It probably marked the border between the IV and VI regions of ancient Rome.
Along its course rose the only temple of Diana to which male people had no access. There was also a domus, demolished at the beginning of the reign of Antoninus Pius to erect the Baths of Novatus (Thermae Novati or Novatianae), which were in turn converted, not before the 4th century, into the Basilica di Santa Pudenziana. In 1848, the excavations of another large domus overlooking the vicus, near the present Via Graziosa, brought to light a house of the Republican era, decorated with a fresco depicting scenes from the Odyssey.

In the 5th century, the presbyter Ilicius built a portico (Porticus Ilicii) that ran along the vicus for about 1,300 feet (400 m), from the sanctuary of the martyr Hyppolitus (the present church of San Lorenzo in Fonte) up to Santa Pudenziana.

== Bibliography ==
- Samuel Ball Platner, "Vici", A Topographical Dictionary of Ancient Rome, Oxford University Press, 1929, p. 576.
