= Clivus =

Clivus (Latin for "slope", "rise") can refer to

- Clivus toilet
- Clivus (anatomy)
- Clivus (road), a kind of Roman road (e.g. the clivus suburanus)
  - Clivus Capitolinus
