= Temple of Peace, Rome =

Temple dedicated to the goddess Pax in ancient Rome

Temple of Peace
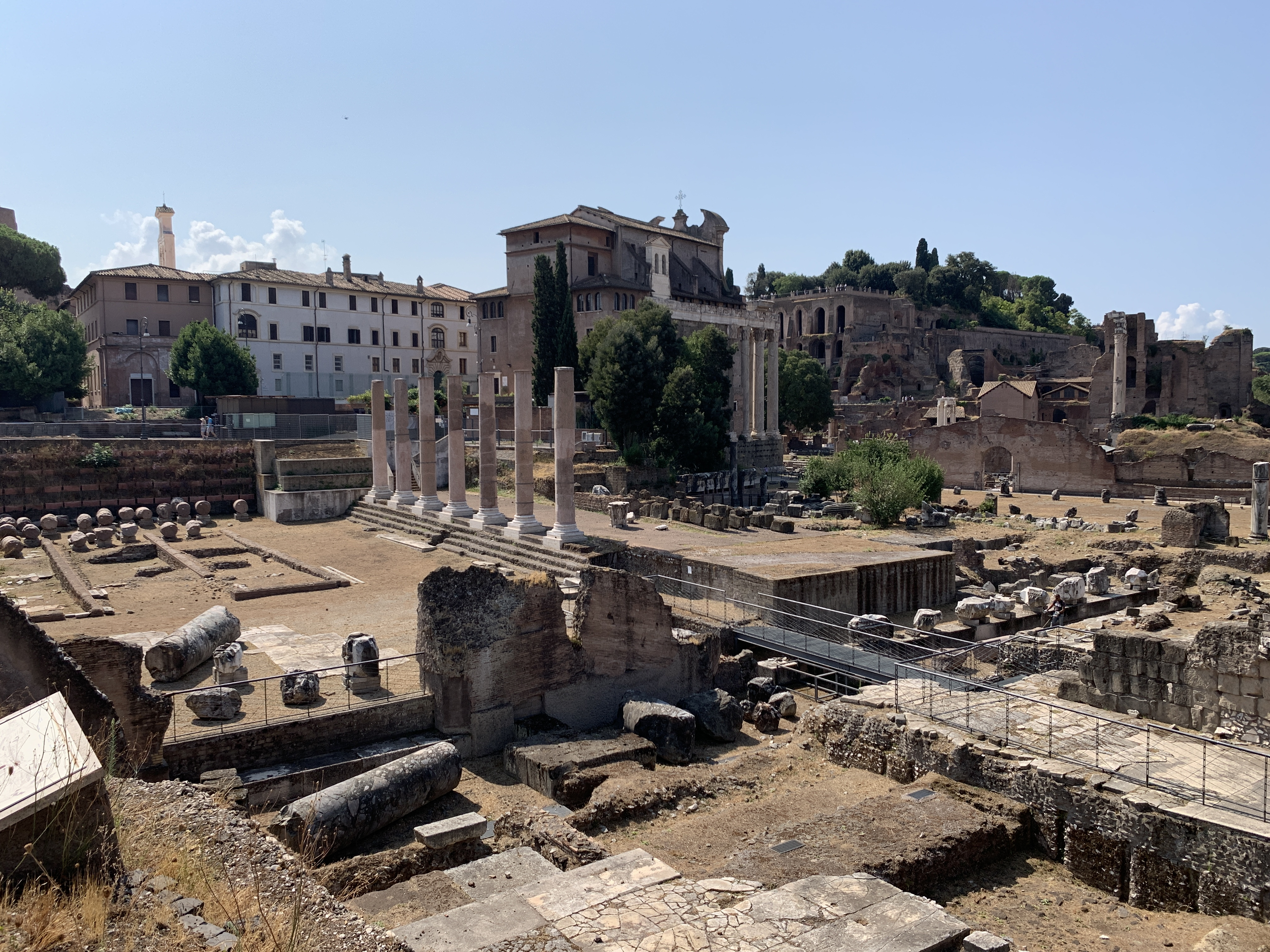
- Remains of the Temple of Peace

- Shown within Augustan Rome
- Interactive map of Temple of Peace
- 41°53′33″N 12°29′15″E

The Temple of Peace (Latin: Templum Pacis), also known as the Forum of Vespasian (Latin: Forum Vespasiani), was built in Rome in 71 AD under Emperor Vespasian in honour to Pax, the Roman goddess of peace.

Positioned southeast of the Roman Forum, between the Via Sacra and the Carinae, the temple stood on the southeast side of the Argiletum, offering a view of the Velian Hill and overlooking the renowned Colosseum.

It housed artifacts such as the Table of Shewbread and the seven-branched menorah from the Jerusalem Temple, which were taken as spoils during the siege of Jerusalem in 70 AD.

== History ==
Statius claims that Emperor Domitian was largely responsible for the completion of the temple, not Vespasian - this issue remains controversial within the archaeological world today. The Temple of Peace is part of the Imperial Fora which is "a series of monumental fora (public squares), constructed in Rome over a period of one and a half centuries." It is not officially considered a forum because there is no evidence of it serving a political function, therefore it is called a temple.

The funds to create this grand monument were acquired through Vespasian's sacking of Jerusalem during the Jewish–Roman wars. The interior and surrounding buildings were decorated with the treasures collected there by the Roman army. According to Pliny the Elder, statues brought from Greece and Asia Minor by Nero to furnish his Domus Aurea also came to reside in the Temple of Peace. Among these were works by the Greek sculptors Polykleitos, Phidias, Naukydes of Argos, Myron, and Leochares. The Severan-era bases and inscriptions from two of these statues survive: the Ganymede of Leochares and the Pythocles of Polykleitos.

Because Vespasian was both a leading general and later appointed emperor during the first war, the Temple of Peace was especially important to him as a leader. A grand and significant monument such as this is vital to the promotion of a powerful, strong public image of the emperor, and is a symbol of the peace and prosperity Vespasian was able to bring the empire.

The temple was destroyed by fire in February 192 AD. It was subsequently restored by Septimius Severus sometime around 203 AD. The halls were remodeled a century later, and were admired by the emperor Constantius II during his visit to Rome in 357 AD.

If still in use by the 4th-century, the temple would have been closed during the persecution of pagans in the late Roman Empire, when the Christian Emperors issued edicts prohibiting all non-Christian worship and sanctuaries.

The Temple of Peace was damaged during the sack of Rome in 410 by Alaric I and was never restored after the event. The historian Procopius writes that Alaric looted the emerald-encrusted treasures of Solomon, which, scholar Robert Coates-Stephens believes must have been stored in the complex, as the treasures comprised the main part of Flavian's original booty.

The adjacent Basilica of Maxentius was long believed to be the actual temple. The archaeologist Antonio Nibby made the correct identification in the 19th century.

== Structure of the Temple ==
Although very little remains of the Temple of Peace in Rome today, much about its structure and layout are known due to the Forma Urbis, a large, detailed marble map of Rome and its buildings that was originally hung on a wall inside the temple itself in the 3rd century. The temple was made up of an apse that opened into a large portico. Columns separated the temple from the central unpaved, grassy area. This was different from the majority of other fora, which were typically paved. This area probably featured gardens, pools, statues, and other treasures acquired during the conquest of Jerusalem.

== See also ==
- List of Ancient Roman temples

Preceded by Forum of Nerva	Landmarks of Rome; Forum of Vespasian	Succeeded by Trajan's Forum
