= Temple of Hercules Custos =

Temple in ancient Rome

The Temple of Hercules Custos (Latin: Aedes Herculis Custodis) was a Roman temple dedicated to 'Hercules the Guardian'. Its location is unknown and no remains have been found, although a Temple to Hercules linked to Lucius Cornelius Sulla (the Herculem Sullanum) was noted as standing in the region of the Esquiline Hill during the late 4th century.

Its history is unclear. Ovid writes that it was to the west of the Circus Flaminius - it was probably built around the same time (221 BC). It was re-built by Sulla after consulting the Sibylline Oracles. This consultation of the oracles and the epithet 'Custos' seems to imply it was built and/or rebuilt in response to a major crisis, though it is unknown what its nature was.

In 218 BC, the senate decreed a supplicatio in the Aedes Herculi. Though there were several temples of Hercules, this probably refers to that of Hercules Custos. The decemvirs ordered a statue to be set up in the temple of Hercules Custos in 189 BC.

== See also ==
- List of Ancient Roman temples

== Bibliography ==
- L. Richardson, jr, A New Topographical Dictionary of Ancient Rome, Baltimore - London 1992, pp. 186. ISBN 0801843006
