= Temple of Venus and Roma =

Ancient Roman temple in Rome

- Aedes Veneris et Romae (Latin)
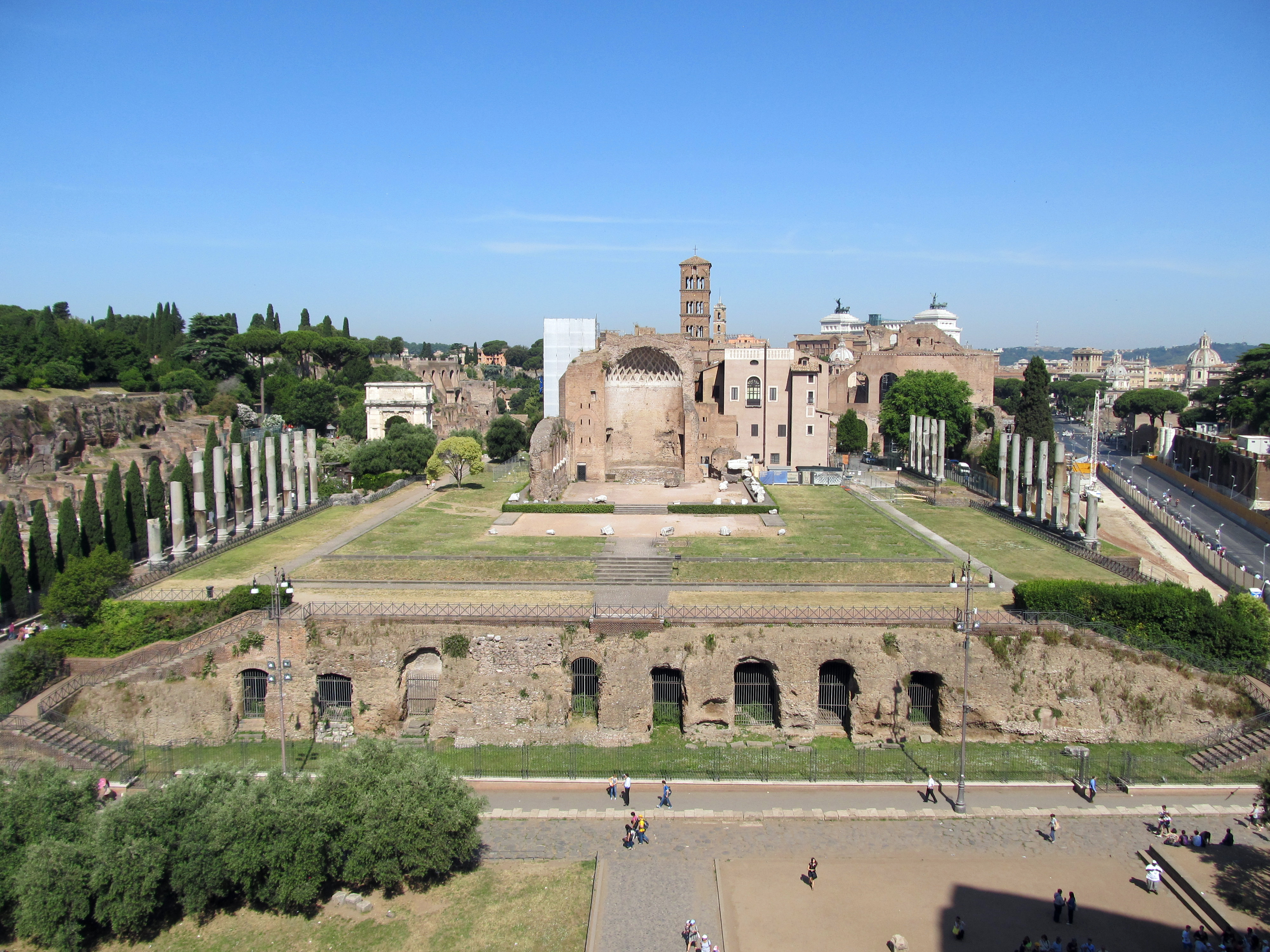
- Temple of Venus and Roma seen from the Colosseum

- Location within Rome
- Interactive map of Temple of Venus and Roma
- 41°53′27″N 12°29′23″E
- Type: Roman temple
- Location: Regio IV Templum Pacis

History
- Built: 135 AD
- Built by: Hadrian

The Temple of Venus and Roma (Latin: Aedes Veneris et Romae) is thought to have been the largest temple in Ancient Rome. Located on the Velian Hill, between the eastern edge of the Forum Romanum and the Colosseum, it was dedicated to the goddesses Venus Felix (English: Venus the Bringer of Good Fortune) and Roma Aeterna (English: Eternal Rome).

The building was the creation of the emperor Hadrian and construction began in 121 AD. It was officially inaugurated by Hadrian in 135, and finished in 141 under Antoninus Pius. Damaged by fire in 307, it was restored with alterations by the emperor Maxentius.

== History ==
The temple was erected on the remains of the Domus Transitoria and Domus Aurea, two mansions commissioned by the disgraced Emperor Nero. Buried intact beneath the temple is an elaborate domed rotunda from the Domus Transitoria, with marble-lined pools and paving in multicoloured opus sectile.

Unimpressed by Hadrian's architectural design for the temple, his architect, Apollodorus, made a scornful remark on the size of the seated statues within the cellae, saying that they would surely hurt their heads if they tried to stand up from their thrones. Apollodorus was banished and executed not long after this.

According to the ancient historian Ammianus Marcellinus, the temple was among the great buildings of Rome which astonished the Emperor Constantius II on his visit to the city in 357.

The sanctuary was closed during the persecution of pagans in the late Roman Empire. Restoration was performed under the short-lived usurper Eugenius (392–394), a Christian sympathetic to pagan worship. However, as with many of Rome's majestic ancient buildings, the temple was later targeted for its rich materials. In 630, with the consent of the Emperor Heraclius, Pope Honorius I removed the gilt-bronze tiles from the roof of the temple for the adornment of St. Peter's.

A severe earthquake at the beginning of the 9th century is believed to have destroyed the temple. Around 850 Pope Leo IV ordered the building of a new church, Santa Maria Nova, on the ruins of the temple. After a major rebuilding in 1612, this church was renamed Santa Francesca Romana, incorporating Roma's cella as the belltower. A veduta engraving by Giovanni Battista Mercati depicts the site in 1629. The vast quantity of marble that once adorned the temple has all but disappeared due to its use as a raw material for building projects from the Middle Ages onwards. The Italian archaeologist Rodolfo Lanciani makes reference to his discovery of a lime kiln in close proximity to the temple in his work The Destruction of Ancient Rome.

== Architecture ==
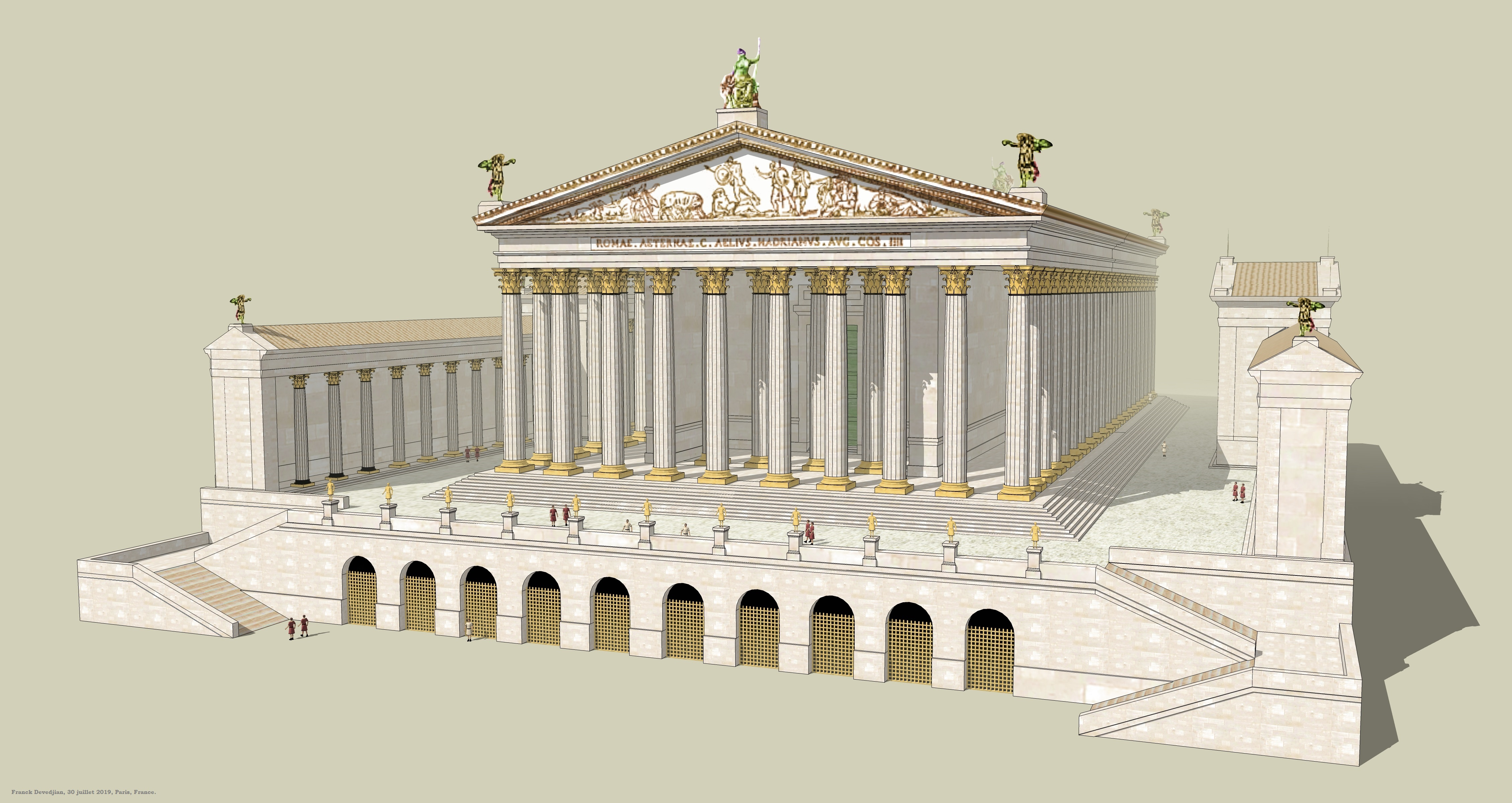
3D reconstruction of the temple as seen from the Colosseum

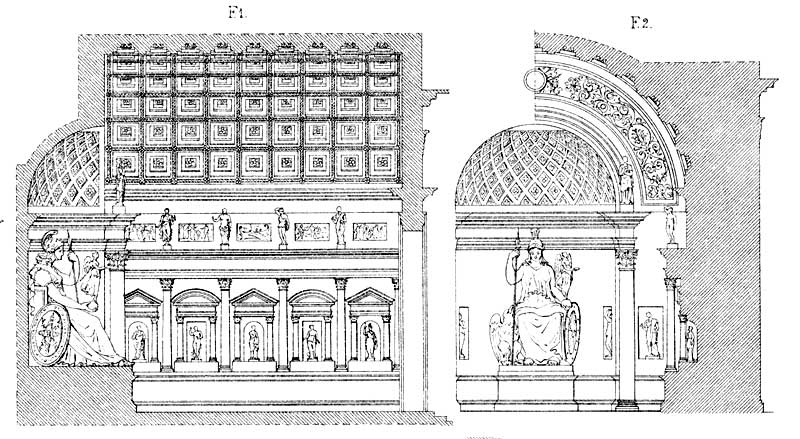
Longitudinal and transverse section drawings showing a recreation of one half of the temple.

Set on a podium measuring 145 metres (476 ft) x 100 metres (330 ft), the peripteral temple itself measured 110 metres (360 ft) x 53 metres (174 ft) and 31 metres (102 ft) high (counting the statues) and consisted of two main chambers (cellae), each housing a cult statue of a god—Venus, the goddess of love, and Roma, the goddess of Rome, both figures seated on a throne. The cellae were arranged symmetrically back-to-back. Roma's cella faced west, looking out over the Forum Romanum, and Venus's cella faced east, looking out over the Colosseum. A row of four columns (tetrastyle) lined the entrance to each cella, and the temple was bordered by colonnaded entrances ending in staircases that led down to the Colosseum. As an additional clever subtlety by Hadrian, Venus also represented love (Amor in Latin), and "AMOR" is "ROMA" spelled backwards. Thus, placing the two divinities of Venus and Rome back-to-back in a single temple created a further symmetry with the back-to-back symmetry of their names. Within Venus' cella was another altar where newly wed couples could make sacrifices. Directly adjacent to this altar stood gigantic silver statues of Marcus Aurelius and Faustina the Younger.

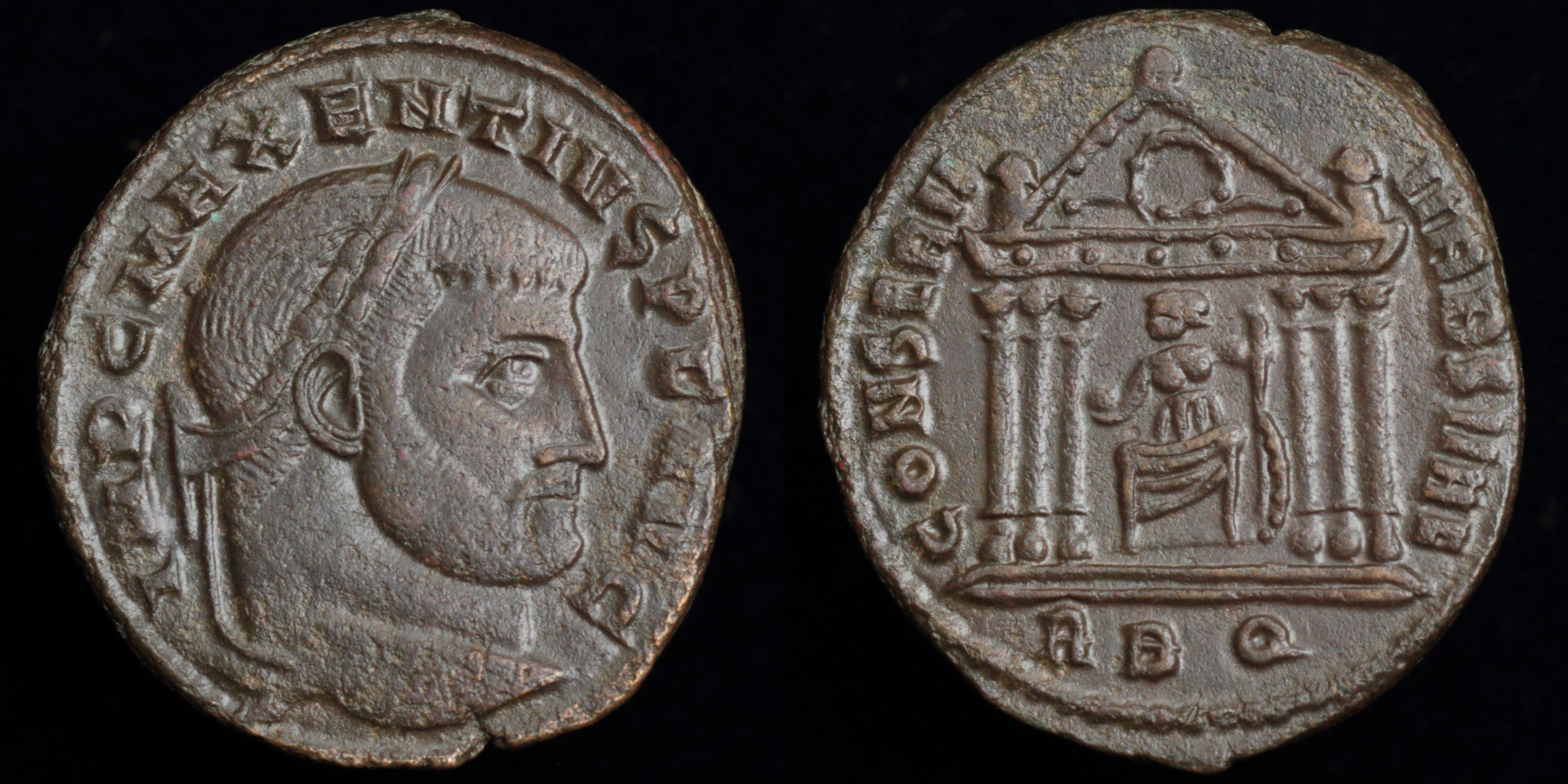
Bronze follis struck by Maxentius in Rome 308 - 310 AD. This coin is commemorating the reconstruction of the temple of Roma following the fire in 307 AD. Roma holding globe and sceptre seated within hexastyle temple with shield on the ground is depicted on the reverse.

The west and east sides of the temple (the short sides) had ten white marble columns (decastyle) while the south and north sides featured twenty columns. All of these columns measured 1.8 metres (5 ft 11 in) in width, making the temple very imposing.

Most of the remains are incorporated in the church of S. Francesca Romana. Due to the rebuilding by Maxentius, a coffered vaulted ceiling replaced the original wooden roof and the walls were doubled in thickness to take the increased load. The walls were inset with niches with small statues between small red porphyry columns standing above the floor on a plinth, all fronted by a colonnade in red porphyry.

== Contemporary Use ==
Since the papacy of John Paul II, the heights of the temple and its position opposite the main entrance to the Colosseum have been as a public address platform and event location. This may be seen in the photograph below, where a red canopy was erected to shelter the Pope as well as an illuminated cross, on the occasion of a Good Friday ceremony. The Pope, either personally or through a representative, leads the faithful through meditations on the stations of the cross while a cross is carried from there to the Colosseum.

The Temple has now been reopened to the public after an extensive restoration programme that lasted 26 years. Access to the temple is included in tickets for the Colosseum, the Forum, and the Palatine Hill. In 2007 the designer Valentino held his 45th anniversary celebrations with a large dinner party which included Mick Jagger. Dante Ferretti, the film set designer, recreated for the occasion the temple’s 40 classical columns with internal lighting.

In June 2026, the fifth Venere in Musica festival was held at the temple, featuring Tricky, Eliades Ochoa, Cabaret Voltaire, and others.

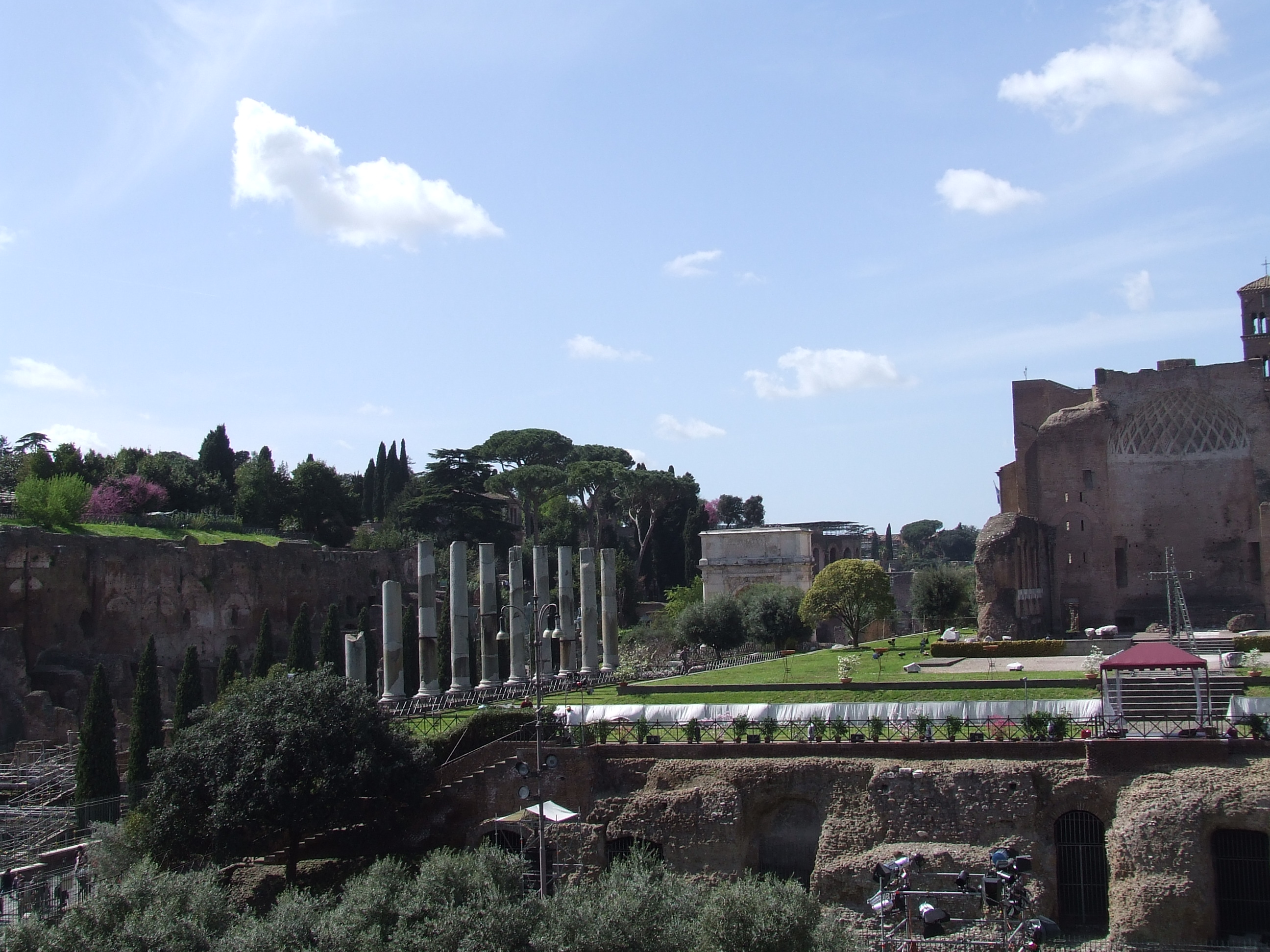
Canopy erected at the Temple of Venus and Rome during Good Friday ceremonies, 2010

Projections before Tricky's performance at the temple, June 2026.

== See also ==
- List of Ancient Roman temples
- List of ancient sites in Rome
