= Temple of Tellus =

Sanctuary in Ancient Rome

The Temple of Tellus was a sanctuary in Ancient Rome, erected after 268 BCE and dedicated to the goddess Tellus.

== History ==
The temple was founded by Publius Sempronius Sophus, following a vow he took when an earthquake occurred when he was commanding the Roman forces during a battle with the Picentes in 268 BCE. The site of the temple was in the Carinae district on the Esquiline Hill, and was reputedly built on the site where the house of Spurius Cassius Vecellinus once stood. The houses of Mark Antony and Cicero stood close to the temple, and Cicero restored the temple around 54 BCE after it had become run down, as he had gained possession of some land that had belonged to the temple.

The temple was occasionally used for meetings of the Senate, and on its walls was displayed a map or a personification of Italy (described by Varro as Italia picta). It was destroyed in the Great Fire of Rome in 64 CE, but was subsequently rebuilt. It was still listed in the Notitia as standing in the 4th century, located in the Regio IV Templum Pacis. If still in use by the 4th-century, it would have been closed during the persecution of pagans in the late Roman Empire.

The temple's dedication was celebrated on 13 December. As the worship of Tellus by the Romans had a very long history, it is probable that there was a much earlier cult centre on the site afterwards occupied by the temple.

== See also ==
- List of Ancient Roman temples
