= Murus Terreus =

Ancient Roman fortification

The Murus Terreus Carinarum is an obscure earthwork fortification of the ancient city of Rome known from a passage in the works of Varro. The Murus Terreus may have been a part of Rome's earliest fortifications, often referred to as the Servian Wall. While the location of the Murus Terreus remains unknown and debated, it is thought likely that it belonged to the fortifications of the Oppian Hill, thus placing it between the Carinae and the Subura. Pinza suggested that the works were located on the summit of the Oppian.
