= Imperial fora =

Series of monumental squares in Rome

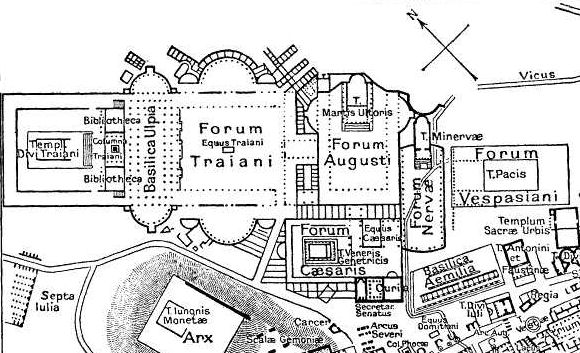
- Map of the imperial Fora

- Shown within Augustan Rome
- Interactive map of Imperial fora
- 41°53′40″N 12°29′08″E

The Imperial Fora (Fori Imperiali in Italian) are a series of monumental fora (public squares), constructed in Rome over a period of one and a half centuries, between 46 BC and 113 AD. The fora were the center of the Roman Republic and of the Roman Empire.

The Imperial Fora, while not part of the Roman Forum, are located relatively close to each other. Julius Caesar was the first to build in this section of Rome and rearranged both the Forum and the Comitium, another forum type space designated for politics, to do so. These fora were the centres of politics, religion and economy in the ancient Roman Empire.

During the early 20th century, Mussolini restored the Imperial Fora as part of his campaign to evoke and emulate the past glories of Ancient Rome, but he also built the Via dei Fori Imperiali across the middle of the site. The modern street and its heavy traffic has proved a source of damage to the buildings because of vibration and pollution. There have been a number of proposals to remove the road, but none have taken effect.

== Forum of Caesar ==
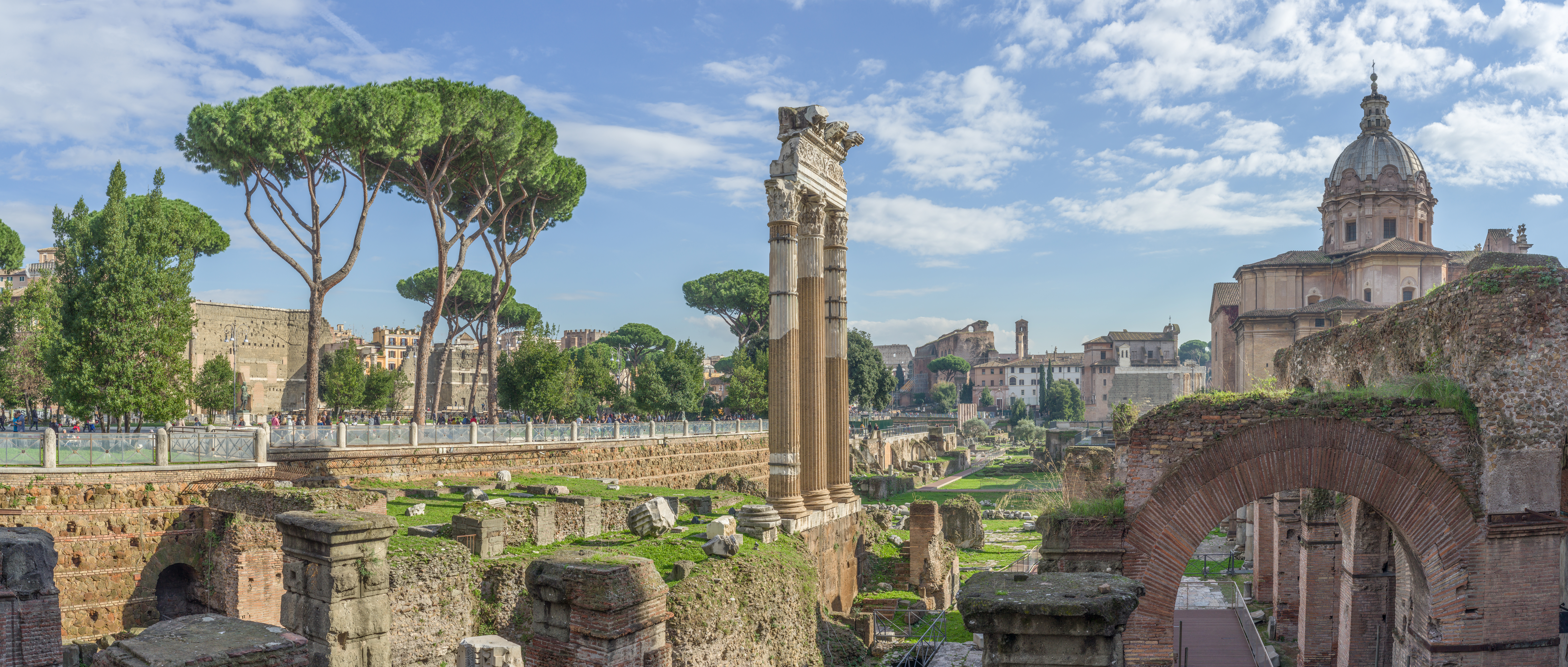
Forum of Caesar

Julius Caesar decided to construct a large forum bearing his name. This forum was inaugurated in 46 BC, although it was probably incomplete at this time and was finished later by Augustus.

The Forum of Caesar was constructed as an extension to the Roman Forum. The Forum was used as a replacement venue to the Roman Forum for public affairs as well as government; it was also designed as a celebration of Caesar's power. Caesar had placed, on the front of his forum, a temple devoted to Venus Genetrix, since Caesar's family (gens Julia) claimed to descend by Venus through Aeneas. A statue of Caesar himself riding Bucephalus, the celebrated horse of Alexander the Great, was placed in front of the temple, to symbolise absolute power. This centralised vision corresponded to the ideological function, following the propaganda of the Hellenistic sanctuaries; also the choice of the Forum site carried a meaning: the future dictator didn't want to be far from the central power, represented in the Curia, seat of the Senate. In fact, not long before Caesar's death, the Senate agreed to reconstruct the Curia on the site.

== Forum of Augustus ==
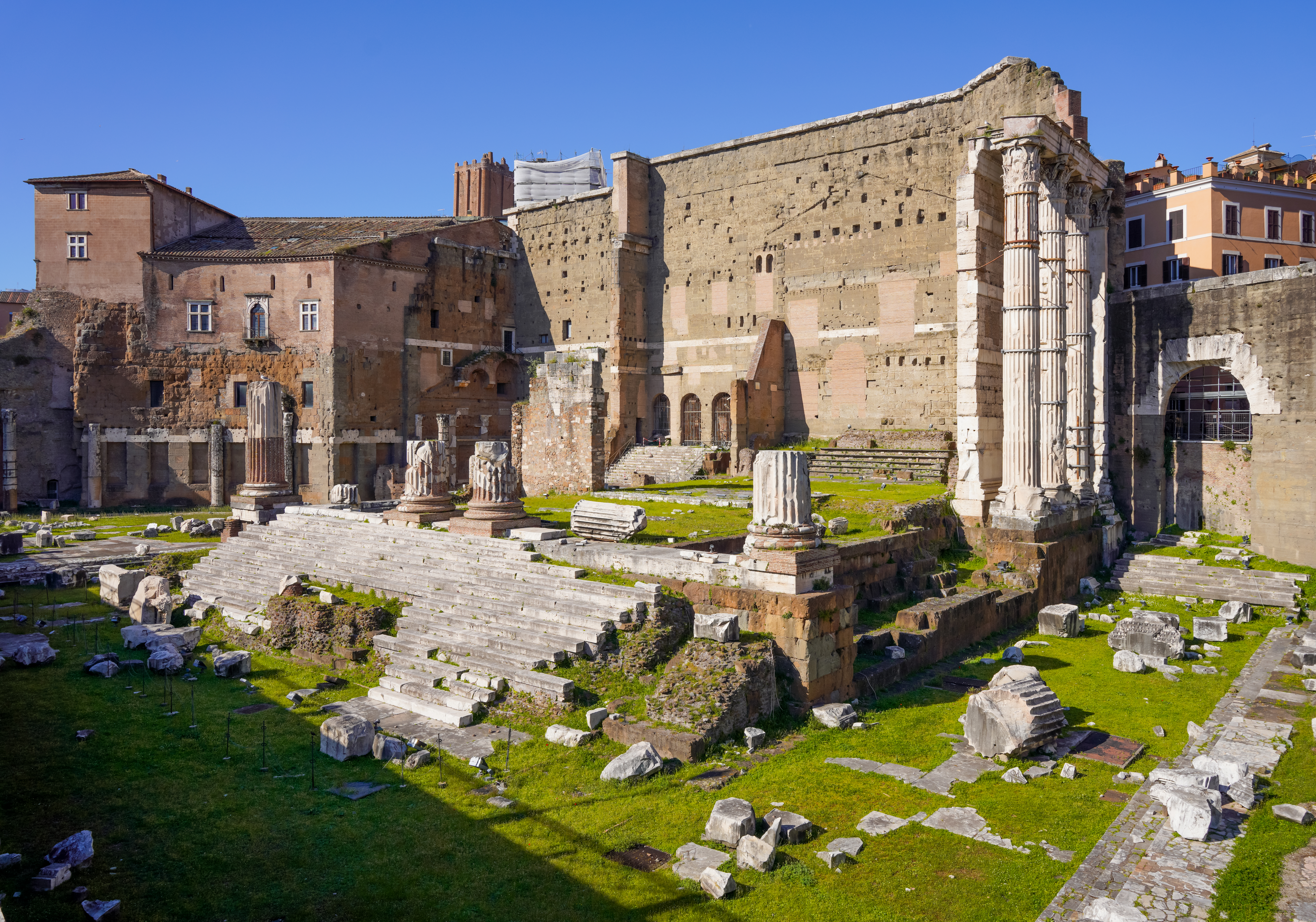
Forum of Augustus with the temple of Mars Ultor

In the battle of Philippi in 42 BC, in which Augustus and Mark Antony worked together and avenged Caesar's death, defeating the forces of Brutus and Cassius, Augustus vowed to build the Temple of Mars Ultor ("Mars the Avenger"). The incomplete forum was inaugurated, after 40 years of construction, in 2 BC, adding the second monumental square, the Forum of Augustus.

This new complex lies at right angles to the Forum of Caesar. The temple consists of a very tall wall, and this still distinguishes itself from the popular neighbourhood of Suburra. This high wall served as a firebreak, protecting the Forum area from the frequent conflagrations from which Rome suffered. The rectangular square has long deep porticos with a surface that widens into large semicircular exedras.

Recently one more slightly smaller exedra was found south on the wall bordering the Forum of Trajan, meaning that for the sake of symmetry there must have been other exedra demolished to make room for the forum of Nerva, rising the number to four and not two exedras. This completely changed the layout for the south part of the Forum of Augustus, meaning that it is much more similar to the Forum of Trajan and a new theory for this southern part of the forum suggests that in fact there was a basilica between the two new exedras (like in the Forum of Trajan). This supports the numerous ancient authors that tell us the forum was used as a court of law.

The entire decoration of the Forum was tightly connected to the ideology of Augustus. According to myth, Rome herself was born from the god Mars through Romulus. This forum was occupied by . . .

== Temple of Peace ==
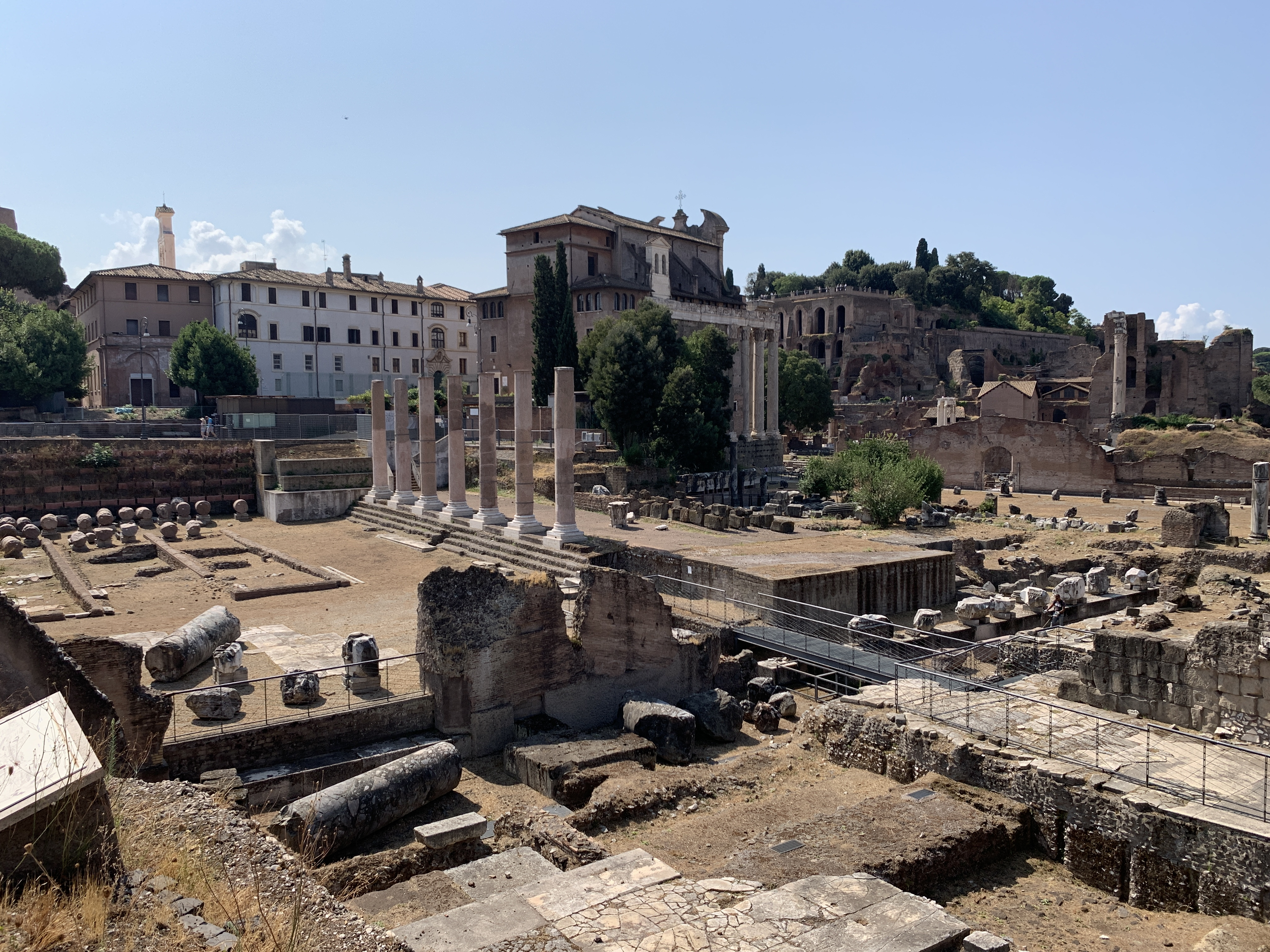
The Temple of Peace

In 75 AD, the Temple of Peace, also known as the Forum of Vespasian, was built under Emperor Vespasian. Separated from the Forum of Augustus and the Forum of Caesar by the Argiletum, which connected the Roman Forum to the Subura, the temple faced the Velian Hill (in the direction of the Colosseum). The fact that this structure is not mentioned as having a civil function has prevented it from being classified as a true Forum. Therefore, the structure was simply identified as the Temple of Peace (Templum Pacis) until the late Empire.

The shape of the square was also different: the temple was constructed as a large apsidal hall that opened up like an exedra at the bottom of the portico. A row of columns distinguished the portico from the temple. The central area was not paved like other fora and served as a garden, with pools and pedestals for statues, so that it was similar to an open-air museum.

The monument was built to celebrate the conquest of Jerusalem. One of the chambers opened at the end of the porticos housed the Forma Urbis Romae, a marble map of ancient Rome, made in the Severan period (3rd century) by drawing on the marble slab that covered the wall. The wall is now part of the façade of the church of Santi Cosma e Damiano, where the holes used to mount the slabs of the map can still be seen. The Temple of Peace is also said to have housed the Menorah from Herod's Temple.

== Forum of Nerva, or the Transitional Forum ==
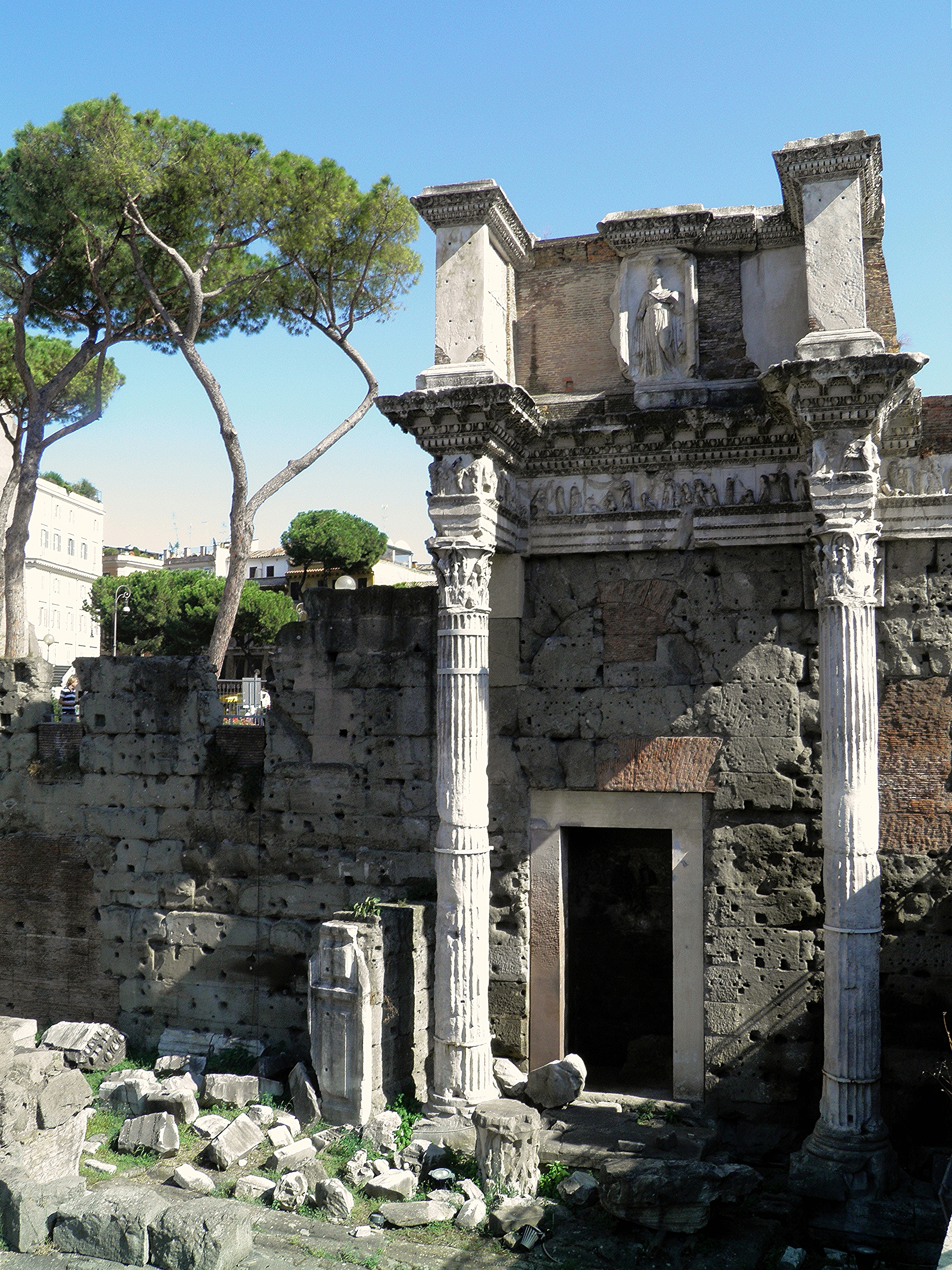
The so-called "Colonnacce": remains of the peristyle which defined the Forum of Nerva

Domitian decided to unify the previous complex and the free remaining irregular area, between the Temple of Peace and the Fora of Caesar and Augustus, and build another monumental forum which connected all of the other fora.

The limited space, partially occupied by one of the exedrae of the Forum of Augustus and by the via dell'Argileto, obliged Domitian to build the lateral porticos as simply decorations of the bounding walls of the forum. The temple, dedicated to Minerva as protector of the emperor, was built leaning on the exedra of the Forum of Augustus, so that the remaining space became a large monumental entrance (Porticus Absidatus) for all the fora.

Because of the death of Domitian, the forum was inaugurated by his successor, Nerva, who gave his own name to it. The Forum of Nerva is also known as Transitional Forum, because it worked as an access way, just like via dell'Argileto had done.

== Forum of Trajan ==
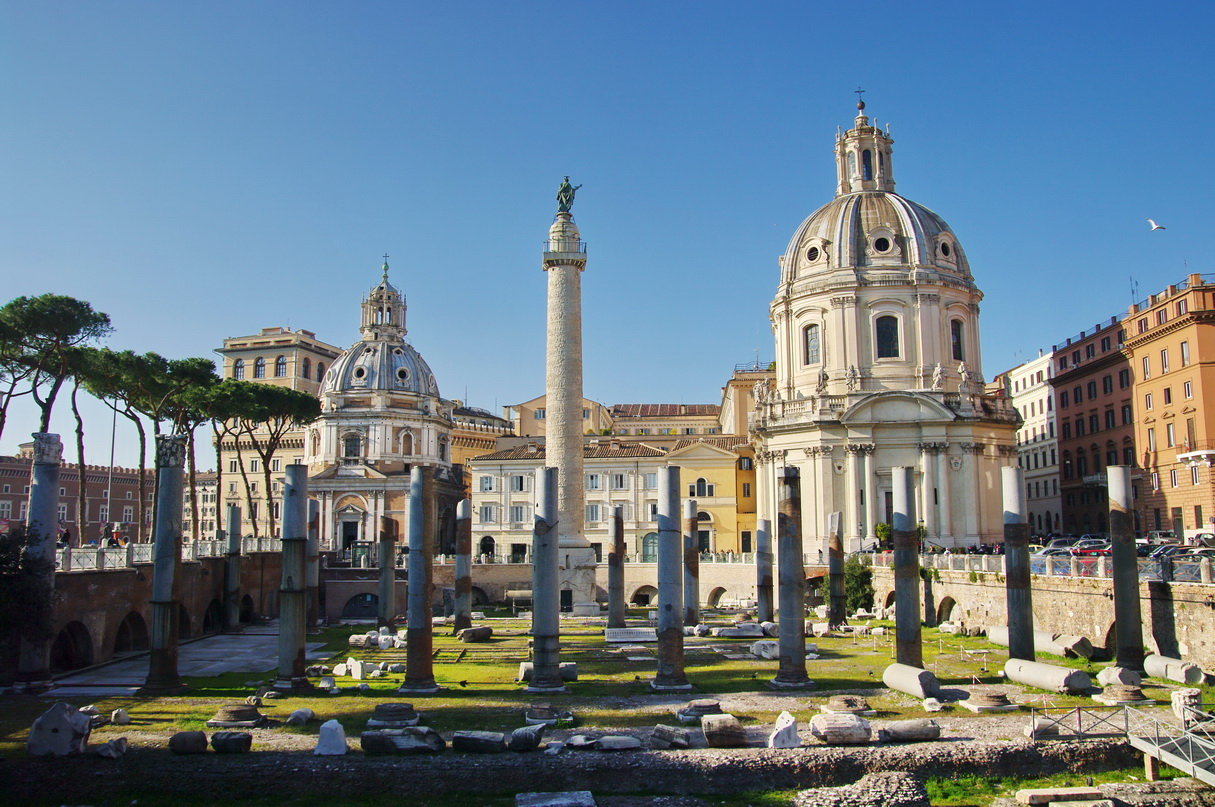
Forum of Trajan

It is probable that Domitian's projects were more ambitious than the building of the small Forum of Nerva and probably under his reign they started to remove the small saddle that united the Capitoline Hill to the Quirinal Hill, thus blocking the Fora towards Campus Martius, near to modern Piazza Venezia.

The project was resumed by Trajan with the construction of Trajan's Forum between 112 and 113. The occasion was the conquest of Dacia, whose spoils paid for this celebration of the military conquests of Rome.

The preparation of the Forum required a lot of work. It was necessary to remove the hilly saddle, and to support the cut of Quirinal Hill through the building of Trajan's market. The Forum square was closed by the Basilica Ulpia, with Trajan's Column at its back. In front of the basilica, a monumental façade was the background of a large, equestrian sculpture of the Emperor. The last Forum was also the biggest and greatest.

== Museum ==
In 2007, a museum dedicated to the Imperial Fora was opened in the Trajan's Market, which once constituted the northern edge of the Forum of Trajan. The new museum, named "Museo dei Fori Imperiali" (English: Museum of Imperial Fora) by the means of sculptures, videos, architectural pieces, and scale models depicts the history of the four fora and the Temple of Peace.

Preceded by Roman Forum	Landmarks of Rome; Imperial fora	Succeeded by Forum of Augustus
