= Alta Semita =

Street in ancient Rome

The Alta Semita ("High Path") was a street in ancient Rome that gave its name to one of the 14 regions of Augustan Rome.

The Alta Semita brought traffic into Rome from the salt route (Via Salaria) that had existed since prehistoric times. The great antiquity of the street is also suggested by semita, a Latin word usually meaning "footpath" and not used for any other Roman street. It ran most likely along the modern Via del Quirinale and Via Venti Settembre, on the spine of the Quirinal Hill, creating a straight route southwest from the Porta Collina in the Servian Wall to a major temple from the Hadrianic era on the Collis Salutaris. It probably connected to the Vicus Iugarius.

It may also be that the street called Alta Semita in the Roman Republic was not the same as the one known in the later Empire.

The regional catalogues name Regio VI as Alta Semita, after the street. The temple of the Flavian family (Templum Gentis Flaviae) was located in Alta Semita, according to the regional catalogue.
