= San Lorenzo in Fonte =

Church in Rome

- Chiesa dei Santi Ippolito e Lorenzo in Fonte
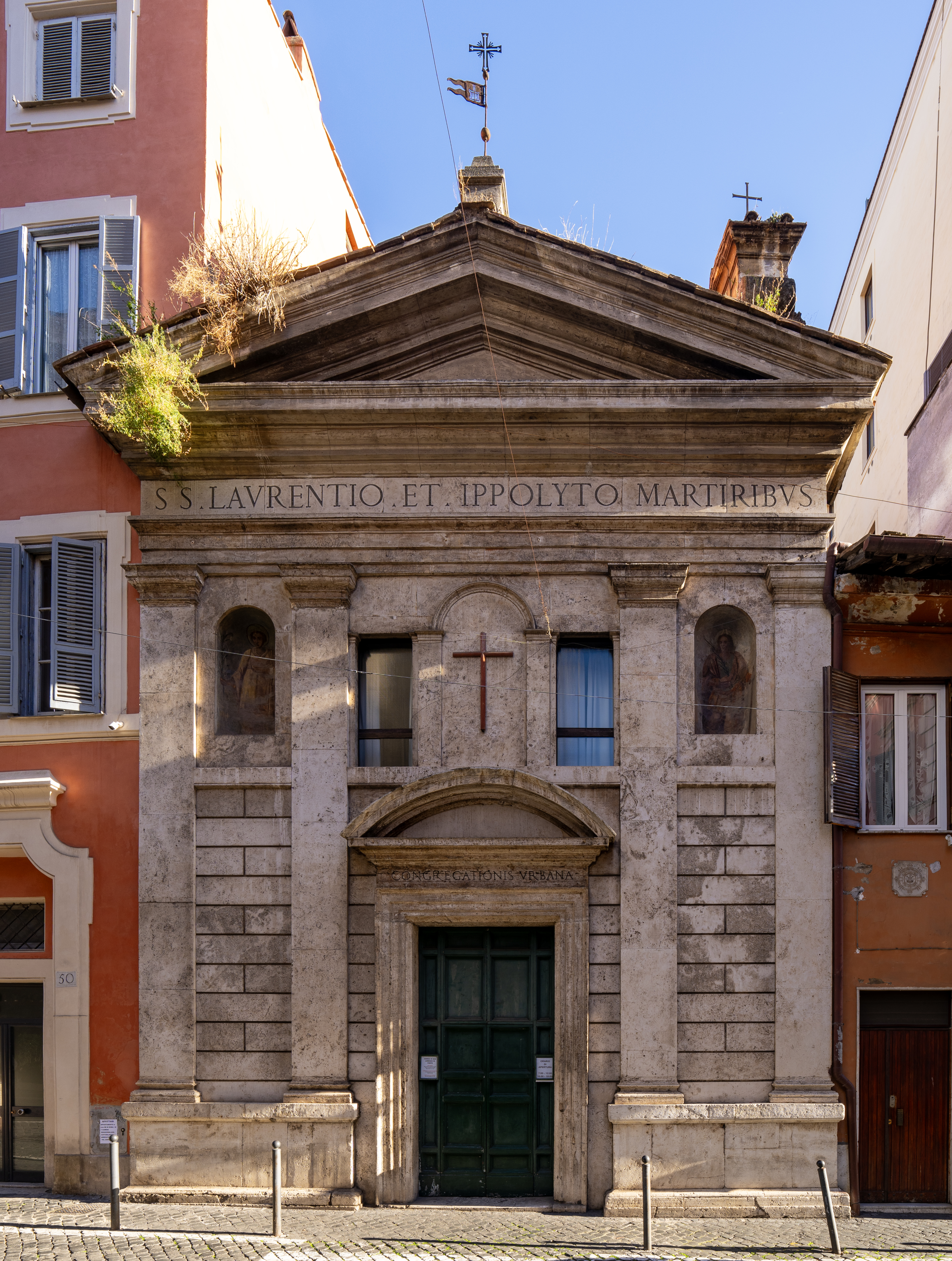
- San Lorenzo in Fonte from Via de' Ciancaleoni.
- San Lorenzo in Fonte
- 41°53′44.0″N 12°29′37.0″E
- Location: Via Urbana 50 - 00184 Rome
- Country: Italy
- Denomination: Catholic
- Tradition: Roman Rite

History
- Dedication: St. Hippolytus and St. Lawrence

Architecture
- Architect: Domenico Castelli
- Style: Baroque
- Groundbreaking: 4th century
- Completed: 1656

Administration
- Diocese: Rome

Santi Ippolito e Lorenzo in Fonte, better known as San Lorenzo in Fonte, is a Catholic church in Rome (Italy), Rione Monti, on Via Urbana.

== History ==
The church is dedicated to the holy martyrs Hippolytus and Lawrence. According to tradition, it was built on the house of the centurion Hippolytus, where the deacon Lawrence was held prisoner. Lawrence miraculously sprung a source of water, still visible in the basement of the building, with which he baptized his cellmate Lucillus, restoring his sight at the same time; in the face of the miracle, Hippolytus would have converted to Christianity and was being baptized in turn.

The origin of the church is unknown. Sometimes it is confused with another one, no longer extant, called Memoria Sancti Hippoliti, already mentioned in 4th century, whose title was joined to the current one.
The church is mentioned for the first time in a document preserved in the Archive of Santa Maria Maggiore and dated May 28, 1348; in 13th and 14th century it was inhabited by Benedictine monks and nuns.

The present church was built in 1543 by commission of the Spanish cardinal Juan Álvarez de Toledo. In 1624, Pope Urban VIII had enlargement works carried out by the architect Domenico Castelli, called il Fontanino, a nephew of Carlo Maderno.

== Description ==
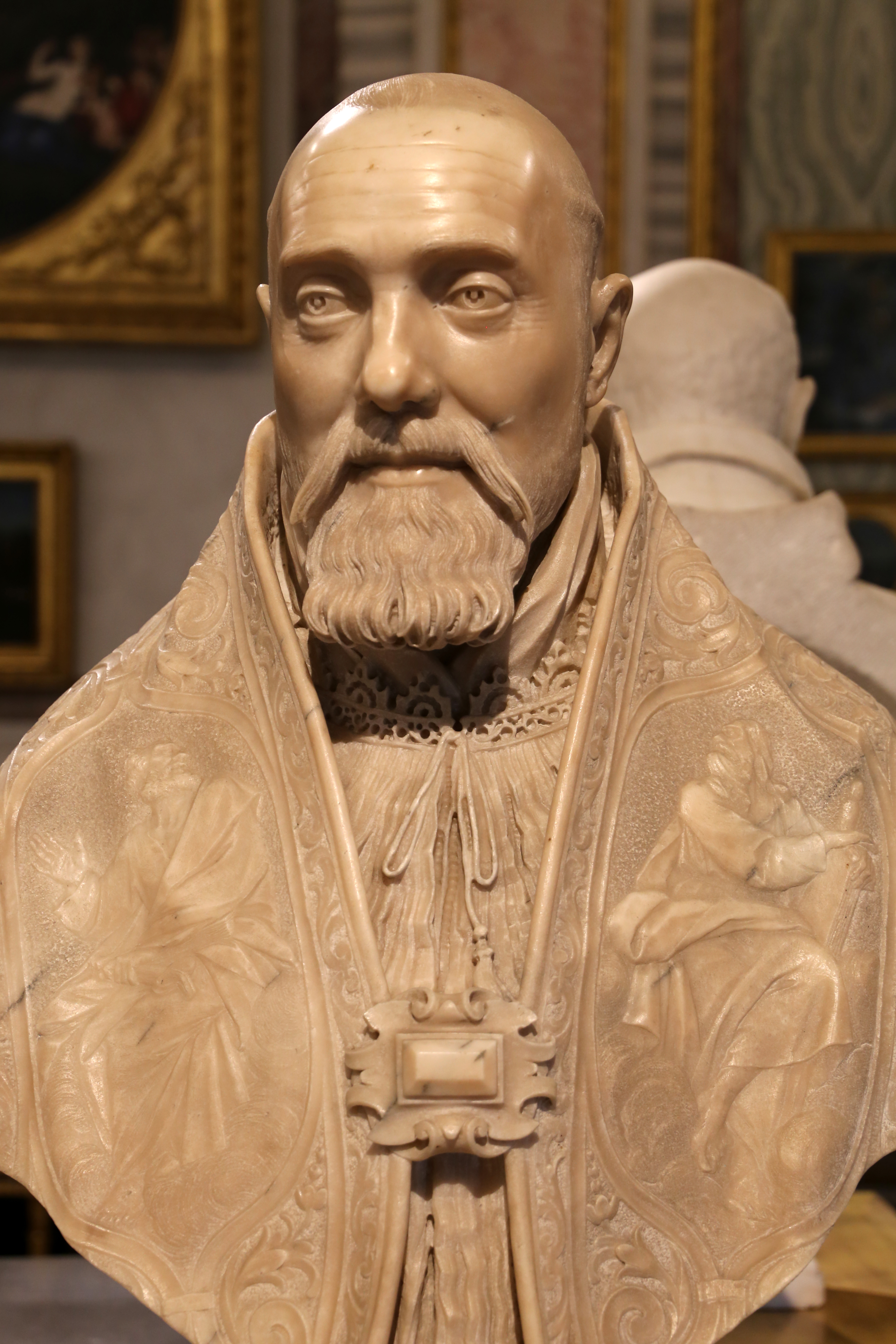
Bust of Pope Urban VIII (attributed to Gian Lorenzo Bernini).

The works of art preserved in the church include:

- on the main altar, Baptism of St. Hippolytus attributed to Giovanni Battista Speranza, also author of the two side paintings, Martyrdom of St. Lawrence and St. Lawrence distributing the loaves to poor;
- the Martyrdom of Sts. John and Paul by an anonymous artist of the seventeenth century;
- the bust of Pope Urban VIII attributed to Bernini or to his school.

The church houses the tomb of the famous Ticinese architect Carlo Fontana, Bernini's favorite pupil and assistant.

The most attractive part of the visit to the church is the descent into the underground environments - which are accessed through a long and narrow staircase - housing the ancient prison of St. Lawrence and the source of water with which Lucillus was baptized. The arch, which divides the first section of the corridor from the former Roman part, shows a bas-relief depicting Christ rising from the tomb, dating back to the 16th century. The water well is embellished with a 17th-century bas-relief which depicts Lawrence baptizing Lucillus.

== Bibliography ==
- M. Armellini, Le chiese di Roma dal secolo IV al XIX, Rome 1891, p. 224
- C. Hulsen (1927). "Le chiese di Roma nel Medio Evo". Florence.
- F. Titi (1763). "Descrizione delle Pitture, Sculture e Architetture esposte in Roma". Rome.
- Claudio Rendina (2000). Le Chiese di Roma. Rome: Newton & Compton Editori. p. 175. ISBN 978-88-541-1833-1.
- A. Manodori, Rione I Monti, in AA.VV, I rioni di Roma, Newton & Compton Editori, Rome 2000, Vol. I, pp. 36–130.

== See also ==
- Saint Lawrence
- Carlo Fontana
