= Carinae =

Area of ancient Rome

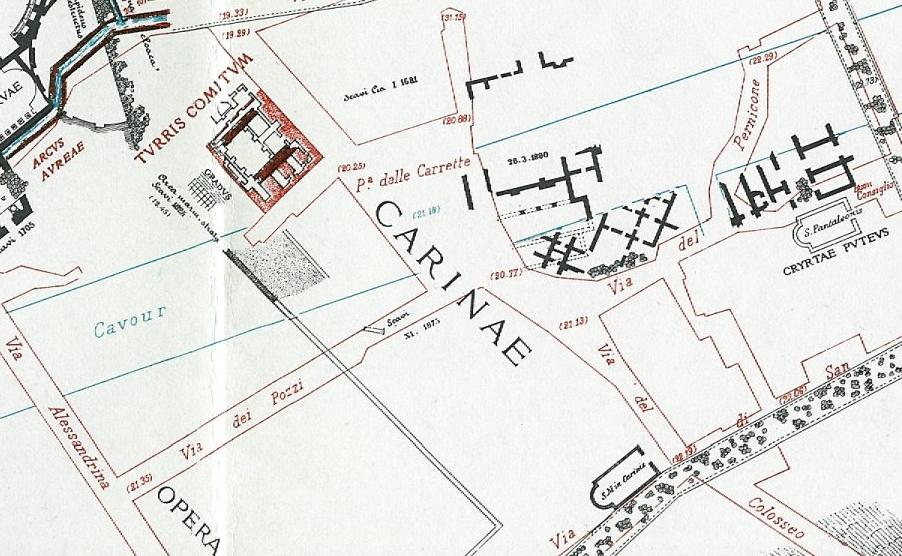
- A portion of map of Rome by Rodolfo Lanciani showing the location of Carinae (between 1893 and 1901).
- Interactive map of Carinae
- Type: Urban neighborhood
- Cultures: Ancient Rome
- Location: Rome, Italy

Carinae was an area of ancient Rome. It was one of its most exclusive neighborhoods, where many of the senatorial class lived.
Florus described the Carinae as the "most celebrated part of the city" (celeberrima pars urbis).

== Description ==
The Carinae occupied the western end of the southern spur of the Esquiline Hill in Rome. The district likely incorporated the earlier Fagutal, with the northern tip of the Oppian Hill on its western side; it extended between the Velian Hill and the Clivus Pullius. Its outlook was southwestern, across the swamps of the Palus Ceroliae toward the Aventine.

The slopes of the neighborhood near the Velia were crossed by the vicus Cyprius, where, according to a Roman tradition taken up by Livy, Tullia would have killed her father Servius Tullius, overwhelming him with her chariot pulled by horses. The same passage from Livy indicates the existence of a temple dedicated to Diana in the Carinae.

The Murus Terreus also crossed the Carinae.

The district housed the residences of Marcus Tullius Cicero and Gnaeus Pompeius, whose house was later owned by Mark Antony and then became a possession of the imperial state property (Emperor Tiberius lived there for some time).

== Etymology ==
According to Servius, the name of the district comes from the fact that certain buildings rising close to the Temple of Tellus represented the keels (carinae in Latin) of ships.
