= Clivus Suburanus =

Street in ancient Rome

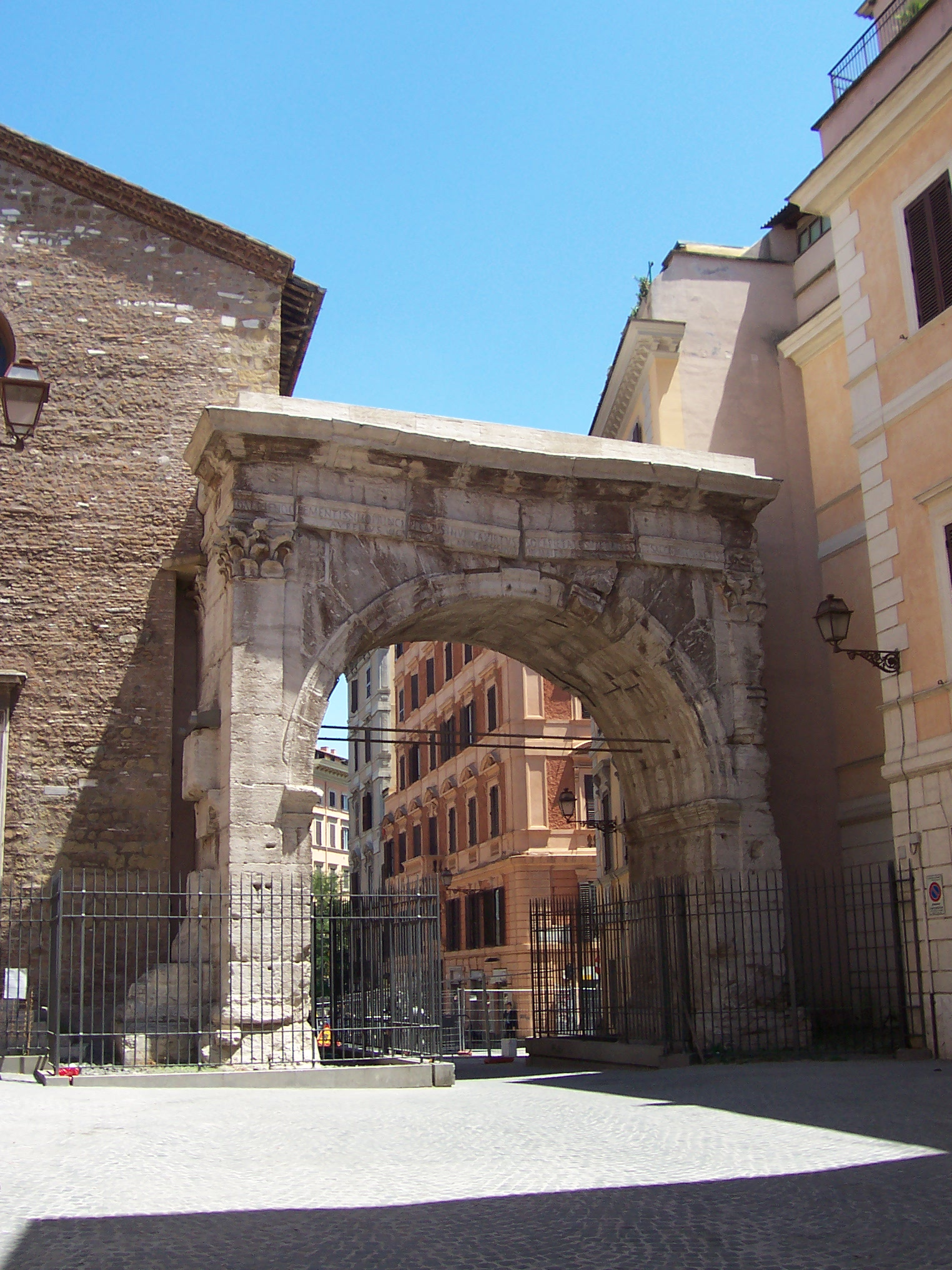
The Porta Esquilina, where the clivus Suburanus joins the Servian Wall.

The Clivus Suburanus was a street in ancient Rome. It was an irregular continuation from the Subura valley, rising between the Oppian Hill and the Cispian Hill as far as the Porta Esquilina on the Servian Wall The remains of its paving suggest it ran along the route of the present-day via di Santa Lucia in Selci, via di San Martino and via di S. Vito.

== Bibliography ==
- Samuel Ball Platner, "Cliva", A Topographical Dictionary of Ancient Rome, Oxford University Press, 1929, p. 125.
