= Via Alessandrina =

Street in Rome, Italy

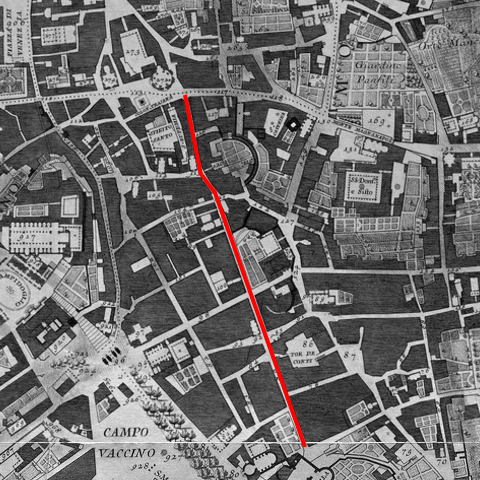
- Via Alessandrina (marked in red), a detail from the map La Nuova Topografia di Roma by Giambattista Nolli (1748).
- Interactive map of Via Alessandrina
- Namesake: Cardinal Michele Bonelli, called Alessandrino
- Length: 300 m (980 ft)
- Location: Rome, Italy
- Arrondissement: Municipio Roma I
- Quarter: R. I Monti
- Postal code: 00187
- Nearest metro station: Colosseo
- From: Trajan's Forum
- To: Via dei Fori Imperiali

Construction
- Completion: 1570
- Demolished: 1924–1932 (partially)

Other
- Known for: Trajan's Forum; Forum of Augustus; Forum of Nerva

Via Alessandrina is an urban street in Rome (Italy), at the southern end of the Rione Monti, passing alongside the ruins of the Imperial Fora.

It was originally the main road axis of the former Alessandrino district, built in the second half of the 16th century by Cardinal Michele Bonelli, a nephew of Pope Pius V born in Alessandria (Piedmont), hence the name of both the district and the street. Traced around 1570, the street was 400 metres (1,300 ft) long and connected the urbanized area of the Trajan's Forum with the Basilica of Maxentius.

The Alessandrino district was completely demolished in the 1930s to make way for Via dell'Impero, now Via dei Fori Imperiali: Via Alessandrina is its only surviving witness and, although decontextualized, has become a pedestrian walkway allowing a suggestive point of view on the archaeological remains.

== The Middle Ages ==
The area of the Fora was never completely abandoned, even in the centuries of decadence: the structures of the ancient edifices were partly rebuilt and reused, partly demolished in order to convert what was once the center of imperial Rome into agricultural land.

Excavations carried out in the area of the Fora since 1998 have in fact brought to light building layers due to collapse or abandonment, dating between 6th and 7th century, as well as the remains of aristocratic houses dating between 9th and 10th century in the Forum of Nerva, which are among the very few traces of Carolingian buildings in Rome. However the area – a plain at the foot of the Quirinal, Viminal and Oppian hills – came back to be swampy due to the decommissioning of the Roman sewage system, so much so that it was popularly called li Pantani (Romanesco for "the Quagmires").

== The birth of the district ==
The first modern urban planning in the area between the Forum of Nerva and the Trajan's Column took place around 1570 thanks to Cardinal Michele Bonelli. He arranged to reclaim the area and make it buildable and traced the street, called Alessandrina from his nickname. The street cut through the ancient Argiletum reaching the Temple of Peace (beyond today's Via Cavour).

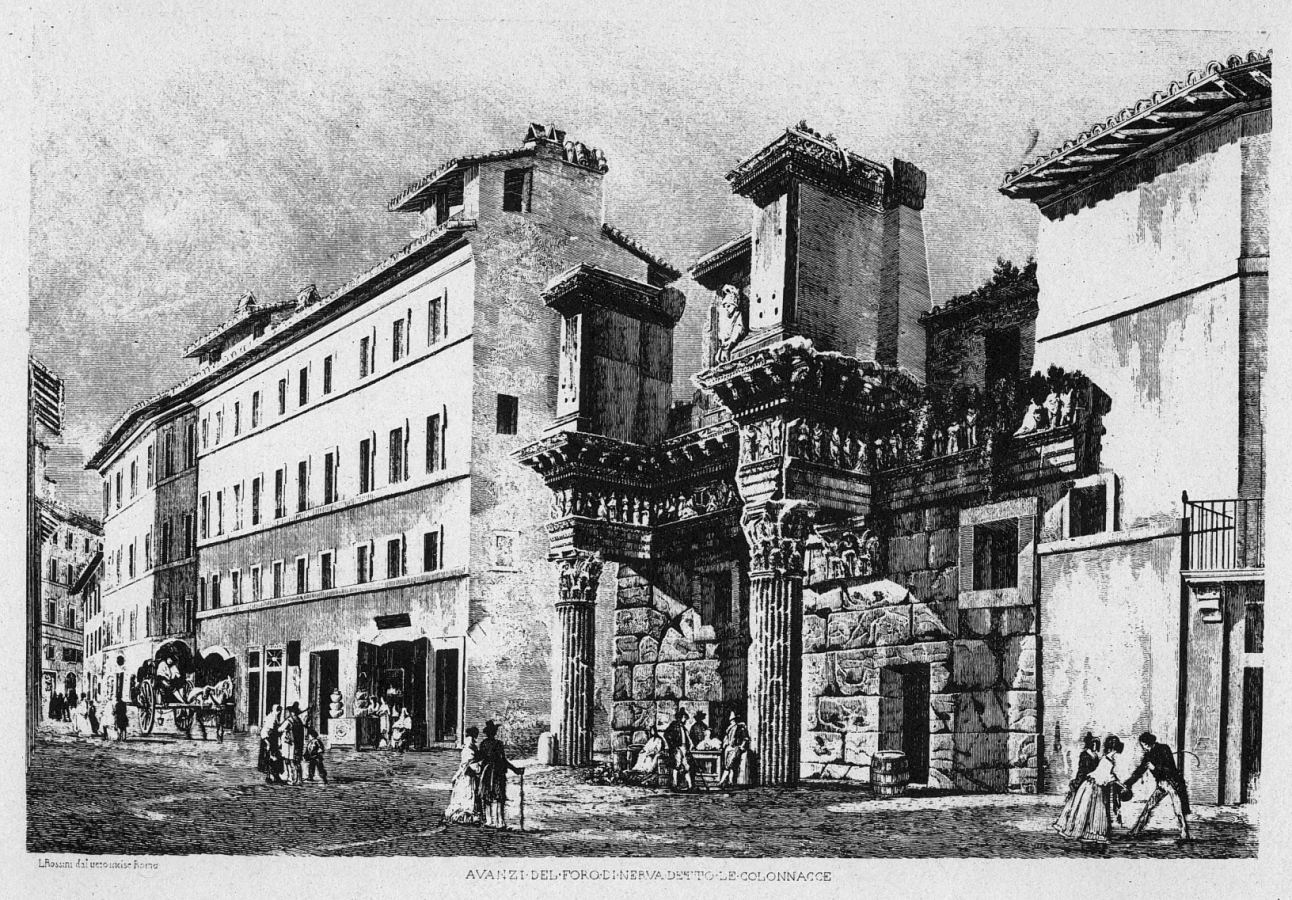
The Forum of Nerva with the remains of the Temple of Minerva (the Colonnacce) in an engraving by Luigi Rossini (19th century).

The small, narrow streets of the district (Via Cremona, marking its border towards the Capitolium; Via Bonella, Via del Priorato, Via dei Carbonari, Piazza delle Chiavi d'Oro) formed the mesh of the building fabric that had grown continuously between the slopes of the Capitolium, the wall of Suburra and the Roman Forum. It consisted of modest houses, but also of prestigious buildings, such as the small palace of Sixtus IV (maybe the Ghislieri Palace), the Conservatory of Santa Eufemia, born as a convent of the Sperse di Sant'Eufemia next to a church dedicated to St. Urban and the palace of Flaminio Ponzio. The ground floors housed small businesses and artisan shops and in 1855 four taverns overlooked Via Alessandrina: one of them, called alle Colonnacce, stood among the remains of the Temple of Minerva.

== The 20th-century demolition ==
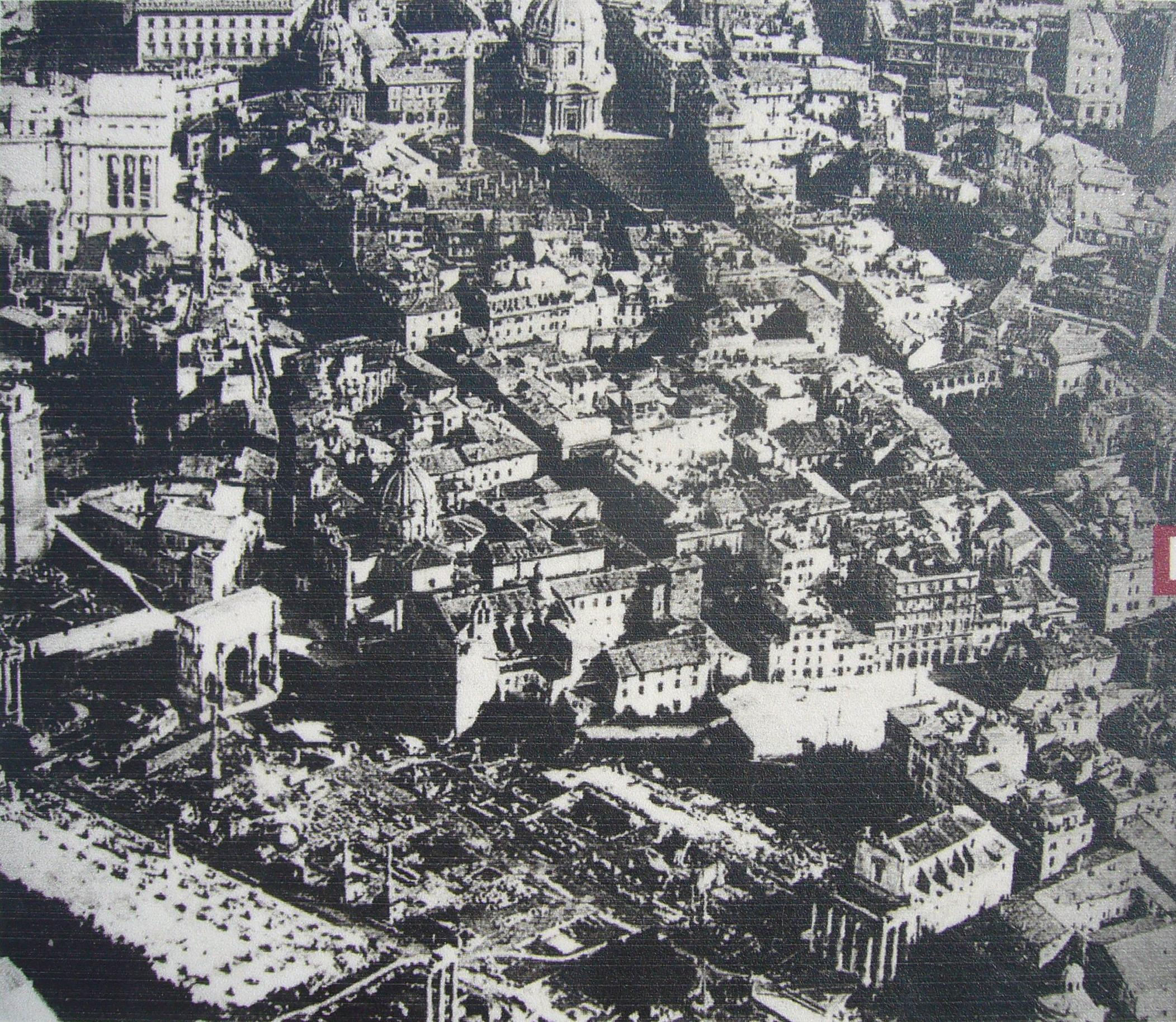
The Roman Forum and the Alessandrino district before the demolitions (between 1924 and 1932): the Ghettarello above the Forum of Caesar has already been demolished, while the other buildings are still intact.

The district had therefore a significant life, history and memories; nevertheless, it occupied an area which boasted extraordinary archaeological sites and for this reason had been at the center of what the environmentalist Antonio Cederna called «the eternal tendency to dismantle that took hold soon after the unification of Italy» and that the new positivist Italy shared with other European capitals and large cities.

The first master plan of Rome after its annexation to Italy, dated 1873, already provided for the enlargement of Via Cremona (the parallel of Via Alessandrina under the Capitolium, which crossed the Forum of Caesar) towards Via Cavour, as well as the construction of an overhead viaduct which should have extended the same Via Cavour and passed over the Roman Forum, towards Piazza Bocca della Verità and Trastevere. However, the building of the gigantic mass of the Vittoriano – which took place between 1900 and 1911 outside of any planning, as happened for decades in Rome – shifted the focus of urban planners from the Forums to Piazza Venezia.

Then it began to be considered essential to create a straight road that would connect the new modern monumental center with the ancient one, identified with the Colosseum. The first demolitions – aimed precisely at making room for the Vittoriano – took place in the first decade of the 20th century between Piazza Venezia and the north slope of the Capitolium: they almost completely destroyed, among other things, the medieval complex of the convent of Aracoeli and the Tower of Paul III on the Capitolium.

According to this logic – which mixed functional ambitions (to speed up traffic, it was hypothesized the construction of a tram subway under the Capitoline Hill) and rhetorical exaltation of the memories of imperial Rome – a new variant to the master plan was approved in 1926, providing for the complete demolition of what had been built over the centuries above the Forums between Piazza Venezia and Via Cavour, as stated by Mussolini in 1925: «Millennial monuments must tower in the necessary solitude».

The demolition was thus approved in 1931 and carried out in just one year, involving the entire space between Piazza Venezia and the Colosseum: to build the 900 metres (3,000 ft) of what was later called Via dell'Impero, 300,000 square metres (3,200,000 sq ft) of soil and concrete were removed and spilled a few kilometers away to fill «the once malarial lowlands of Via Ostiensis», without any survey being made of what was being destroyed. Upon completion of the work, about 5,000 living spaces had been demolished and about 4,000 people transferred from their houses under the Capitolium to the new borgate, then deep in the countryside.

The last building block was demolished in 1933; the works were delayed due to the legal affairs resulting from the discovery of a large quantity of coins and jewels, the so-called treasure of via Alessandrina (now in the Capitoline Museums), found on 22 February of that year in a wall of an apartment at number 101 of the street and belonged to Francesco Martinetti, a well-known antiquarian who died about forty years earlier.

== Recent history ==
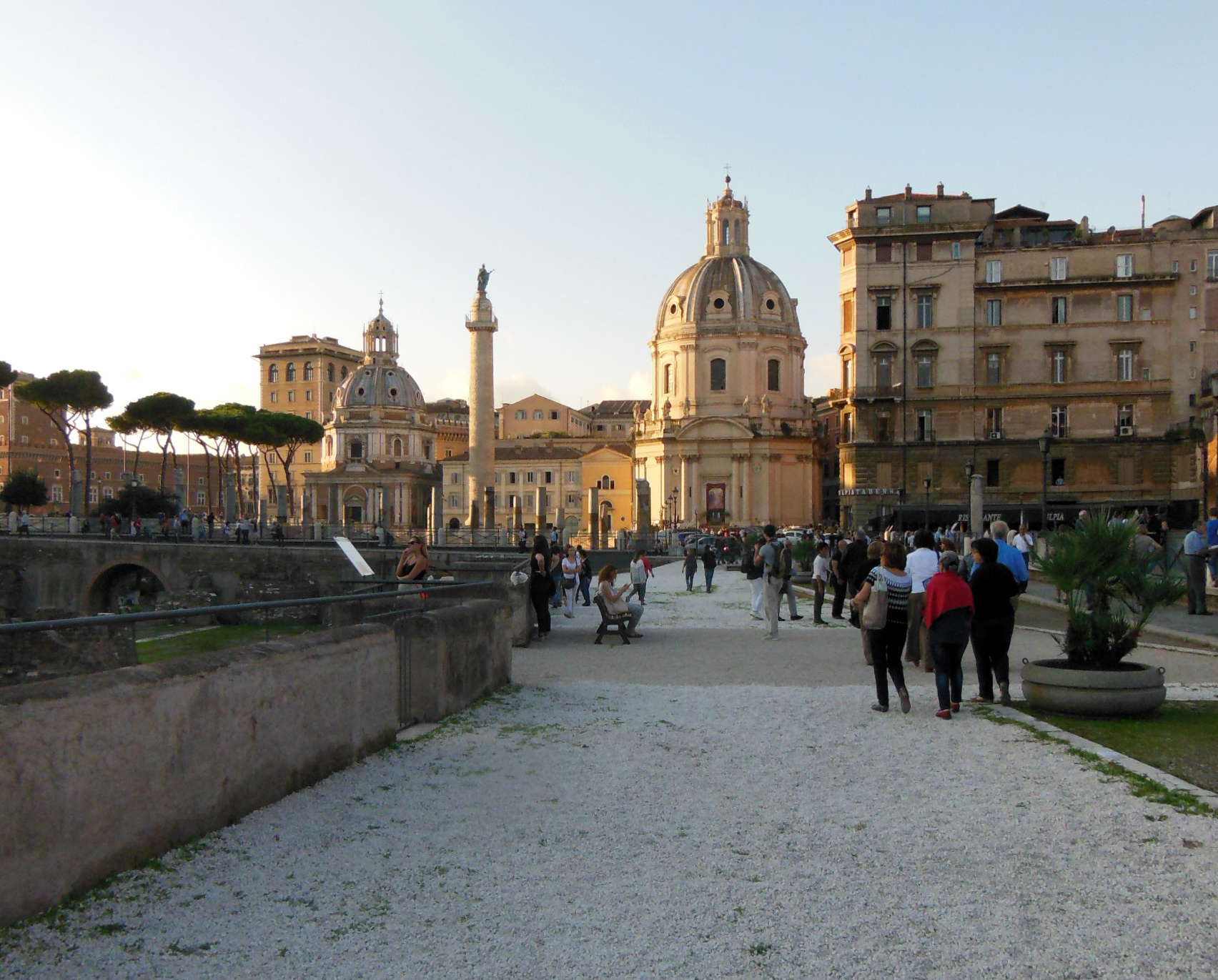
Via Alessandrina after its reopening to the public on 28 October 2013.

After the urban interventions of the Fascist period, the street survived as it currently appears, cutting across Via dei Fori Imperiali and isolated from its original context. It was closed for transit in 1999, in forecast of archaeological excavations which never took place, and reopened 14 years later on 28 October 2013.

The street was actually affected by excavations between March 2018 and December 2020: the initial stretch, about 50 metres (160 ft) long, was dismantled to reconnect the two areas of the Trajan's Forum that the archaeological investigations of 1998–2000 had isolated.
During the excavations, remains of ancient sculptures were uncovered: the face of a divinity identified with Dionysus, then a bust which probably belonged to the about 70 statues of Dacian warriors that decorated the attic of the Trajan's Forum, finally a colossal portrait of Augustus, all of which are now on display in the nearby Museum of Imperial Fora in the Trajan's Market. The works ended on 11 December 2020.

== Bibliography ==
- Bruno Toscano, La città Assente: La via Alessandrina ai fori imperiali, Agorà 2007
- Antonio Cederna, Lo sfondamento di via dell'Impero, from Mussolini urbanista, Bari, Laterza, 1979 (cited in Italo Insolera, Roma fascista nelle fotografie dell'Istituto Luce, Editori Riuniti 2002)
- Roberto Meneghini, L'origine di un quartiere altomedievale romano attraverso i recenti scavi del Foro di Traiano

== See also ==
- Argiletum
- Casa dei Cavalieri di Rodi
- Imperial fora
- Forum of Nerva
- Trajan's Market
