= Palazzetto Venezia (Rome) =

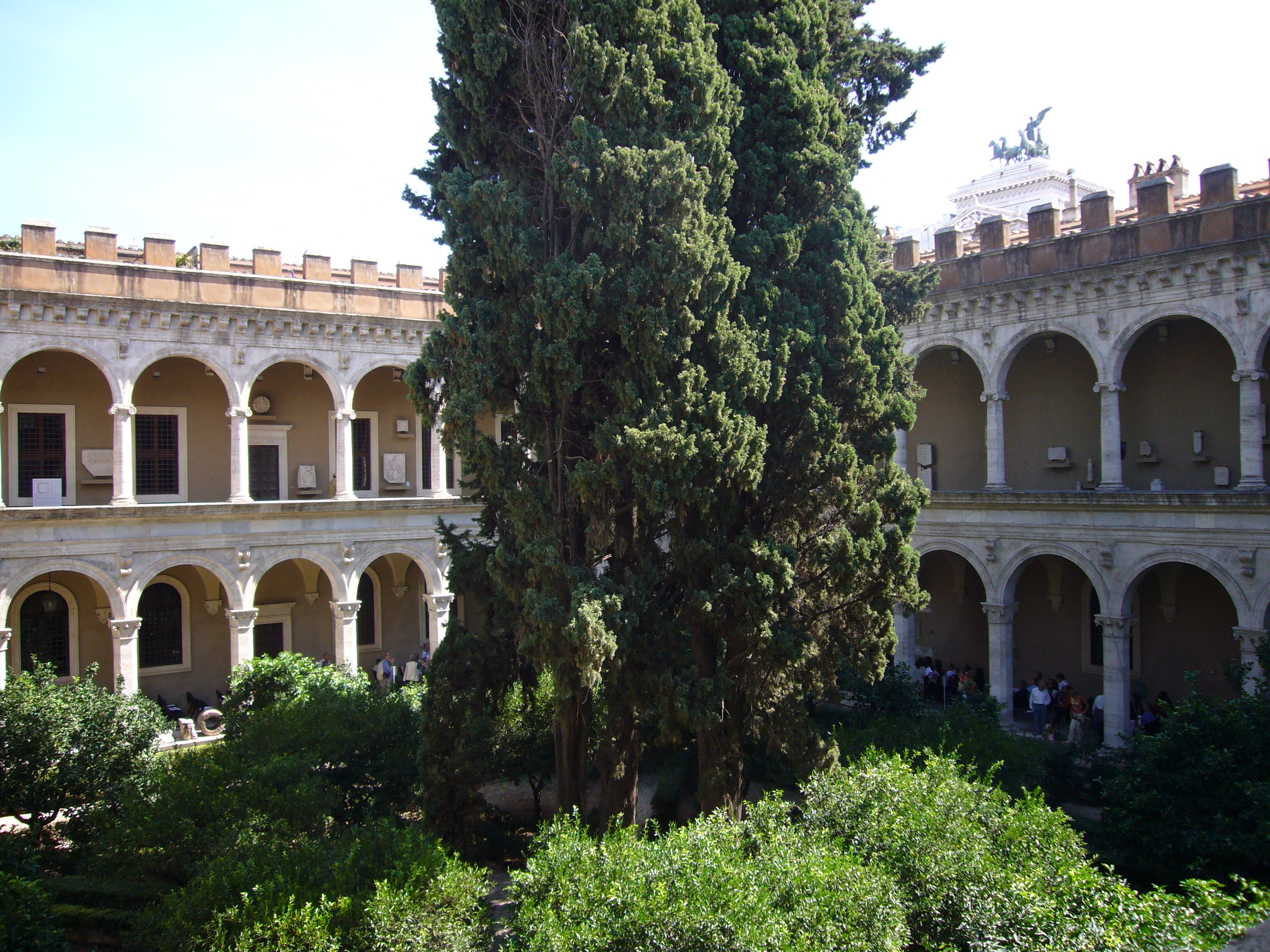
- Inner courtyard of the Palazzetto Venezia
- Interactive map of the Palazzetto Venezia area

General information
- Architectural style: Renaissance
- Location: Via del Plebiscito 118, Rome, Italy
- Coordinates: 41°53′43.5″N 12°28′51.6″E

Palazzetto Venezia (formerly Palazzetto di San Marco) is a Renaissance palace situated on one side of Piazza Venezia, in the historic center of Rome, Italy.

The building went through several alterations over the centuries until 1909, when it was demolished, and a slightly modified version was rebuilt a short distance from its original position to allow the enlargement of Piazza Venezia as part of the construction of the Vittoriano.

Since 2006, the building has been part of the Museum of Palazzo Venezia and its upper loggia houses the museum's lapidarium.

== History ==
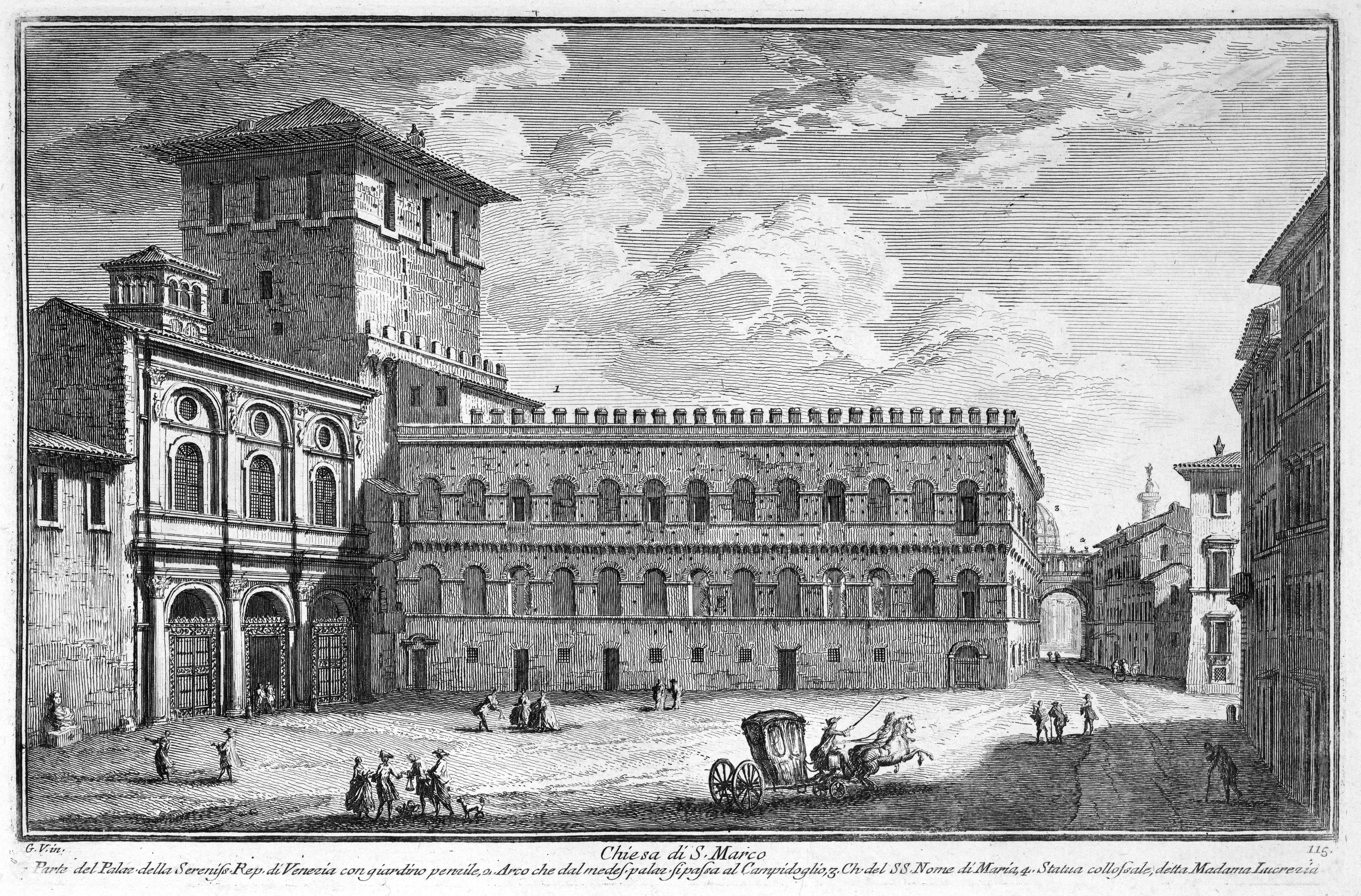
The palace in its original location in a print by Giuseppe Vasi (1756)

=== The viridarium ===
The Palazzetto originated in 1467, by the will of Pope Paul II, as the southern wing and viridarium (porticoed garden) of the more famous Palazzo San Marco. The garden and palace were joined by a quadrangular tower which faced Capitoline Hill. At the time, this tower was crowned with battlements, though was later replaced with a roof during the restoration of 1546.

The Pope used to appear on the portico that enclosed the garden during folk festivals or celebrations. Because of this, in folklore, the loggia took on a symbolic value associated with the exercise of power.

=== Development as an independent building ===
After the sudden death of Pope Paul II, on 26 July 1471, Palazzo San Marco (which included the Palazzetto) became the property of his nephew, Cardinal Marco Barbo. The prelate moved his residence to the Palazzo, close to the homonymous basilica of which he was the titular bishop, settling down in the apartments overlooking the viridarium.

On the death of Marco Barbo, the Palazzo San Marco passed to Cardinal Lorenzo Cybo de Mari, nephew of Pope Innocent VIII and Titular of the basilica from 1491 to 1501; he moved his apartments to the north wing, facing the present Via del Plebiscito. Lorenzo Cybo de Mari was responsible for placing the marble bust of Isis in front of the Basilica of San Marco. This statue—which the people believed to be a portrait of Lucrezia d'Alagno, the lover of Alfonso V of Aragon—became one of the talking statues of Rome, named Madama Lucrezia.

At the beginning of the 16th century, the Palazzo San Marco began to decline, although it continued to be a papal seat as an alternative to the Vatican. It was restored in 1527 at the behest of Pope Paul III, who chose it as his summer residence. In 1537, he had the Palazzo connected via a hanging corridor to the Tower of Paul III, which faced Capitoline Hill. During this period, the arches of the loggia of the Palazzetto were bricked up, in order to consolidate the structure. Thus, it began to have the characteristics of a distinctly separate building, and it gained the name Palazzetto di San Marco. Under Paul III, the Palazzetto was frequently used: at least seventy consistories were held there, and in 1536 it hosted an audience of Charles V.

In 1564, Pope Pius IV assigned part of Palazzo San Marco (including the Palazzetto) to the Republic of Venice, and the building became its diplomatic seat. During the earthquake of 5 October 1651, a large portion of the facade overlooking Piazza San Marco collapsed; the structure was shored up, but the damage was extensive. The building was partially restored and secured by the architect Orazio Torriani. In 1770, the closing of the arches was completed at the request of the Venetian ambassador Nicolò Erizzo, who used the resulting closed space as a single room distributed on two levels.

=== First proposed demolition ===
Following the fall of the Republic of Venice, upheld by the Treaty of Campo Formio (1797), the Palazzo became the diplomatic seat of the Austro-Hungarian Empire. During the Napoleonic era (1806–1814), it passed into the possession of the Kingdom of Italy. It was to be demolished as part of a project by Giuseppe Valadier, which aimed at converting the square into a covered market. The building was saved from destruction thanks to the interest of Antonio Canova, who therein established his Academy of Fine Arts of the Kingdom of Italy and received the support of the consul Giuseppe Tambroni and of Vivant Denon.

After the Congress of Vienna (1814–1815), the building returned to being the seat of the Austrian embassy, with some rooms accommodating scholars from the Academy of Fine Arts Vienna. During this period, the edifice was in poor conditions due to collapses and fires, the damage of which was only partially repaired.

=== Demolition and reconstruction ===
In the late 19th century, urban planning in Rome called for the scenographic enhancement of the Vittoriano, then under construction, which was to be visible from Via del Corso. To achieve this, many buildings in the neighborhood around Piazza Venezia would need to be demolished, including the Palazzetto. In 1880, the first competition for the redevelopment of the square was held. Despite protests raised by politicians and intellectuals—including the deputy Ruggero Bonghi—many historical structures were irreparably destroyed between 1885 and 1886, such as the Tower of Paul III, the Convent of Santa Maria in Aracoeli, and the annexed garden. In response to a parliamentary question presented by Bonghi, the Prime Minister Agostino Depretis replied that the eviction of the area and the demolition of squalid, unhealthy, and dilapidated buildings would restore dignity and healthiness to the square and the district. He also pointed out that none of the demolitions would cause the loss of valuable archaeological finds. Such judgment was also supported by Camillo Boito, the president of the committee responsible for redesigning the area.

Two years later, in 1888, all the buildings in Piazza San Marco and the surrounding area were demolished. However, the demolition of the Palazzetto came to a standstill due to bureaucratic delays related to the various reconstruction projects, as well as grievances from the Austrian government, who owned the building. Actual demolition of the Palazzetto did not begin until nearly twenty years later, in 1909, at which time three sides of the building were torn down. Then, due to the interest of the press, Roman public opinion and the cultural world again called for the building's preservation. A solution was reached in late September 1910, and it was decided that the Palazzetto would be rebuilt a few hundred meters away, close to the Basilica of San Marco.

Under the technical supervision of the architects Camillo Pistrucci, Ludwig Baumann, and Jacques Oblatt, the Palazzetto was relocated from the southeast corner to the southwest corner of Palazzo Venezia. Materials recovered from the demolition were reused. The new building was different from the original, due in part to the quick start of the demolition work, the narrower space available for the palace's relocation, the limits imposed by the presence of other pre-existing structures, the approximate cataloging of the parts to be reassembled, and the demand for a rapid completion of the renovation of Piazza Venezia. The reconstruction, completed in 1913, involved some architectural changes; in particular, the characteristic and unusual trapezoidal plan, due to the course of the surrounding streets, was converted into a square and the size of the building was reduced through the elimination of an arch on each side. The courtyard was enclosed by two orders of arcades—supported by octagonal travertine columns with composite capitals, and columns with ionic capitals—and centered with a well sculpted by Antonio da Caravaggio. During the excavations for the demolition and relocation of the Palazzetto, some archaeological finds came to light; one of them, a marble slab representing a man and a woman lying on a klinē (couch) with two handmaids serving them food, was repurposed upside-down as the sill of a window overlooking Via degli Astalli.

=== Use in modern times ===
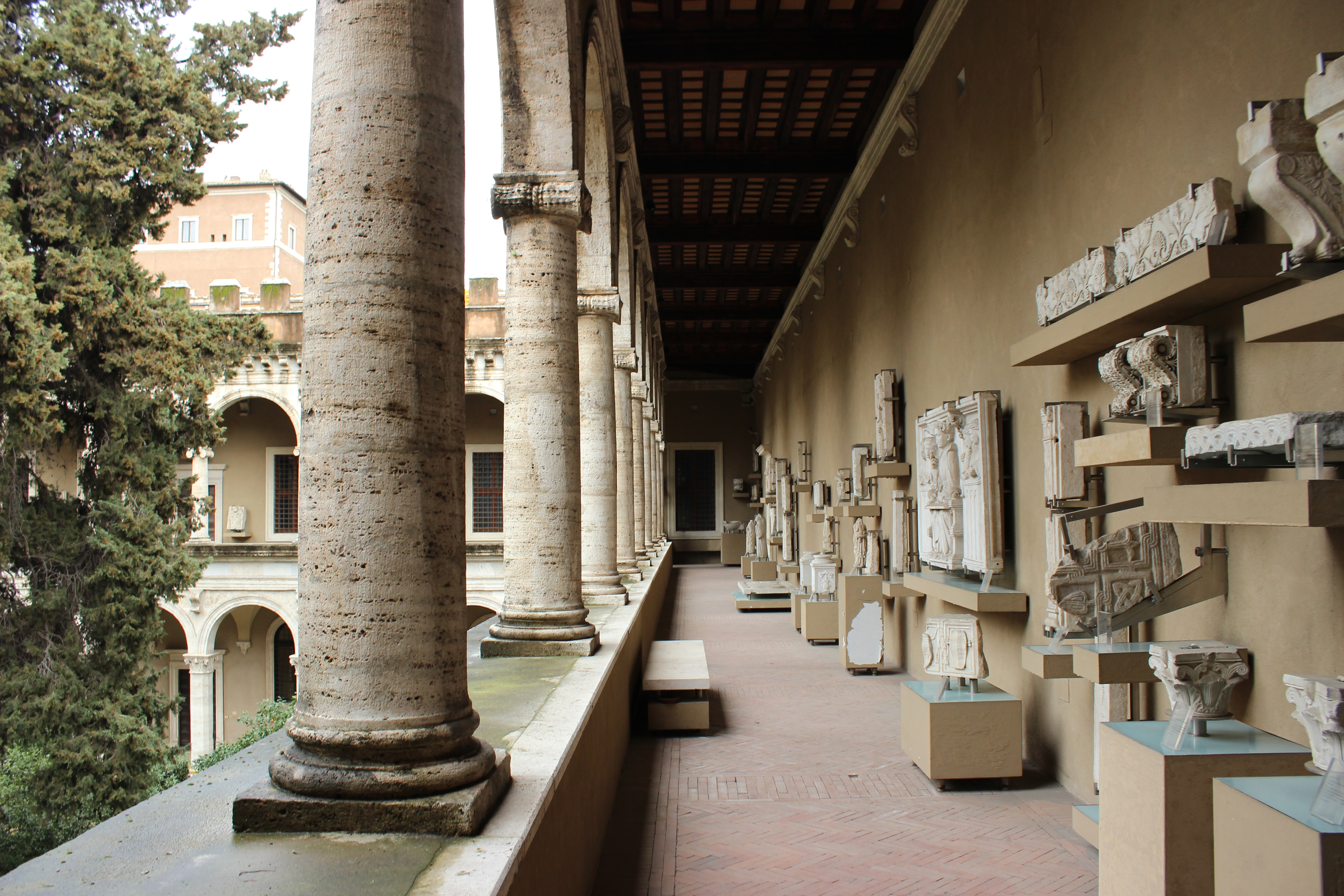
The lapidarium of the Museum of Palazzo Venezia in the upper loggia of the Palazzetto

In 1916, the Palazzetto became property of the Italian State. In 1925, under Fascist Italy, it was used as a residence for public officials and a representative office.

Since 2006, it has been part of the Museum of Palazzo Venezia and its upper loggia houses the museum's lapidarium. Since 1944, the building has also been the headquarters of the Italian Society for International Organizations.

Between 2010 and 2011, during renovation and cleaning works in some deposits of Palazzo and Palazzetto Venezia, a wooden trap door was discovered. Subsequent investigations revealed the presence of an unfinished bunker beneath the building, located about 15 metres (49 ft) under the pavement and accessed via a narrow walkway of Roman origin. The bunker is about 80 square metres (860 sq ft) and consists of nine rooms which could have accommodated no more than a couple of people. Its construction secretly began around 1942, and it would have become the twelfth bunker in Rome, with the aim of protecting Mussolini from possible Allied air raids, such as the so-called "Operation Dux". The refuge was never completed; there are no sewage or electrical systems, and construction of escape routes was never begun (though there may have been two planned: one towards the Vittoriano and one towards the gardens of the Palazzetto).

== Bibliography ==
- Barberini, Maria Giulia (2008). Tracce di pietra. La collezione di marmi di Palazzo Venezia. Rome: Campisano editore. ISBN 9788888168364.
- Christoph Luitpold Frommel (1984). Francesco del Borgo: Architekt Pius' II und Pauls II. Palazzo Venezia, Palazzetto Venezia und San Marco in "Römisches Jahrbuch für Kunstgeschicht" XXI (in German). pp. 71–164.
- Barberini, Maria Giulia; De Angelis d'Ossat, Matilde; Schiavon, Alessandra (22 October 2015). La storia del Palazzo di Venezia: dalle collezioni Barbo e Grimani a sede dell'ambasciata veneta e austriaca. Gangemi Editore. ISBN 9788849293661.

== See also ==
- Palazzo Venezia
- Piazza Venezia
- Museo nazionale del Palazzo di Venezia
