= Venezia (Rome Metro) =

Future train station in Rome, Italy

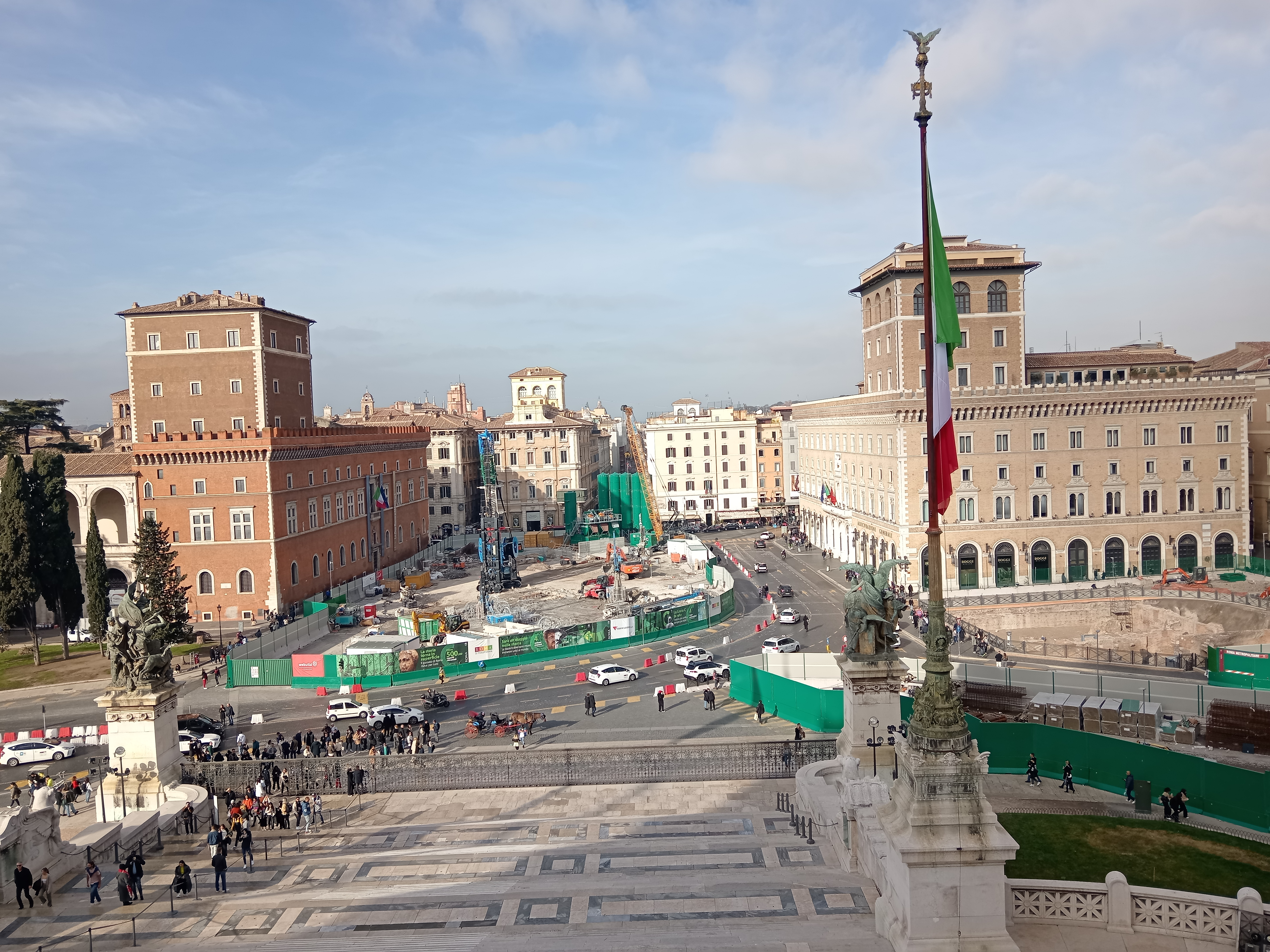
- Construction site on the square, 23 December 2023

General information
- Coordinates: 41°53′44″N 12°28′58″E
- Owner: ATAC
- Line: Line C
- Tracks: 2

Construction
- Structure type: Underground

History
- Opening: 2033; 7 years' time

Services
Preceding station	Rome Metro	Following station
Future service
Chiesa Nuova towards Farnesina	Line C	Colosseo towards Monte Compatri-Pantano
Location

Venezia is a metro station under construction on Line C of the Rome Metro system in Piazza Venezia, in the heart of the city. Construction works started on 22 June 2023.

The station will sink 40 meters below street level with 8 underground levels. The construction of the station represents a major engineering challenge, involving meticulous archaeological excavations to restore the treasures long buried beneath the square. The station will enjoy three main entrances: Palazzo Venezia, Hadrian's Athenaeum and Vittoriano. The new station will be part of the archeostations circuit of the Rome Metro and will constitute a large underground museum complex.

The expected cost of the work is 700 million euros compared to an average expenditure normally necessary for a subway station of 100–150 million euros, due to the complexity of the composition of the terrain and the archaeological state which made it necessary to plan the removal of 66 thousand cubic meters of material with the procedures of an archaeological excavation. The station will be equipped with 6 lifts, 27 escalators and 110 meters of platforms.

== Location ==
Venezia station will be located underneath the Piazza Venezia, a large square in Pigna, rione IX of Rome. Upon its completion, it will be the closest station to the Monument to Vittorio Emanuele II, Roman Forum and Capitoline Hill.

The masterplan includes the connection with the future Line D and the intersection with Line C at the Venezia metro station.

== History ==
In 2009, as part of preliminary works for the station, a series of archaeological excavations were carried out. During these digs, archaeologists unearthed the remains of Emperor Hadrian's Athenaeum.

Construction works started on 22 June 2023. The station is expected to become operational in 2032.
