= Sant'Urbano a Campo Carleo (Rome) =

St. Urban at Campo Carleo
- Sant'Urbano a Campo Carleo
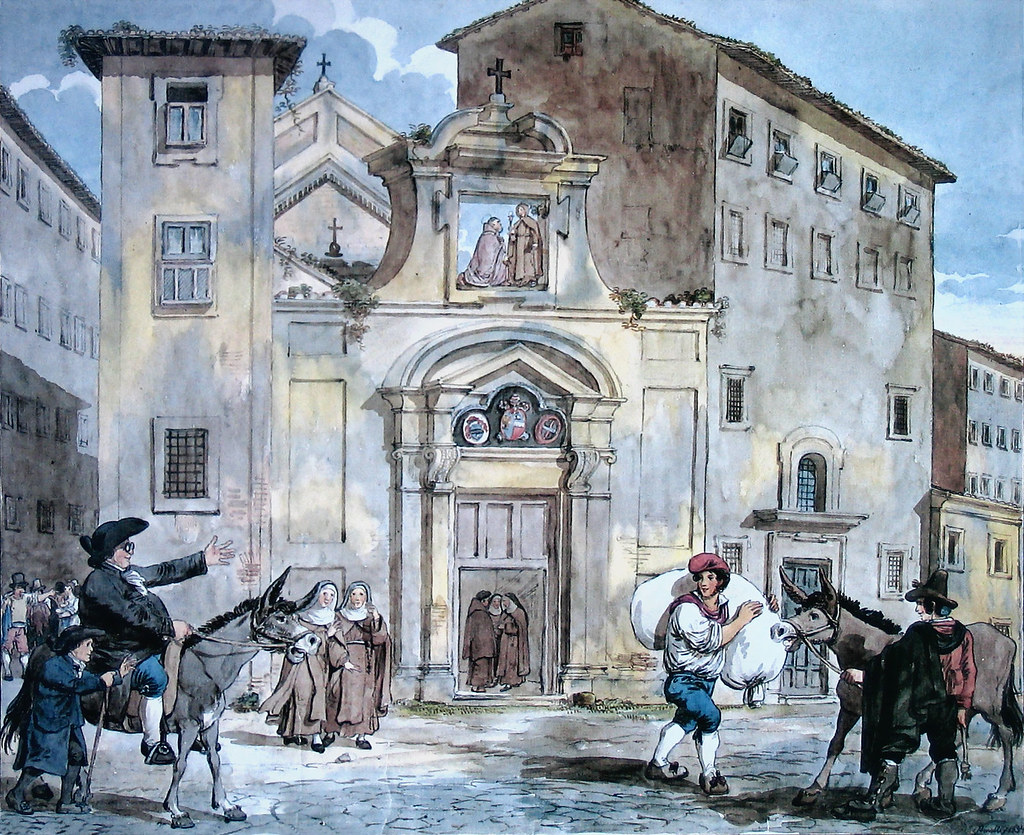
- Sant'Urbano a Campo Carleo, watercolor by Achille Pinelli (1834).
- St. Urban at Campo Carleo
- Location: Rome, Via Alessandrina
- Country: Italy
- Denomination: Catholic

History
- Dedication: Pope Urban I
- Consecrated: 15 August 1264

Architecture
- Demolished: 1930s

Sant'Urbano a Campo Carleo was a church in Rome (Italy), in the Rione Monti, on the former Via Alessandrina.

== History ==
The church, along with the adjoining Benedictine monastery, was consecrated on 15 August 1264 by Pope Urban IV and built thanks to the generous bequest of the noblewoman Giacoma Bianchi. The toponym comes from the name with which the area was called in the Middle Ages, Campo Carleo, with reference to the palace of a local nobleman, Carlo Leone; the documents also mention the area with the name of campus Caloleonis. From the 16th century on, the church was also known as Sant'Urbano ai Pantani, from the nearby Arco dei Pantani.

The early church fell into disrepair: towards the end of the 15th century it was so dilapidated that for the Jubilee of 1600 it was decided to build a new one, to a design by Mario Arconi. The oldest one, however, was not destroyed, but, according to sources, «post absidem novi templi profanata et in foenile redacta» ("deconsecrated behind the apse of the new temple and converted into a barn"). Restorations took place under the auspices of Francesco Maria del Monte, who was later buried in the church.

The adjoining monastery, which was rebuilt as well, was converted by Pope Clement VIII, at the request of Cardinal Baronio, into a hospice for the spinsters, popularly called le sperse di sant'Eufemia ("the dispersed of St. Euphemia"). The conservatory of Sant'Eufemia and the adjoining church were demolished in the 1930s during the works that brought to light the Imperial fora.

== Description ==
The church had a single nave, with a high altar and two side ones. On the right altar there was an Annunciation by Girolamo Muziano; on the main altar a canvas depicting St. Urban, St. Clare, the Madonna and the angels by Sebastiano Ceccarini; on the left altar, St. Charles, St. Francis and St. Nicholas by Ottavio Leoni.
In the refectory of the annexed monastery of Sant'Eufemia there was a valuable fresco, by an unknown artist, dating back to the 17th century and depicting the Samaritan woman at the well: it has been recently restored and is now on display in the Museo di Roma.

== Bibliography ==
- Mariano Armellini, Le chiese di Roma dal secolo IV al XIX, Rome 1891, pp. 169–170
- Christian Hülsen (1927). "Le chiese di Roma nel Medio Evo". Florence. p. 501.
- Claudio Rendina, Le Chiese di Roma, Newton & Compton Editori, Milan 2000, 367
