= Athenaeum (ancient Rome) =

Ancient Roman school founded by Hadrian

Athenaeum of Hadrian (Rome)
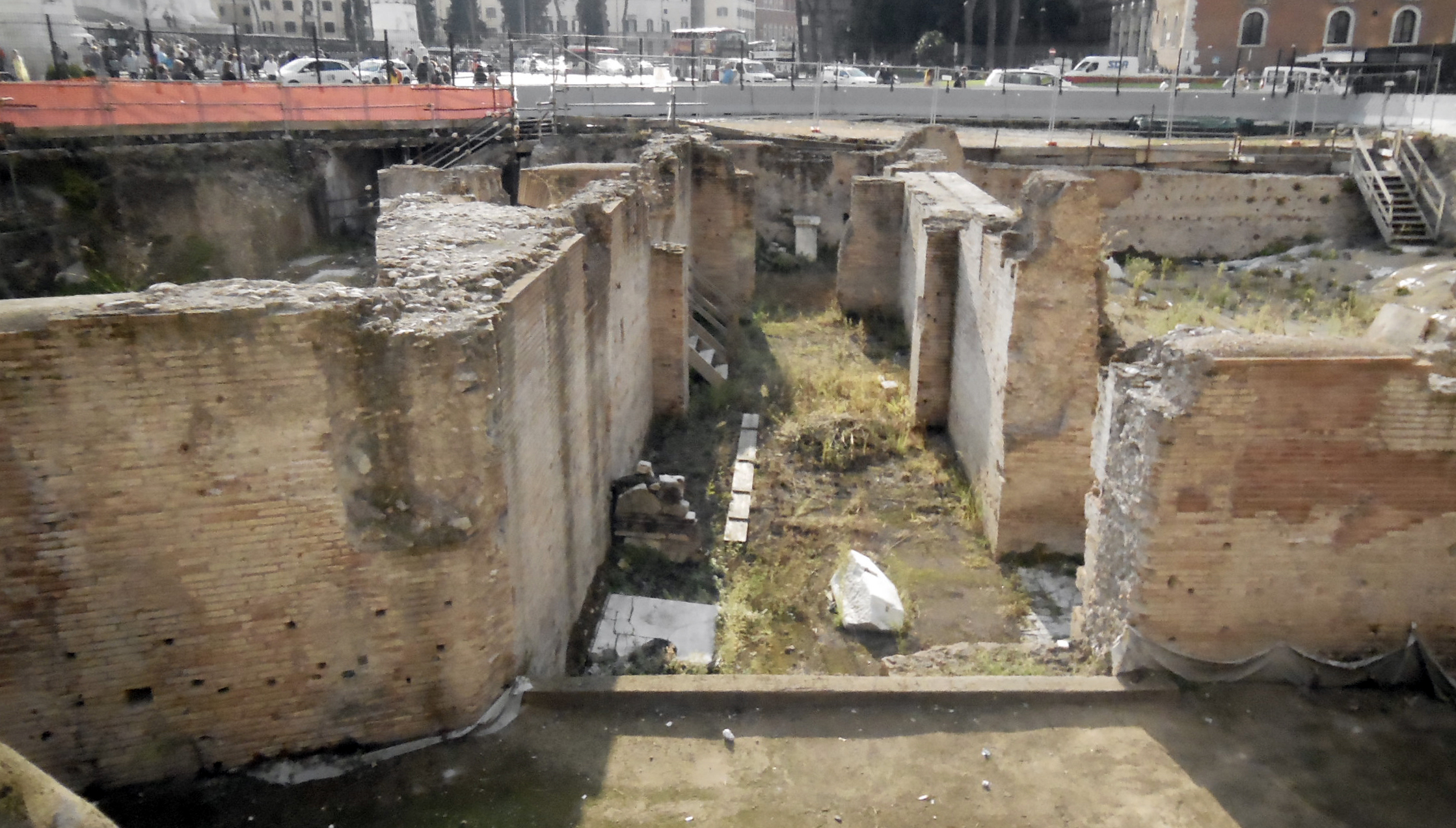
- Excavations of the Athenaeum: view of the corridor between the central and the south hall

- Location within Rome
- 41°53′45.2″N 12°28′59.63″E
- Type: Auditorium; Ludus
- Location: Regione VII Via Lata

History
- Built by: Hadrian

The Athenaeum was a school (ludus) founded by the Emperor Hadrian for the promotion of literary and scientific studies (ingenuarum artium). The name "Athenaeum" came from the city of Athens, which was still regarded as the seat of intellectual refinement. The Athenaeum was situated near the Capitoline Hill: its site was discovered in 2009 during excavation for the construction of the Rome Metro C Line (Venezia station), in the middle of what is now Piazza Venezia.

A staff of professors, for the various branches of study, was regularly engaged. Under Theodosius II, for example, there were three orators, ten grammarians, five sophists, one philosopher, two lawyers, or jurisconsults. Besides the instruction given by these magistri, poets, orators, and critics were accustomed to recite their compositions there, and these prelections were sometimes honoured with the presence of the emperors themselves. There were other places, as the Ulpian Library, where such recitations were made; sometimes also a room was hired, and made into an auditorium.

The Athenaeum seems to have continued in high repute till the sixth century. Little is known of the details of study or discipline in the Athenaeum, but in the constitution of the year 370, there are some regulations respecting students in Rome, from which it would appear that it must have been a very extensive and important institution. And this is confirmed by other statements contained in some of the Fathers and other ancient authors, from which we learn that young men from all parts, after finishing their usual school and college studies in their own town or province, used to resort to Rome as a sort of higher university, for the purpose of completing their education.

== Legacy ==
After the moving of the capital city to Mediolanum and Constantinople similar schools were opened also in these cities, as well as in the other main cities of the Empire, like Carthage.

In the modern period, the term Athenaeum is widely used in various countries for schools, libraries, museums, cultural centers, performance halls and theatres, periodicals, clubs and societies – all aspiring to fulfill a cultural function similar to that of the ancient Roman school.
