= Chiesa Nuova (Rome Metro) =

Planned metro station in Rome, Italy

General information
- Location: Piazza della Chiesa Nuova; Rome, RM; Italy
- Coordinates: 41°53′52″N 12°28′8″E
- Line: Line C
- Tracks: 2

Construction
- Structure type: Underground
- Accessible: yes

History
- Opening: 2036; 10 years' time

Services
Preceding station	Rome Metro	Following station
Future service
Piazza Pia towards Farnesina	Line C	Venezia towards Monte Compatri-Pantano
Location
- Click on the map to see marker

Chiesa Nuova is a metro station under construction on Line C of the Rome Metro system.

== Location ==
Chiesa Nuova station will be located underneath the Piazza della Chiesa Nuova, which takes its name from the church of the same name. About 500 m (1,600 ft) to the east is the famous Piazza Navona. Along with the Chiesa Nuova, there are a number of churches in the immediate area, including the Santa Maria della Pace, Sant'Agnese in Agone, and San Salvatore in Lauro.
