= Convent of Aracoeli =

Historic monastic complex in Rome, Italy

- Convento di Santa Maria in Aracoeli
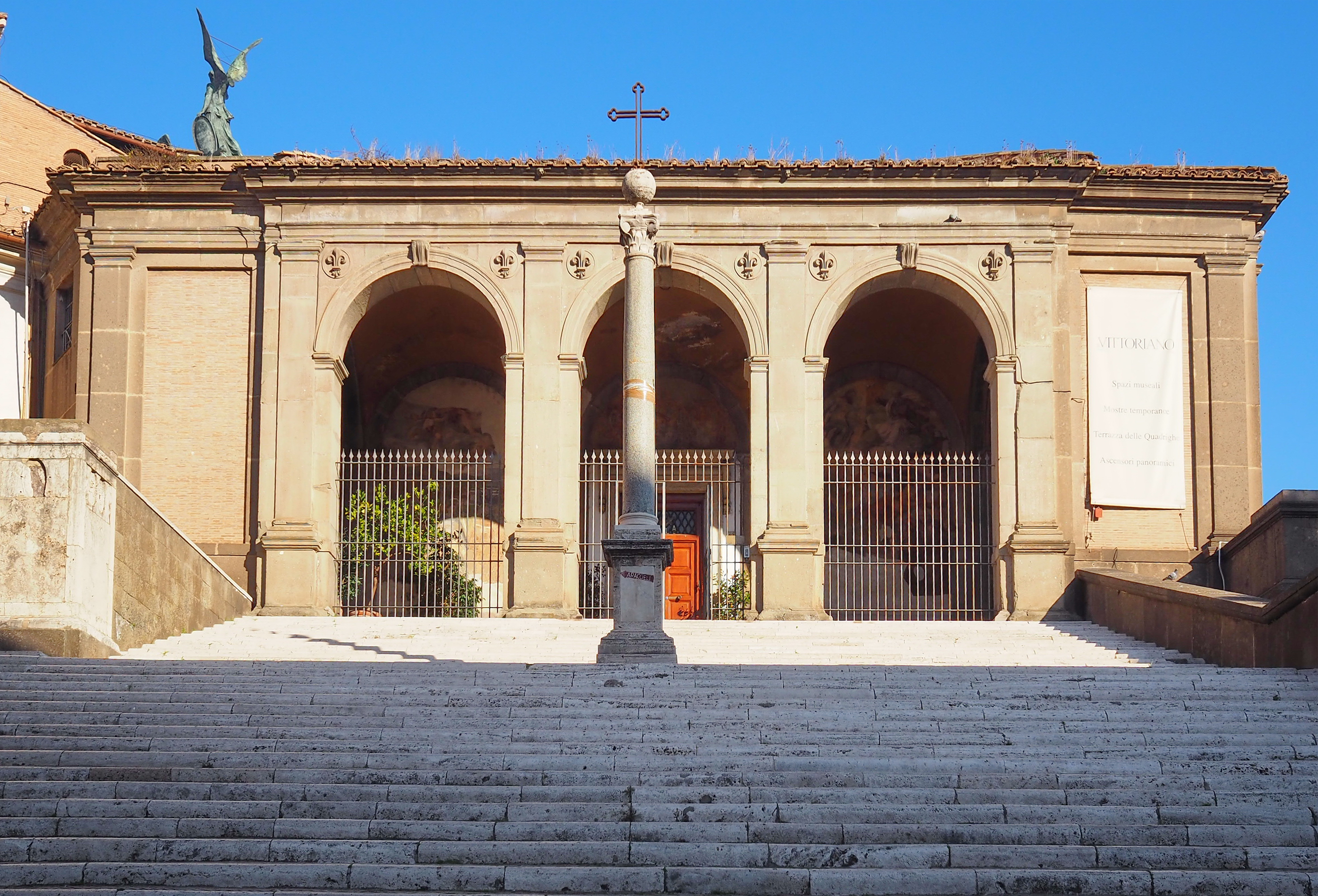
- Convent of Aracoeli, the loggia of Paul III

Religion
- Affiliation: Benedictines, Friars Minor
- Patron: St. Mary

Location
- Location: Rome, Italy
- Interactive map of Convent of Aracoeli
- Administration: Diocese of Rome

Architecture
- Established: 6th century
- Demolished: 1886

The Convent of Santa Maria in Aracoeli, also called Convent of Aracoeli and formerly known as Convent of Santa Maria in Capitolio, was a historic monastic complex of medieval origin in Rome, Italy, which first belonged to the Order of Saint Benedict and then to the Franciscans.

Located on the Capitolium, next to the basilica of the same name, it was demolished in 1886 during the construction of the Vittoriano, after a history of more than a millennium. In the same period, another Franciscan convent was built next to the staircase, bearing the same name but much smaller than the historical one.

The only remnant of the convent is the 16th-century loggia located on the right side of the basilica at the end of a staircase, with the portico giving access from the basilica.

== History ==
=== Origin ===
The convent arose in the templar area which also included the Temple of Jupiter Capitoline, and probably dates back to the 6th century. It was built on the ruins of a former imposing complex of monuments that was destroyed by the Vandals in the 5th century. Gradually, these ruins were replaced by the Basilica and the Convent of Aracoeli, which were built by reusing some of the same construction material. Starting from the 10th century, the Rule of Saint Benedict was observed at the convent.

In the 13th century, Saint Francis of Assisi may have found refuge in the convent during his stays in Rome. For this reason, as well as for its central position within the city, a few years after the Saint's death, the convent became the main Roman seat of the nascent Franciscan order of Friars Minor. In 1250, Pope Innocent IV entrusted the complex, including the adjoining basilica, to the Franciscans. From this moment on, the institution maintained an increasing cooperation with the Municipality of Rome, which was based in the adjacent Piazza del Campidoglio. In 1310, the Franciscans opened a studium, which operated as a university institute from 1421 to 1444. In 1444, with Pope Eugene IV, the convent changed from the Conventual Franciscans to the Observant Minors; in 1517, it became the Generalate of the latter, a role it held until the definitive demolition of the convent in 1886. Nonetheless, the institution always maintained the connotation of a center of culture and teaching, since it was the seat of a seminary for novices and a hospice for scholars.

=== 16th-century expansions ===
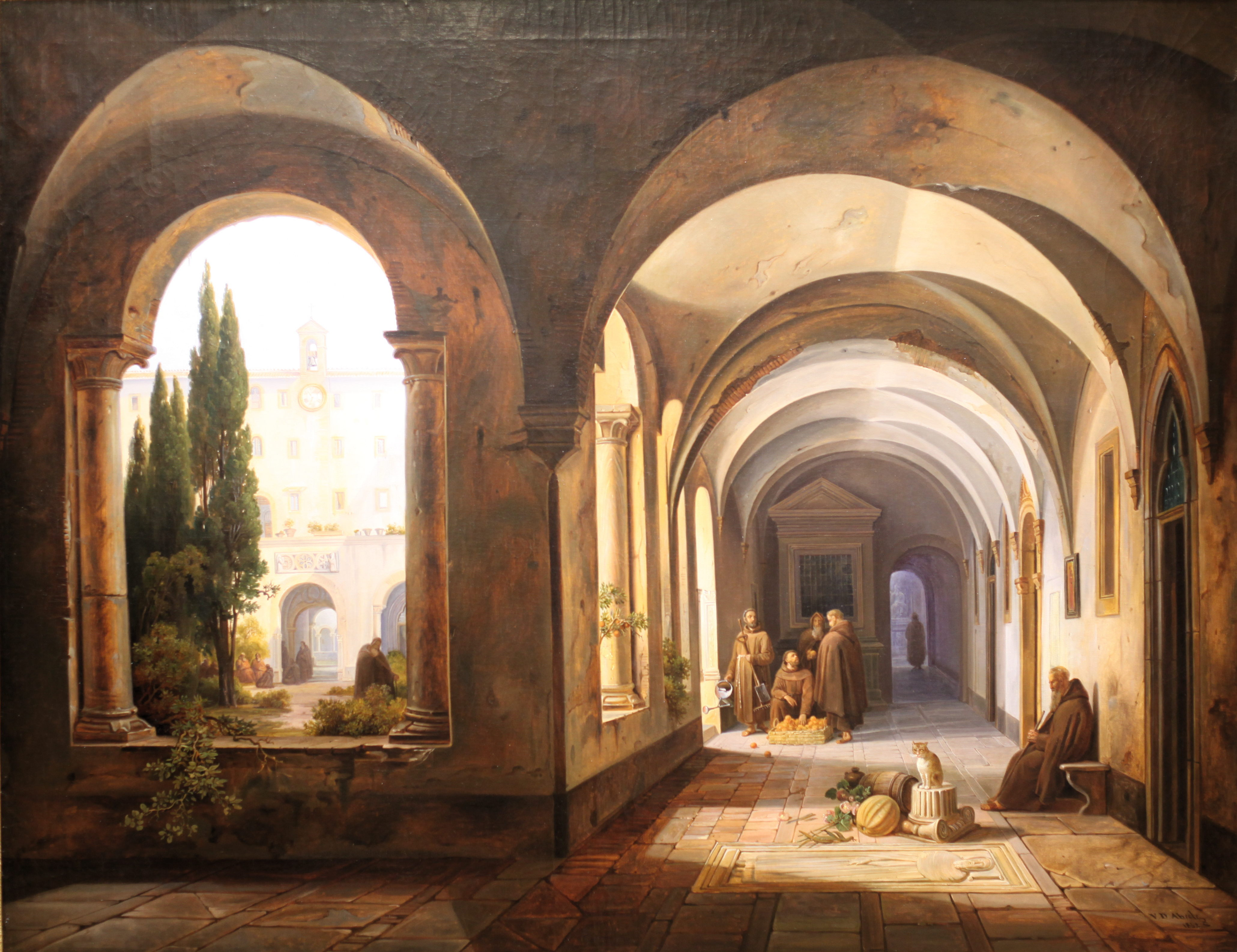
Franciscan monks in the cloister of Santa Maria in Ara Coeli by Jodocus Sebastiaen van den Abeele (1842)

The convent was gradually expanded to include three cloisters. In 1535, the papal villa commonly called Tower of Paul III (named for the Pope who ordered its construction: Paul III) was built close to the edifice. Another addition was the elevated walkway called Arco San Marco, which connected the convent with Palazzetto San Marco (now Palazzetto Venezia), part of Palazzo di San Marco (now Palazzo Venezia).

Monastery activities included hospitality and care of the sick. Since the Middle Ages, it also housed a vast library, which by the 19th century contained over 17,000 volumes, including manuscripts. This rich library, re-founded in 1733 and called Bibliotheca Aracoelitana (or Evoriana, from Évora, Portugal, the city of origin of its founder, the Franciscan José Ribeiro da Fonseca) was open to the public.

=== French invasion and demolition ===
In 1798, during the first French invasion, the convent was deconsecrated and used as a stable; with the advent of the Napoleonic government (1810–1815), it became the seat of the Accademia di San Luca for a short time.

In 1873—soon after the unification of Italy, when many religious orders were suppressed and several ecclesiastical buildings and assets confiscated—the Italian State expropriated the complex and used it as the headquarters of the traffic police. Finally, in 1886, the monastery was almost entirely demolished to make way for the Vittoriano, thereby ending a more-than-millennial history.

== See also ==
- Santa Maria in Ara Coeli
- Capitoline Hill
- Tower of Paul III

== Bibliography ==
- F. Casimiro (1736). Memorie istoriche della chiesa e convento di S. Maria in Araceli di Roma. Rome: R. Bernabo. ISBN 978-1174848391.
- Paola Degni; Pier Luigi Porzio (2011). La fabbrica del convento: memorie storiche, trasformazioni e recupero del complesso di San Francesco a Ripa in Trastevere. Rome: Donzelli Editore. ISBN 9788860366429.
- Marianna Brancia di Apricena (2000). Il complesso dell'Aracoeli sul Colle Capitolino, IX–XIX secolo. Rome: Edizioni Quasar. ISBN 8871401670.
- Paolo Lombardo; Gaetano Passarelli (2003). Ara Coeli: la basilica e il convento: dal XVI al XX secolo attraverso le stampe del fondo della postulazione della Provincia romana dei frati minori. Rome: Tiellemedia. ISBN 8887604142.
- Leonhard Lemmens (1845). De sorte Archivi Generalis Ordinis Fratrum Minorum et Bibliothecae Aracoelitanae tempore Reipublicae Tiberinae (an. 1798, 1799). Rome: Tip. della R. C. A.
