= Tower of Paul III (Rome) =

- Torre di Paolo III
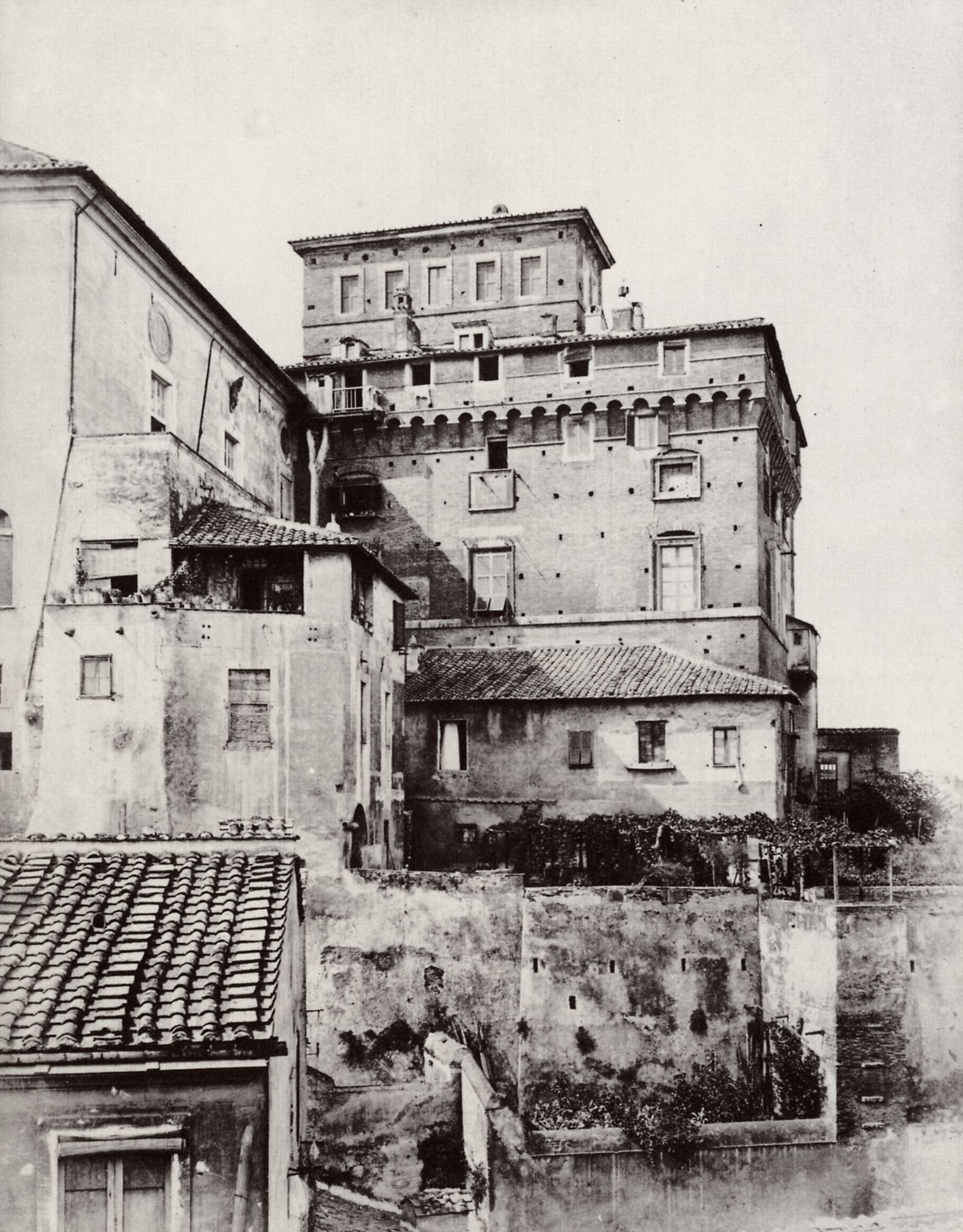
- The Tower of Paul III at the Capitolium, photo by John Henry Parker (c. 1870).
- Interactive map of the Tower of Paul III area
- Alternative names: Palazzo di Aracoeli; Rocca Paolina; Torre Paolina

General information
- Status: No longer extant
- Type: Villa-fortress
- Location: Rome, Italy
- Groundbreaking: 16th century
- Completed: 1535
- Demolished: 1886

Design and construction
- Architect: Jacopo Meleghino

The so-called Tower of Paul III (Italian: Torre di Paolo III) was a characteristic fortified villa belonging to the Popes, rising on the Capitoline Hill in Rome (Italy).
The edifice was built in the 16th century by the architect Jacopo Meleghino at the behest of Pope Paul III and demolished in 1886 as part of the construction works of the Vittoriano. Its official name was Palazzo di Aracoeli, but it was also known as Rocca Paolina and Torre Paolina.

== History ==
The tower took its name from Pope Paul III, who commissioned its construction soon after his own election, to underline the importance of the papal power over the city. It was annexed to the Franciscan Convent of Aracoeli (whose structures were almost entirely demolished as well) and rose at the foot of the Basilica of Ara Coeli, on the north side of the hill facing Via del Corso.

It was used as a summer residence for the Popes, but also as a residence for Cardinals by decision of Julius III; finally, Sixtus V assigned it permanently to the Franciscans of Ara Coeli.
In 1886 it was one of the first buildings to be demolished for the construction of the Monument to Victor Emmanuel II. The tower dominated the north end of Via del Corso, just above the Palazzetto di San Marco (to which it was connected by a corridor), and occupied approximately the same position of the current equestrian statue of the King. At the time, the demolition of the tower and of the adjacent historic structures saw a bitter polemic exchange between numerous scholars and intellectuals, even outside Italy.

== Structure ==
The Tower had a characteristic massive structure with an approximately cubic shape, hanging over the square below, as can be clearly seen in the images and ancient photographs of the Capitolium; it was adjacent to one of the three fifteenth-century cloisters of the Convent of Ara Coeli, which was demolished as well.
The edifice was connected to the Palazzetto San Marco – the present Palazzetto Venezia, which however has been reconstructed, with several variations, on the opposite side of Palazzo Venezia – by a skywalk supported by high arches, also built by the Farnese Pope and known as Arch of St. Mark (or popularly "passetto"), which delimited the south side of the square: it was demolished during the construction works of the Vittoriano.
The external walls of the Tower had small rectangular windows surmounted by blind arches, which recalled the pattern of the arches of the nearby Colosseum; the upper part was crowned with long battlements.
The interior of the structure originally boasted a rich decoration, which has largely been lost: the only surviving works, thanks to the efforts of the painter Filippo Prosperi, are some detached frescoes from the school of Raphael (Taddeo Zuccari, Michele da Lucca, maybe Perino del Vaga).

== Bibliography ==
- Brancia di Apricena, Marianna (1997). "La committenza edilizia di Paolo III Farnese sul Campidoglio". Römisches Jahrbuch der Bibliotheca Hertziana. 32.
- Antinori, Aloisio (2011). La magnificenza e l'utile: progetto urbano e monarchia papale nella Roma del Seicento. Gangemi. ISBN 978-8849215656.
- Amadei, Emma (1969). Le torri di Roma. Rome: Palombi.
- Picardi, Paola (2004). "Gli affreschi del palazzo di Paolo III al Campidoglio: un salvataggio anomalo". Paragone. 54 (march): 3–26.
