= Piazza Venezia =

Square in Rome, Italy

- City square
- {{{other_names}}}
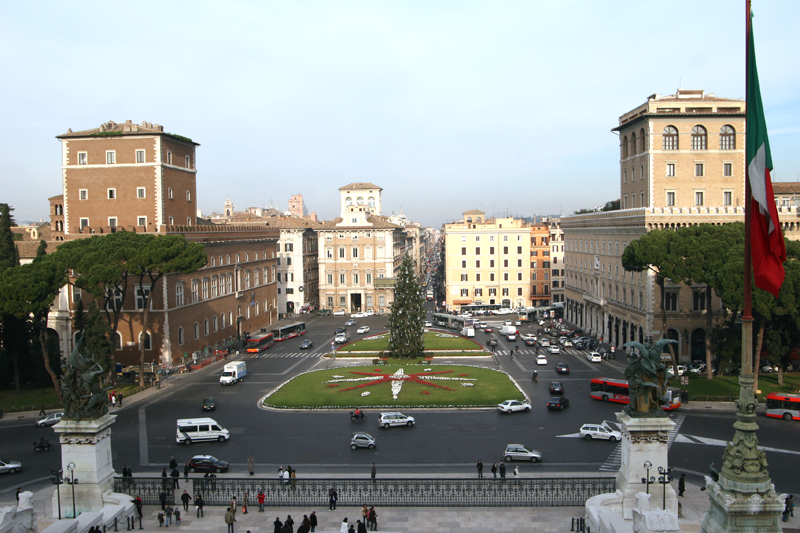
- Piazza Venezia, as seen from the Monument to Vittorio Emanuele II with Palazzo Venezia to the left
- Location: Rome, Italy
- Interactive map of Piazza Venezia
- Coordinates: 41°53′47″N 12°28′57″E

Piazza Venezia (Italian: [ˈpjattsa veˈnɛttsja]; "Venice Square") is a central hub of Rome, Italy, in which several thoroughfares intersect, including the Via dei Fori Imperiali and the Via del Corso. It takes its name from the Palazzo Venezia, built by the Venetian Cardinal, Pietro Barbo (later Pope Paul II) alongside the church of Saint Mark, the patron saint of Venice. The Palazzo Venezia served as the embassy of the Republic of Venice in Rome.

== Square ==
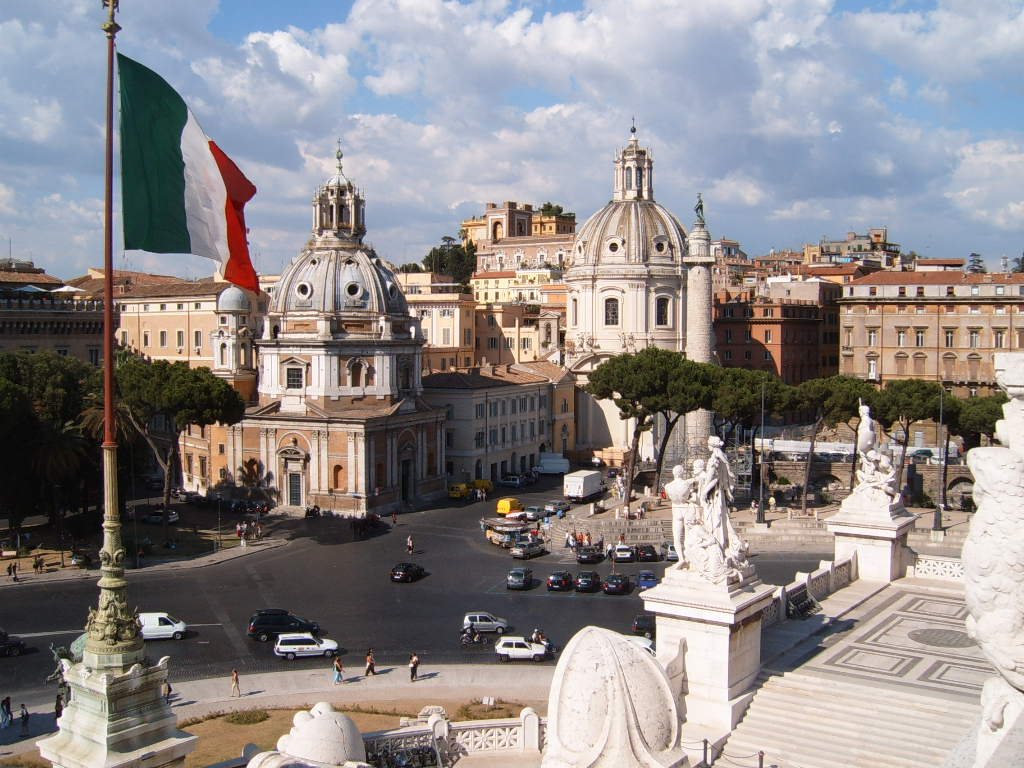
Piazza Venezia, with Trajan's Column, as seen from the Victor Emmanuel II monument.

One side of the Piazza is the site of Italy's Tomb of the Unknown Soldier in the Altare della Patria, part of the Monument to Vittorio Emanuele II, first king of Italy.

The piazza or square is at the foot of the Capitoline Hill and next to Trajan's Forum. The main artery, the Via dei Fori Imperiali begins there and leads past the Roman Forum to the Colosseum.

Most tourists in Rome visit the Piazza Venezia, which is a short walk from several of Rome's best known sights, including the Roman Forum, Capitoline Hill, Palazzo Venezia, and the famous Pantheon.

== History ==
Capitalizing on this modern and ancient symbolism--and the useful open space--Piazza Venezia was the location of public speeches given by the Italian dictator Mussolini to crowds of his supporters in the 1920s-1940s.

== Excavations ==
In 2009, during excavations in the middle of the square for the construction of the Rome C Metro Line (station Venezia), remains of the emperor Hadrian's Athenaeum were unearthed.

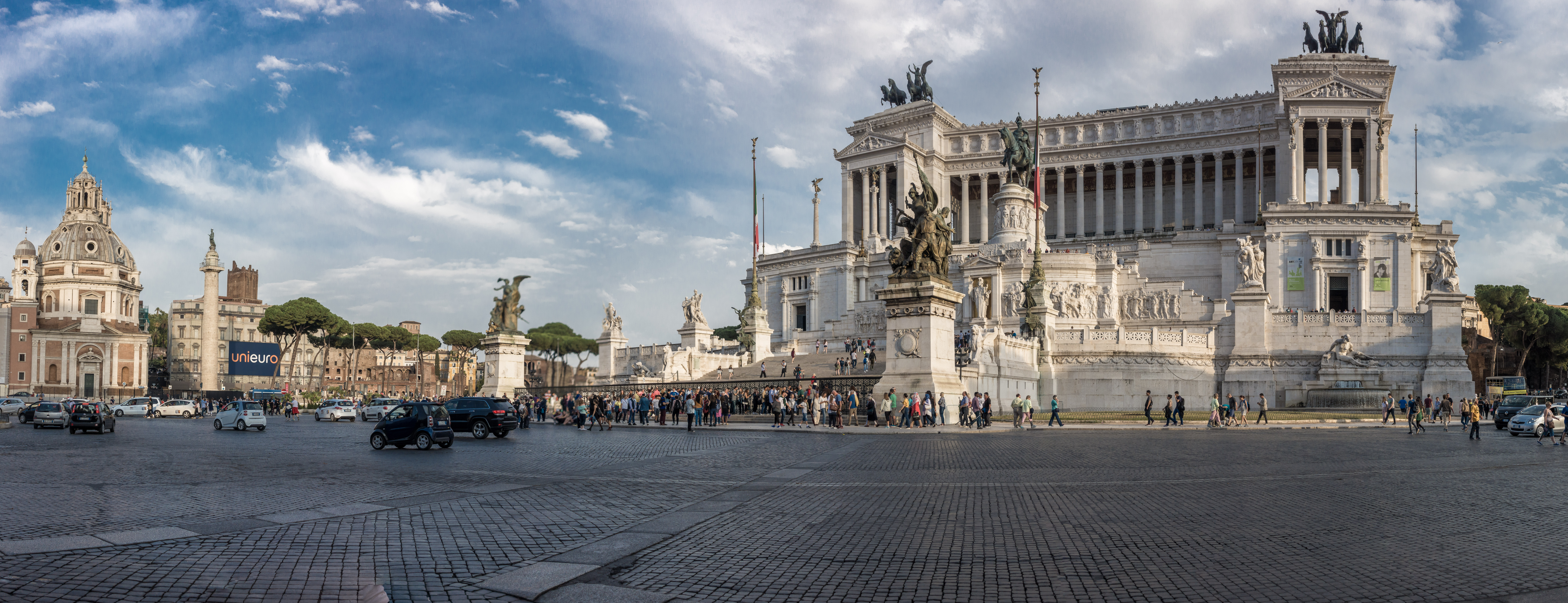
A view from the Piazza Venezia, looking towards Altare della Patria from the North-West

Preceded by Piazza di Spagna	Landmarks of Rome; Piazza Venezia	Succeeded by Via dei Coronari
