= Palazzo Venezia =

Historic palace in central Rome, Italy

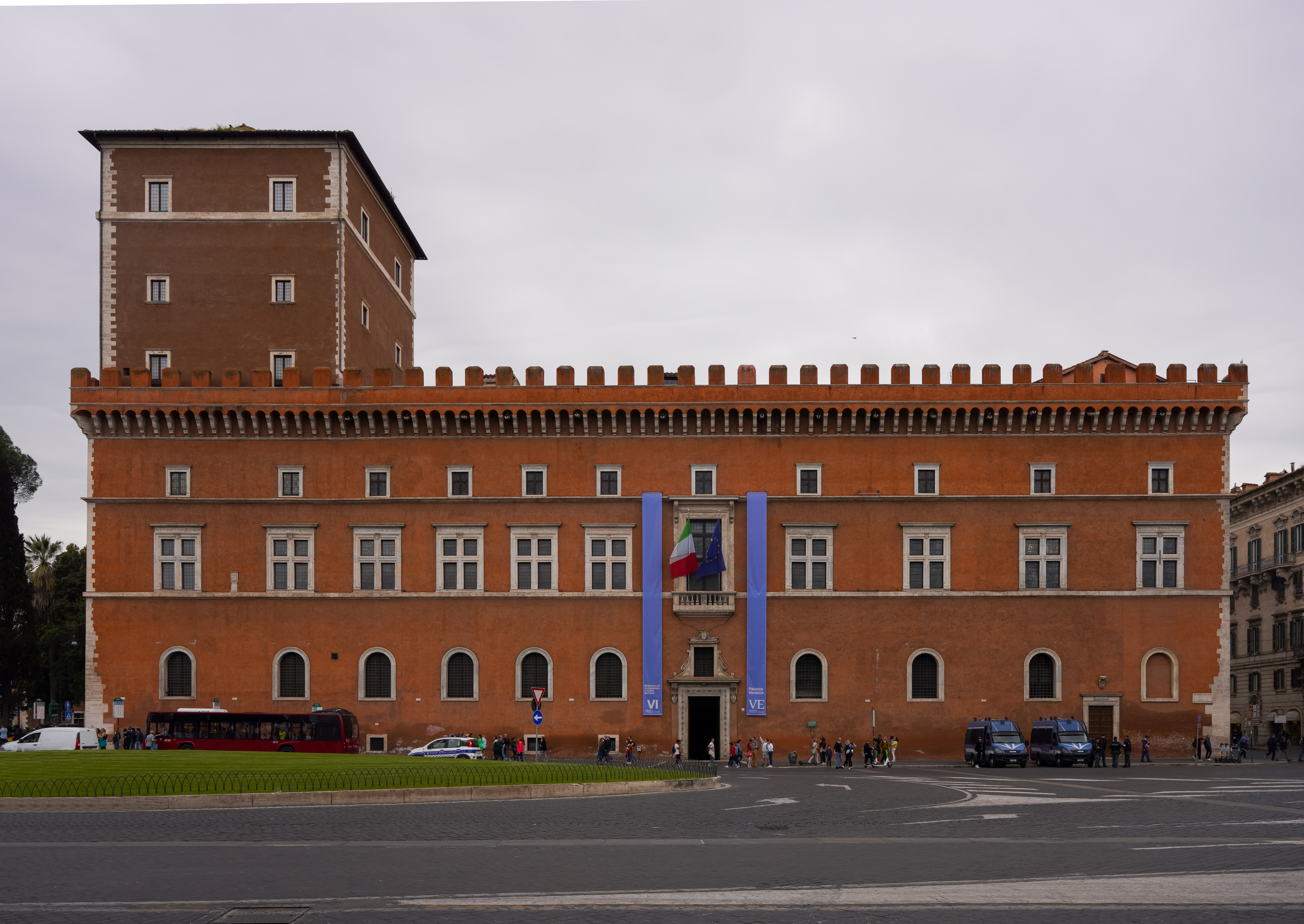
- Palazzo Venezia, main front (east front) facing the Piazza Venezia
- Click on the map to see marker

General information
- Location: north of the Capitoline Hill, Rome, Italy
- Coordinates: 41°53′46″N 12°28′53″E

The Palazzo Venezia (Italian: [paˈlattso veˈnɛttsja]; 'Venice Palace') or Palazzo Barbo, formerly Palazzo di San Marco ('Saint Mark's Palace'), is a large early Renaissance palace in central Rome, Italy, situated to the north of the Capitoline Hill. Today the property of the Italian Republic it houses the National Museum of the Palazzo Venezia. The main (eastern) facade measures 77 metres (253 ft) in length, with a height (excluding tower) of about 31 metres (102 ft). The north wing, containing the "Cibo Apartment", extending westwards, measures 122 metres (400 ft) in length. It covers an area of 1.2 hectares (2.9 acres) and encloses two gardens and the Basilica of Saint Mark. It was built in the present form during the 1450s by Cardinal Pietro Barbo (1417–1471), titular holder of the Basilica of Saint Mark, who from 1464 ruled as Pope Paul II. Barbo, a Venetian by birth as was customary for cardinals of the Basilica of Saint Mark, lived there even as pope and amassed there a great collection of art and antiquities. During the first half of the 20th century it became the residence and headquarters of Benito Mussolini, dictator of Fascist Italy (1922–1943), who made notable orations from its balcony to huge crowds filling the Piazza Venezia.

The original structure of this great architectural complex consisted of a modest medieval house intended as the residence of the cardinals appointed as the titular holders of the Basilica of Saint Mark. In 1469, having undergone a massive extension, it became a papal residence and in 1564 Pope Pius IV, in order to win the sympathies of the Republic of Venice, of which the patron was Mark the Evangelist, gave the mansion to the Venetian embassy to Rome on condition that part of the building would remain a residence for the cardinals of the Basilica of Saint Mark, which part is now known as the Cibo (or Cybo) Apartment, and that the Venetian Republic would provide for the building's maintenance and future restoration. The main eastern facade of the palace faces Piazza Venezia and the north wing, containing the Cibo Apartment, forms part of the south side of the Via del Plebiscito.

== History ==
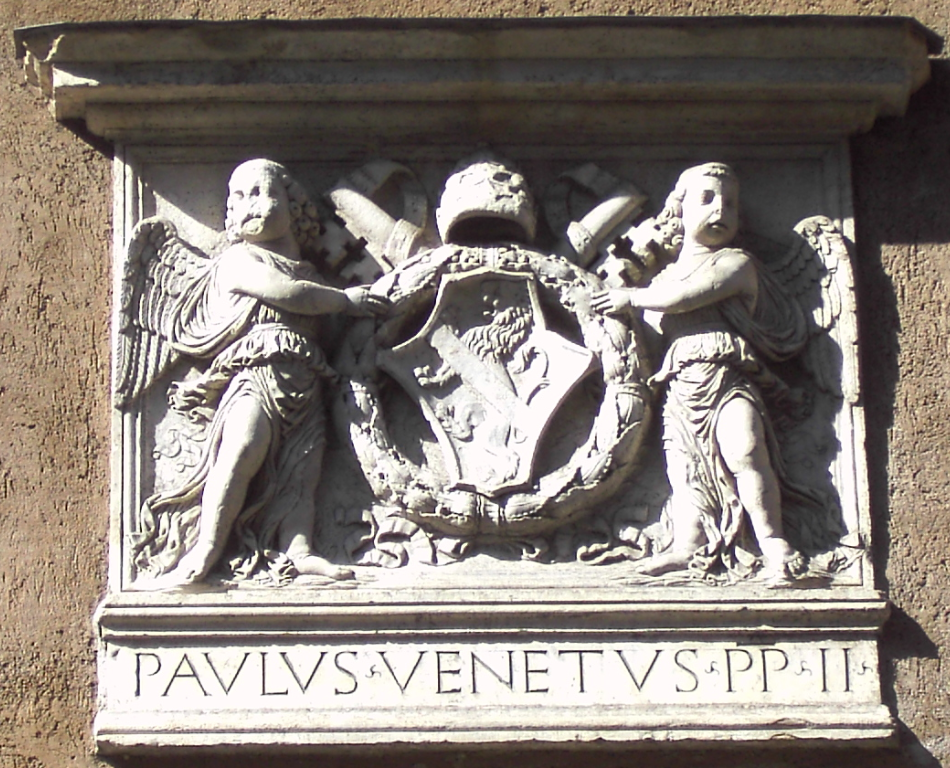
Arms of Pope Paul II (Pietro Barbo), builder of the present structure

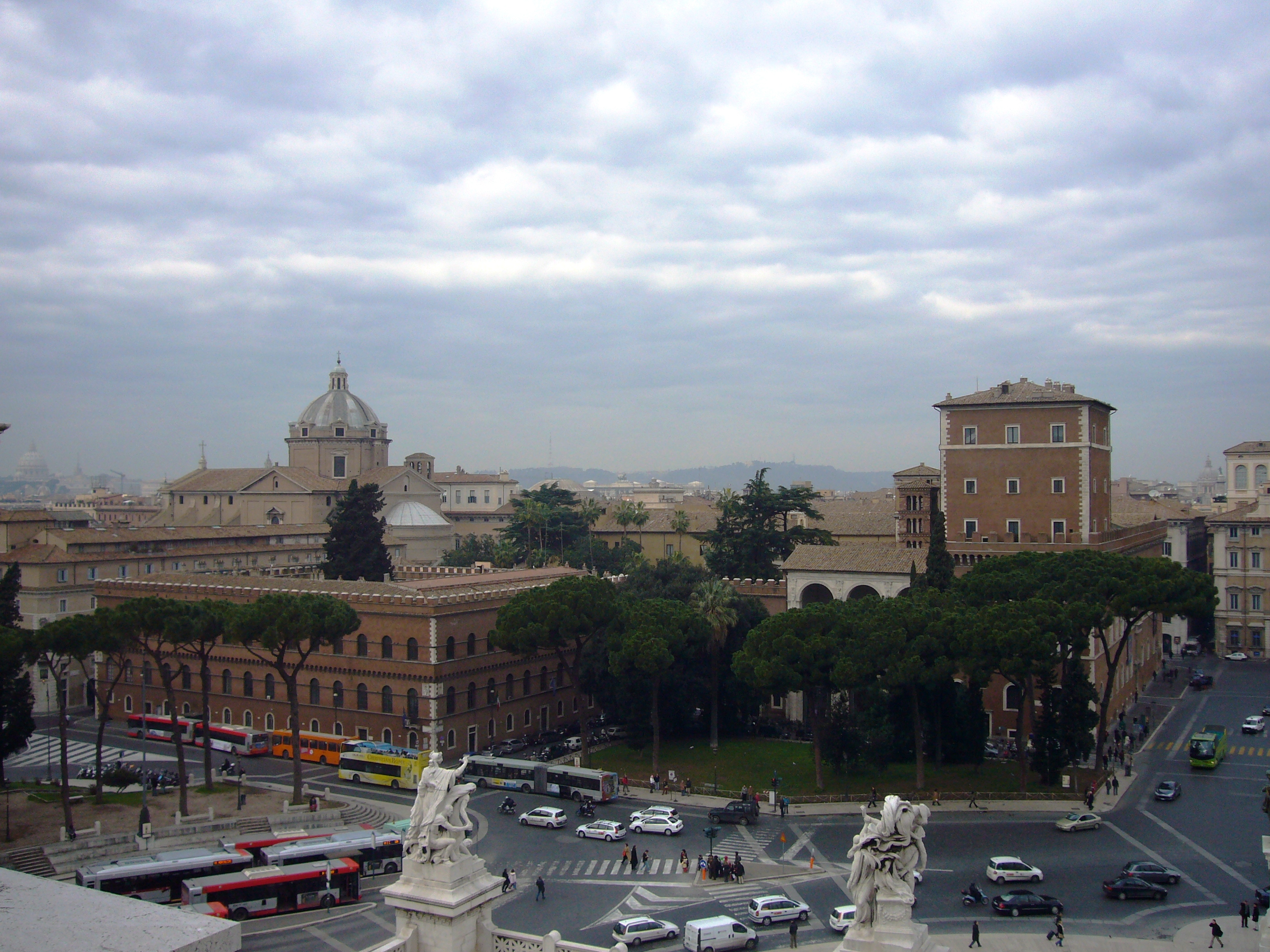
The Torre della Biscia ("Biscia Tower") of Palazzo Venezia rises above the pines in Piazza di San Marco; adjoining the tower at left is the Travertine marble two-storied loggia covering the original south facade and main entrance to the Basilica of Saint Mark the Evangelist. View from the south-east, from the Victor Emmanuel II Monument on the Capitoline Hill, approximately the position of the Tower of Paul III (demolished in 1886). The Palazzetto is at left, having been moved 100 metres from its original position to the right of, and directly in front of, the Biscia Tower in 1910; the dome on the left is of the Church of the Most Holy Name of Jesus.

=== Pope Paul II ===
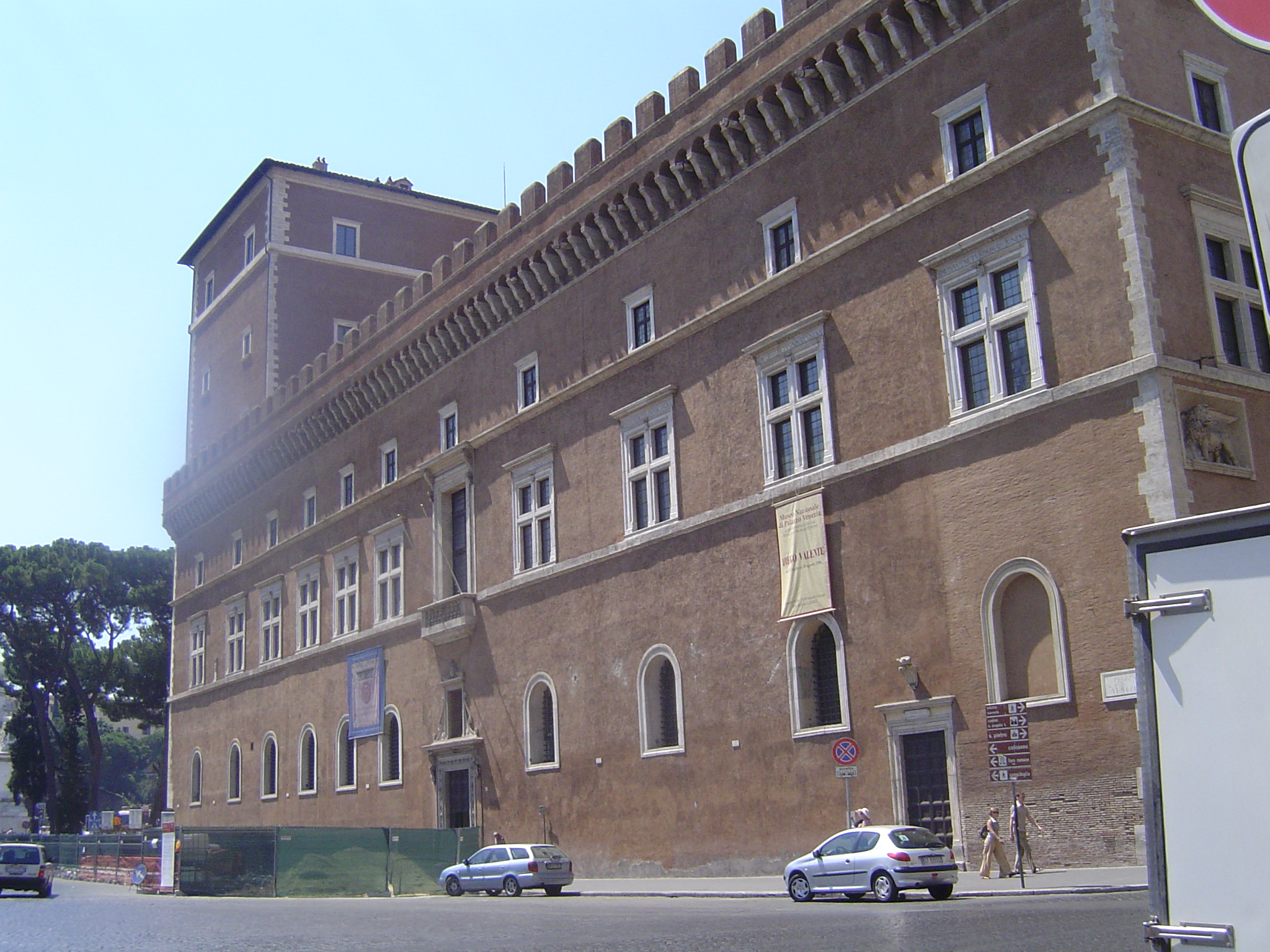
East facade, facing Piazza Venezia, as rebuilt in 1450s by Pope Paul II

It was rebuilt in 1451 when owned by Cardinal Pietro Barbo (1417–1471) who from 1464 ruled as Pope Paul II (1464–1471), a nephew of Pope Eugenius IV. It became a fortified building, composed of a half-basement and a mezzanine which functioned as a piano nobile. In 1455, Pietro Barbo had a commemorative medal struck to mark its construction. The building manifested some of the first Renaissance architectural features in Rome although the overall aspect is of a massive, fortified medieval structure with battlemented parapet. On its west side it adjoins the ancient Basilica of Saint Mark, which is aligned south to north, founded by Pope Marcus in 336 and dedicated to Mark the Evangelist who would become protector of Venice, completely rebuilt in 833, and which underwent frequent reconstructions since then. Much of the stone to build the Palazzo was quarried from the nearby Colosseum, a common practice in Rome until the 18th century. The design is traditionally attributed to Leone Battista Alberti.

==== Palazzetto ====
Between 1466–1469, Pope Paul II added at the south-east corner a large square three storied cloister enclosing a garden, which structure was known as the Viridarium ("Green Area") or Palazzetto ("Little Palace"). The building was completed after the pope's death in 1471 by his nephew Marco Barbo, Patriarch of Aquileia. This structure was demolished in 1910 and rebuilt on a similar scale and reusing many original materials, 100 metres to the west to fit in with the construction of the massive Victor Emmanuel II Monument on the Capitoline Hill, scheduled for completion in 1911.

==== Biscia Tower ====
The large square tower above the south end of the main block was built in 1470, and encloses a more modest mediaeval predecessor. It is known as the Torre della Biscia ("Biscia Tower"), possibly after the form of an ancient piece of sculpture enclosed within the masonry, or as the Torre di Carlo Muto ("Tower of Carlo Muto"), after the owner of the land purchased by Pietro Barbo.

=== Pope Paul III ===
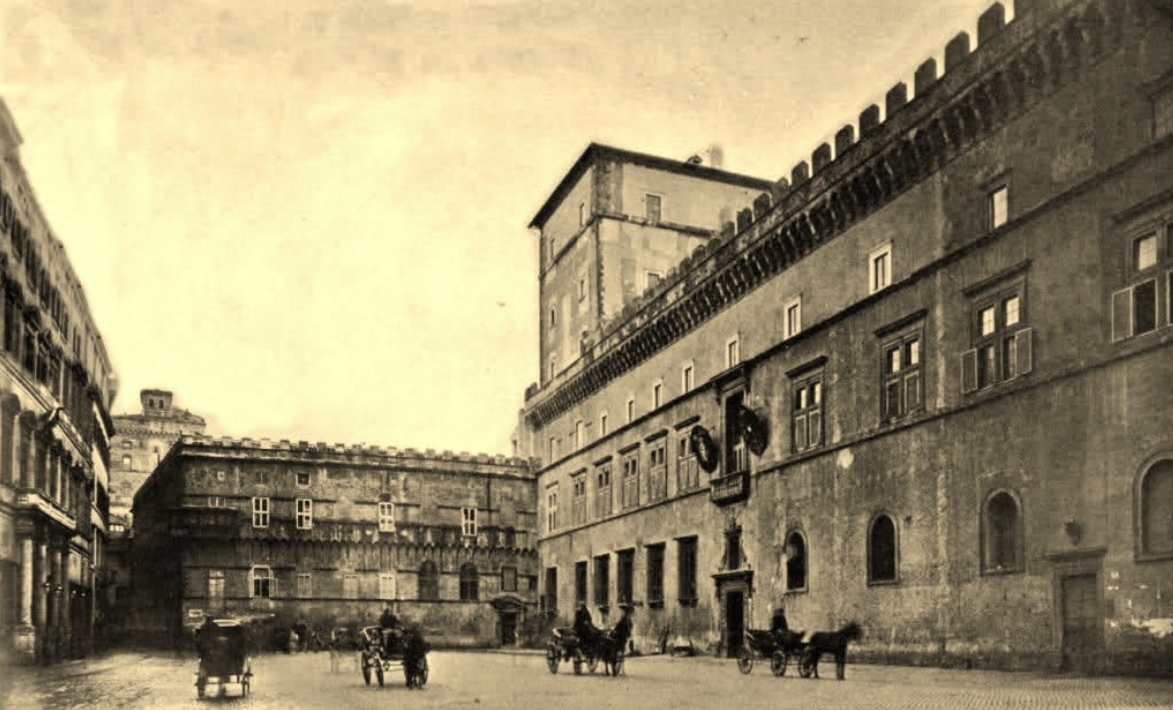
Palazzo Venezia before 1886, with buildings arranged largely as in the time of Pope Paul III, view from north: right: east facade of Palazzo San Marco: centre: the Palazzetto (demolished in 1910); background, left: Tower of Paul III (demolished in 1886) on Capitoline Hill, connected by a covered arched viaduct to the top floor of the Palazzetto.

During the triumphal return of the Holy Roman Emperor and titular King of Italy Charles V from the Conquest of Tunis in 1535, Pope Paul III (Alessandro Farnese) (1468–1549, ruled as pope between 1534–1549) made substantial use of Palazzo San Marco as a papal residence. In 1536, he invited Charles V to meet him in Palazzo San Marco for discussions concerning holding an ecumenical council of the Roman Catholic Church, in order to formulate a Roman Catholic response to the Protestant Reformation, which eventually resulted in the Council of Trent in 1545. "The pope received Charles V with all honours" and the meeting concluded successfully and "resulted in the publication of a papal bull calling all patriarchs, archbishops, bishops, and abbots to assemble at Mantua on 23 May 1537, for a general council". To welcome the Emperor, a triumphal arch was built at the north-east corner of Palazzo Venezia, to the design of Antonio da Sangallo the Younger (1484–1546).

Paul III built a "mighty defensive tower, known as the Tower of Paul III" on the Capitoline Hill, "an imposing construction through which (he) could literally oversee the whole of the City" (demolished in 1886). In order to reach this securely and privately, he built a viaduct (known as the Arch of Saint Mark, or Passetto) from the tower to the top floor of the south-east corner of the Palazzetto, "replicating the palace-passageway-fortress system" which links the Vatican and Castel Sant'Angelo. Subsequently he reconstructed the Capitoline Hill itself, which had become "a ramshackle collection of faded buildings and a place of executions", to the design of Michelangelo.

=== Pope Pius IV ===
In 1564, Pope Pius IV gave use of much of the building to the Republic of Venice for its embassy and for the titular cardinal of the Basilica of Saint Mark, by tradition always a Venetian.

=== Later history ===
Palazzo Venezia (pre-1886 diagram)

Palazzo Venezia (post-1911 diagram)

Following the Treaty of Campoformio (1797), when Austria succeeded the defunct Venetian Republic, the palace came into the possession of the Austrian Empire, and served as the seat for the Austrian ambassador to the Vatican until 1916, when the Kingdom of Italy, at war with Austria-Hungary, seized the building.

During the first half of the 20th century it became the residence and headquarters of Benito Mussolini, dictator of Fascist Italy (1922–1943), who made notable orations from its balcony to huge crowds filling the Piazza Venezia. From the balcony of the palace he addressed the crowd on many occasions, for example after the Italian Fascist invasion of Ethiopia (1935–1937) and Albania (1939), and Fascist Italy's entry into the Second World War alongside Nazi Germany (1940). He undertook large-scale works to renovate the top floor into private apartments, setting up housekeeping for his wife Rachele Mussolini, his children, and his mistress Clara Petacci.

On the advice of Achille Starace, Mussolini as a rule left the lights on in his office over night in order to cultivate an image of a workaholic totally dedicated to official business—"a man who never sleeps", as repeated by the Fascist propaganda. It was at Palazzo Venezia, in the Stanza del Pappagallo ("Hall of the Parrot") where the Italian Fascist regime came to an end: a palace coup setting forth Count Grandi's Order of the Day on 24–25 July 1943, demanding Mussolini's powers be taken away by the Italian King, Victor Emmanuel III. The vote by the Grand Council of Fascism left Mussolini in the minority, which enabled the King to dismiss Mussolini and arrest him.

== Present ==
The "Museo nazionale del Palazzo di Venezia", housed in the building, contains galleries of art, predominantly pottery, tapestry, statuary from the early Christian era up to early Renaissance.

In 1910, due to the erection of the Victor Emmanuel II Monument, the Italian Government enlarged the Piazza Venezia and built a replica of the Palazzo Venezia in yellow brick on the opposite side of the square. This building hosts now the offices of the Assiscurazioni Generali di Venezia. Also because of that the "Palazzetto di Venezia", which closed the south side of the Piazza, was dismantled and rebuilt southwest of the Palazzo.

In late 2010 Mussolini's unfinished "most secret" bunker was discovered beneath the building.

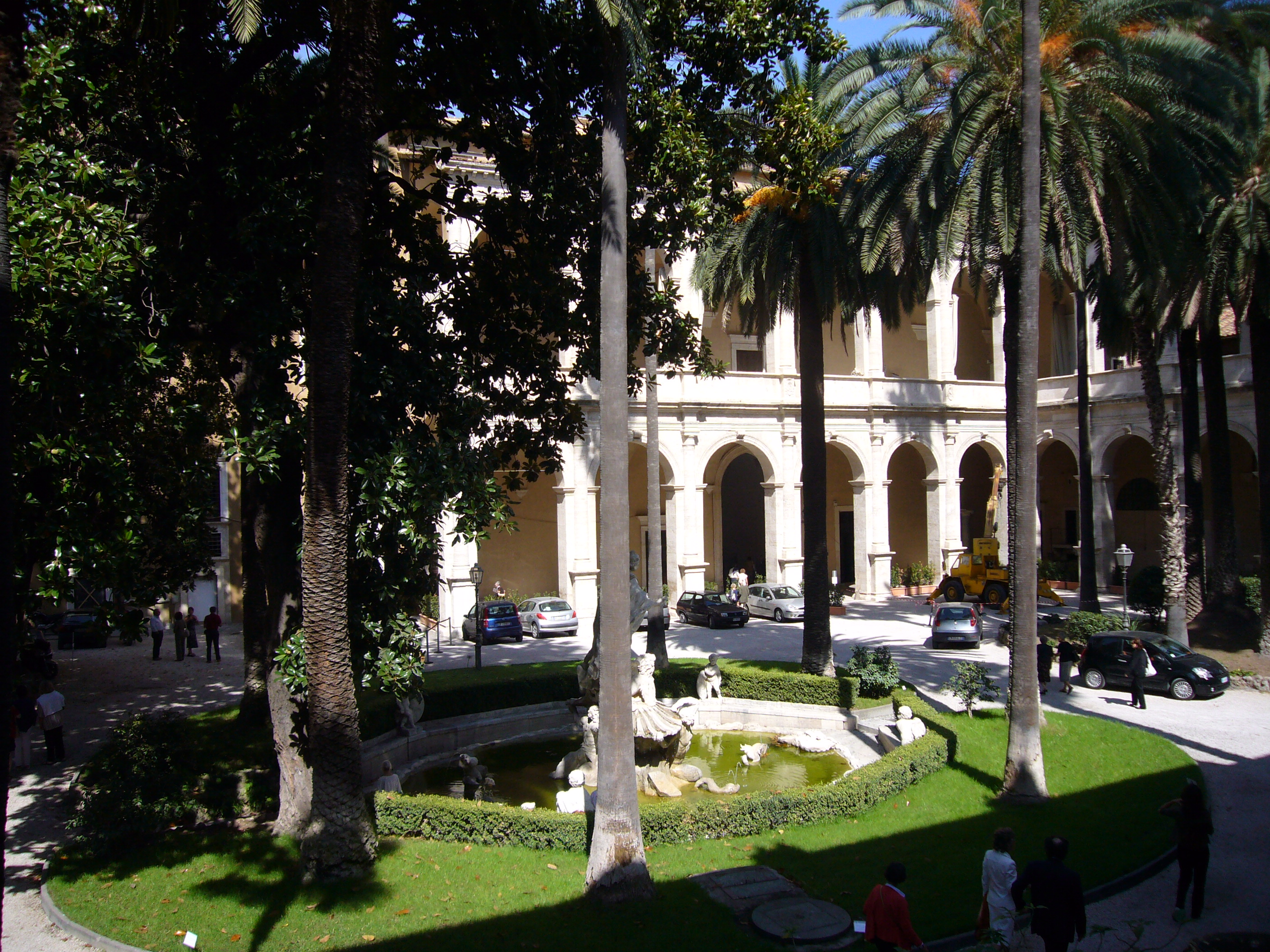
Palazzo Venezia cortile grande

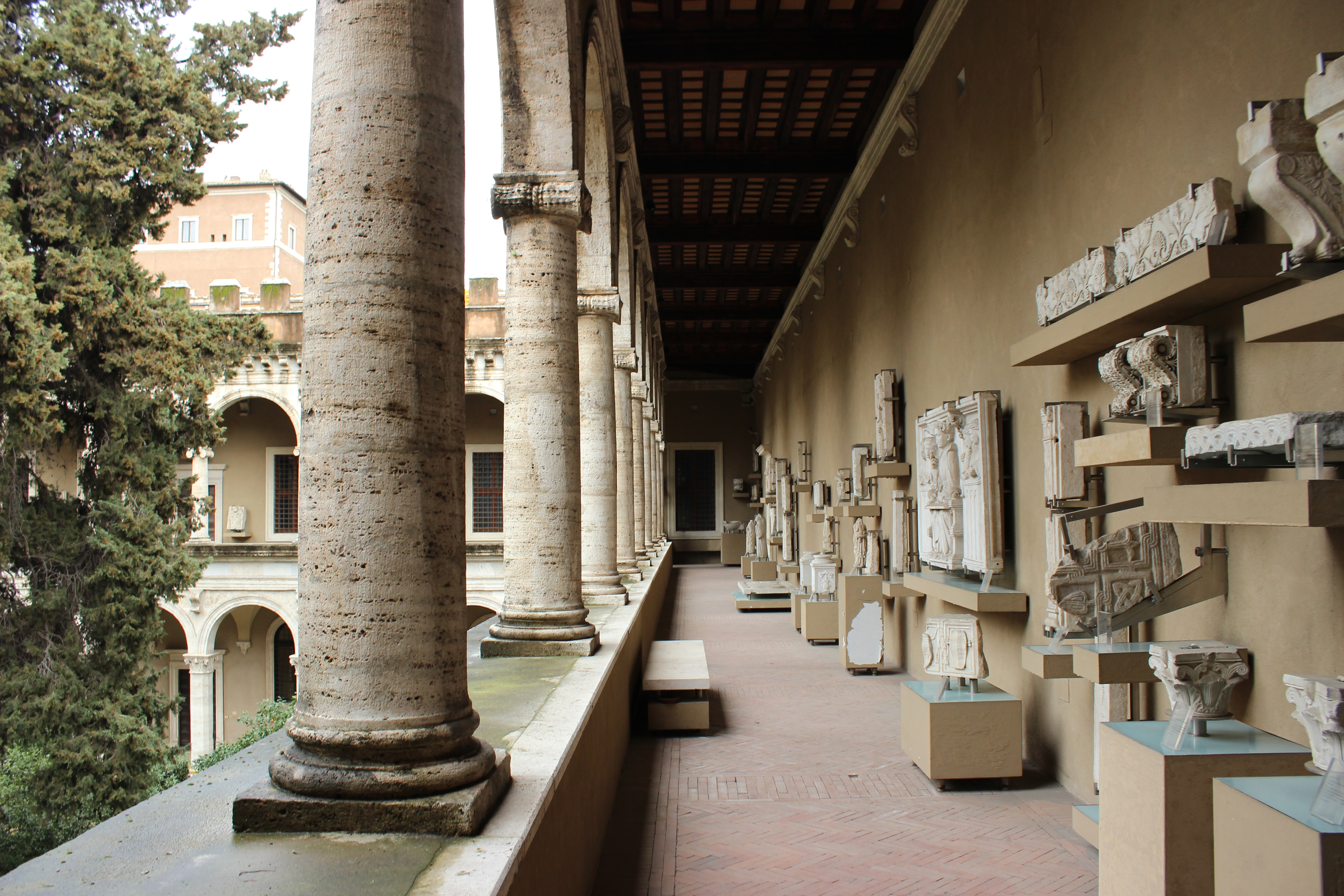
Palazzo Venezia Roma

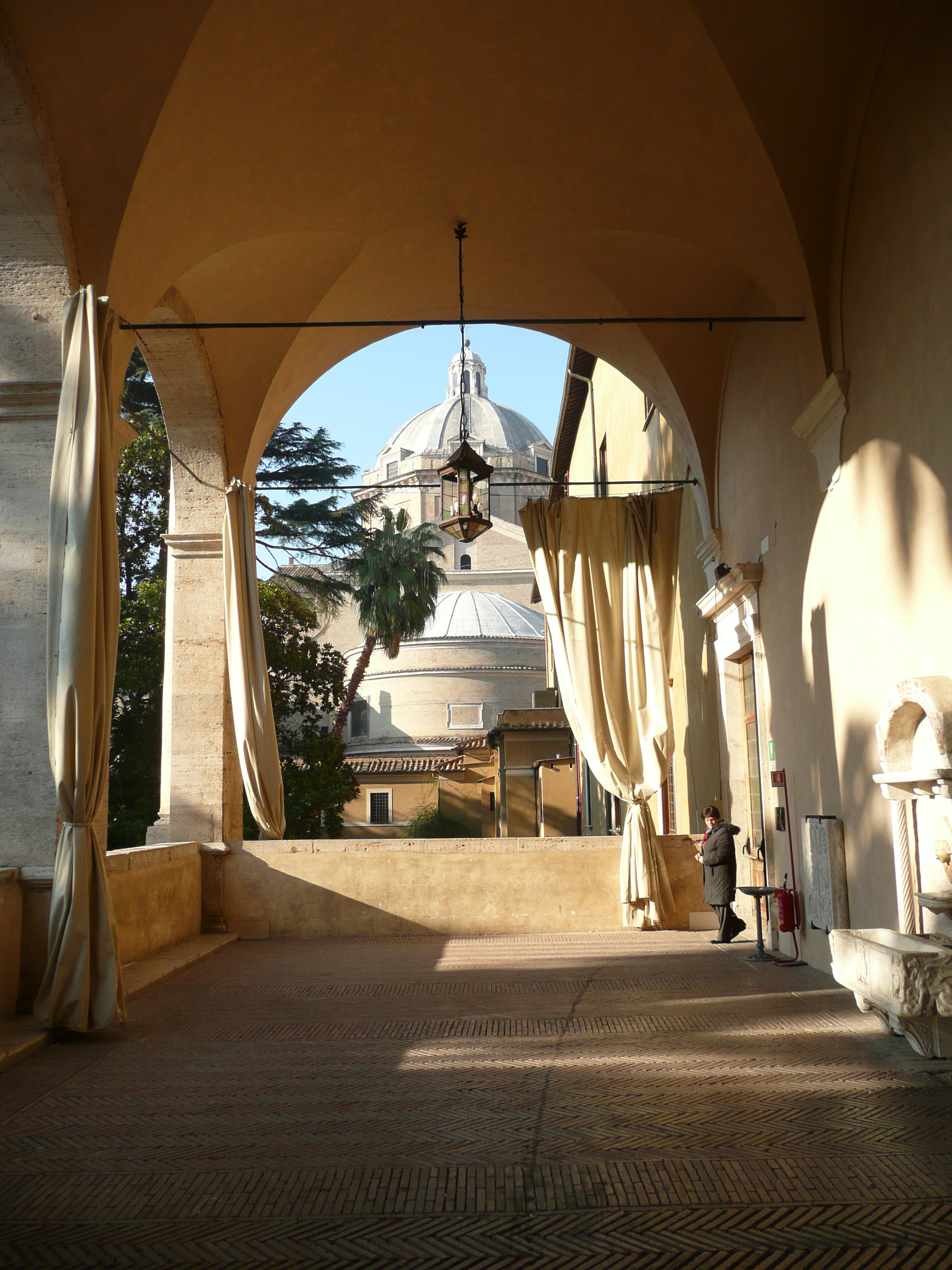
Palazzo Venezia loggia

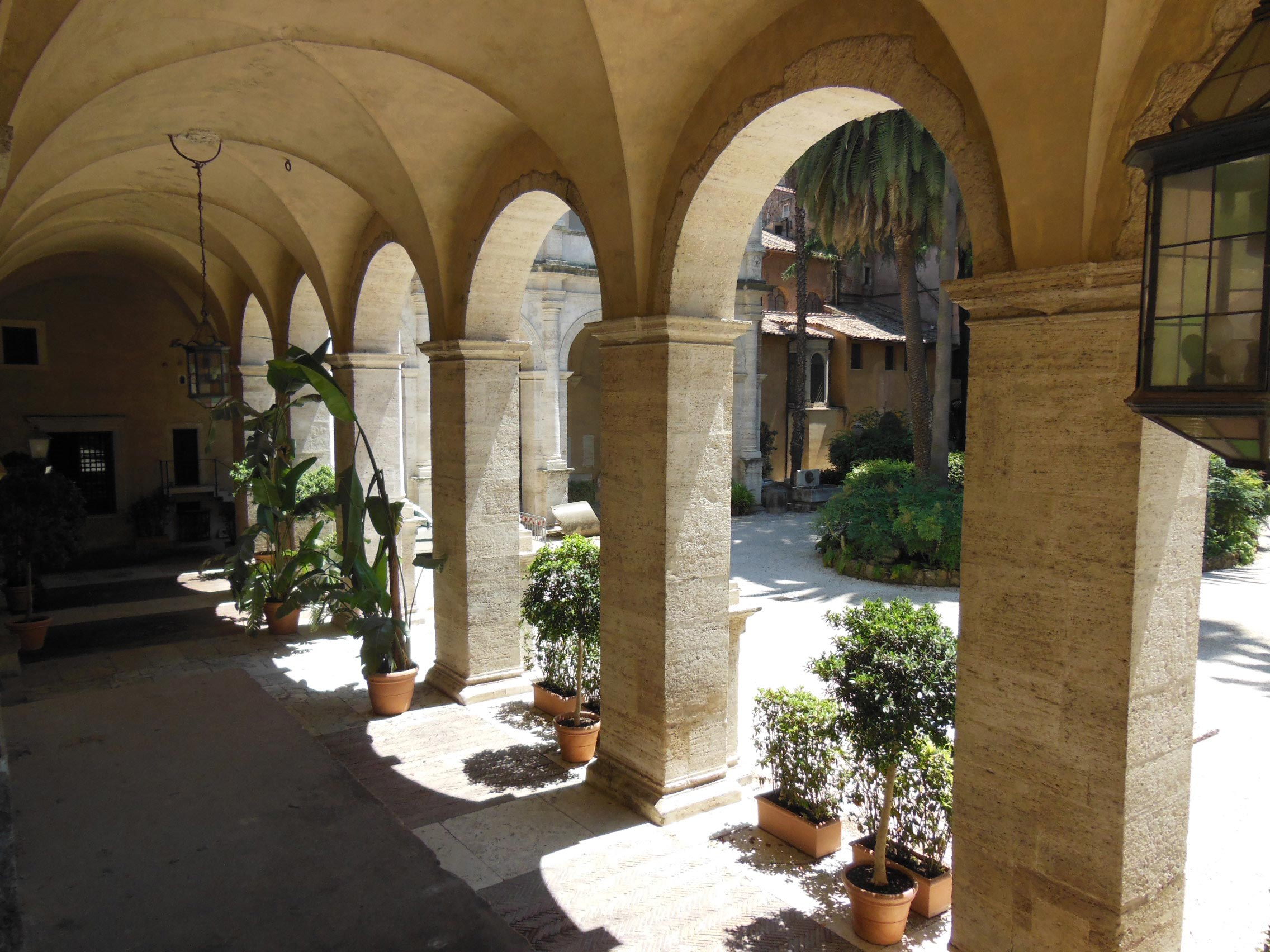
Portico

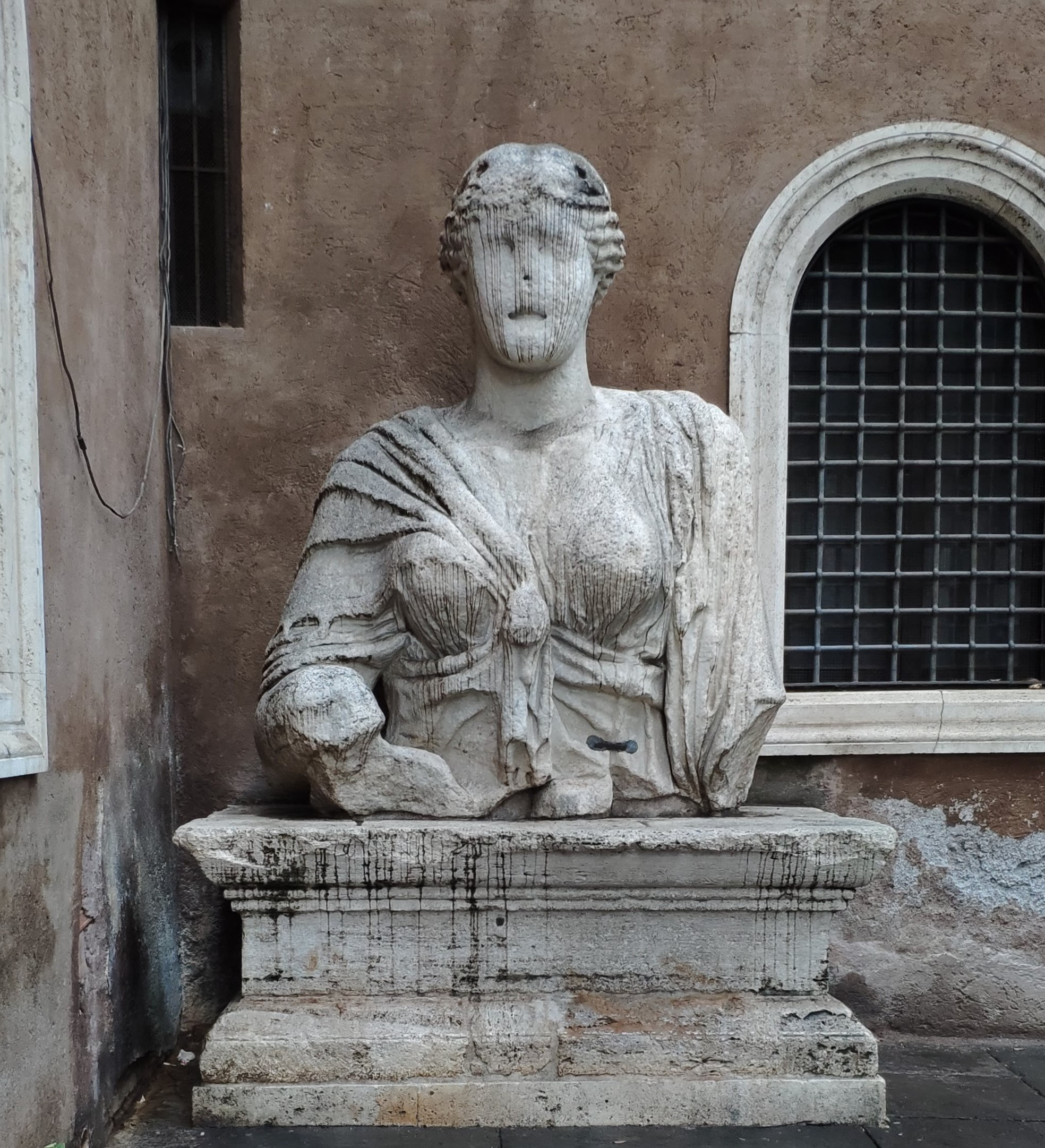
Bust of Isis or 'Madama Lucrezia'

== Sources ==
- Carlo, Cresti; Claudio Rendina; Massimo Listri (1998). Palazzi of Rome. Könemann. pp. 58–65.
