= Funerary monument for an athlete =

Ancient Greek stele

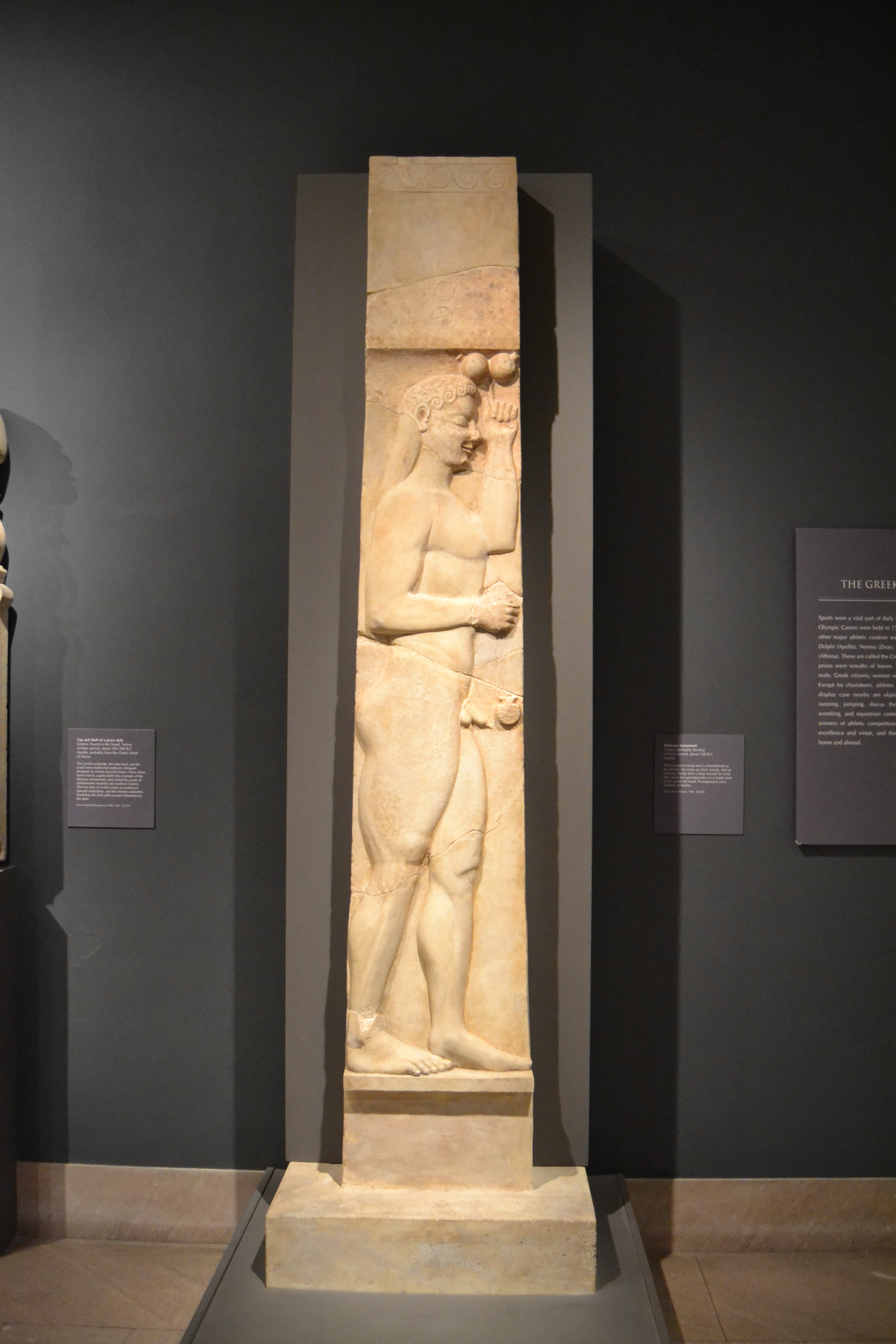
The stele in the Museum of Fine Arts, Boston.

The Funerary monument for an athlete is an Ancient Greek relief that depicts a young nude male holding two pomegranates over his head in his left hand, and an aryballos (a flask for perfume and oils) in the other. He stands facing right in profile to the viewer, with one foot stepping out in front of the other. The relief is 98 x 24 3/4 x 9 3/4 inches and is carved in marble.

== Context ==
The statue is rendered in the regional sculptural style of Boeotia, which favored representing lean, muscular young men, as opposed to the fleshy, rounded males depicted in contemporary eastern Greece. The relief borrows heavily from kouros sculpture. Like kouroi, the relief was used as a grave marker depicting a generalized image of an attractive youth. The subject also sports the archaic smile typical of kouros statuary.

== Provenance ==
This funerary stele is part of the Ancient World collection in the Museum of Fine Arts, Boston. It was acquired in Thebes by Edward Perry Warren in 1900 and donated to the Museum of Fine Arts on May 28, 1908. It was originally found in Boiotia, Greece.

== See also ==
Other ancient Greek funerary reliefs:

- Stele of Aristion
- Funerary naiskos of Demetria and Pamphile
- Grave stele of Hegeso
