= Mosaic of Dominus Julius, Carthage =

4th c. mosaic in Roman Carthage

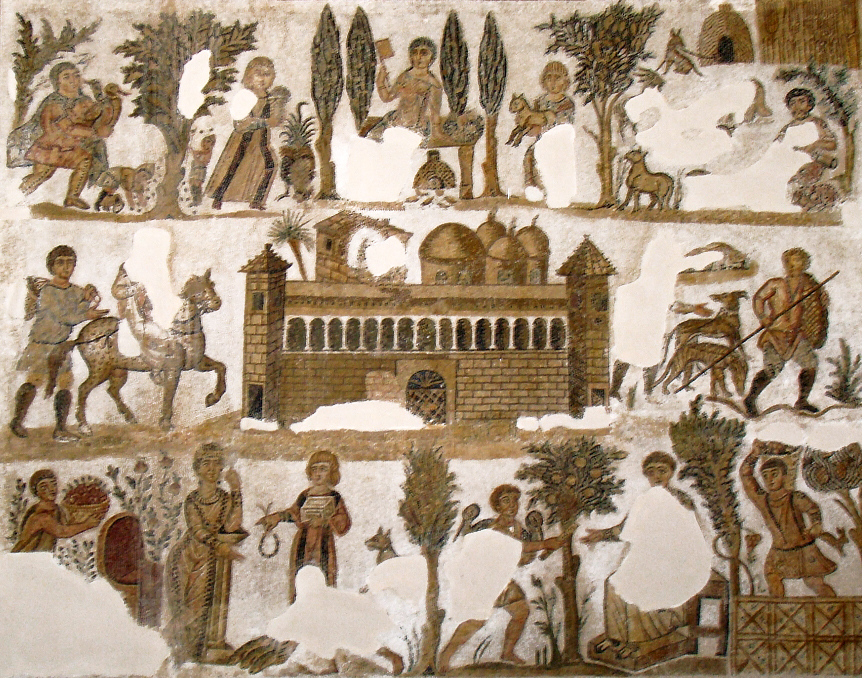
Mosaic of Dominus Julius, Carthage (now in the Bardo Museum)

The Mosaic of Dominus Julius is a late fourth-century or early fifth-century floor mosaic that was put into in the estate of Dominus Julius in Carthage. This mosaic is a reflection of daily life and an explicit communication of the status and wealth of the owners, and what their life consisted of. It is composed of three registers (levels), and focuses on an image of a dwelling in the center, surrounded by images of leisurely activities of the owners.

== First register ==
The first of the three registers is an image of a woman sitting and fanning herself. She is dressed in a simple gown that is draping off her shoulder, decorated with bracelets on each wrist, and being served olives, a duck, and a lamb by a servant of the estate. The garment that falls from her shoulder is a possible connection to the Venus Genitrix, the goddess of marriage and family. This focal point is surrounded by smaller images of figures picking olives from an olive tree. It is not fully known what the purpose of the woman is. She is perhaps the lord of the estate's wife, but may just be pictured as a symbolism of an elite woman's status.[3] Elite women were higher than slave women, but still considered lower-class citizens in comparison to men. This image of a woman being served acts as a statement that represents women, both slaves and the elite, in a positive manner.[1]

== Second register ==
The middle register pictures a man on horseback riding towards the estate's house, accompanied by a servant on foot. The central house is built of powerful walls, an arcade along the facade, and four domes representing the baths. This type of home would have been a luxurious country mansion. The right side of this register is of two figures with dogs going hunting.

== Third register ==
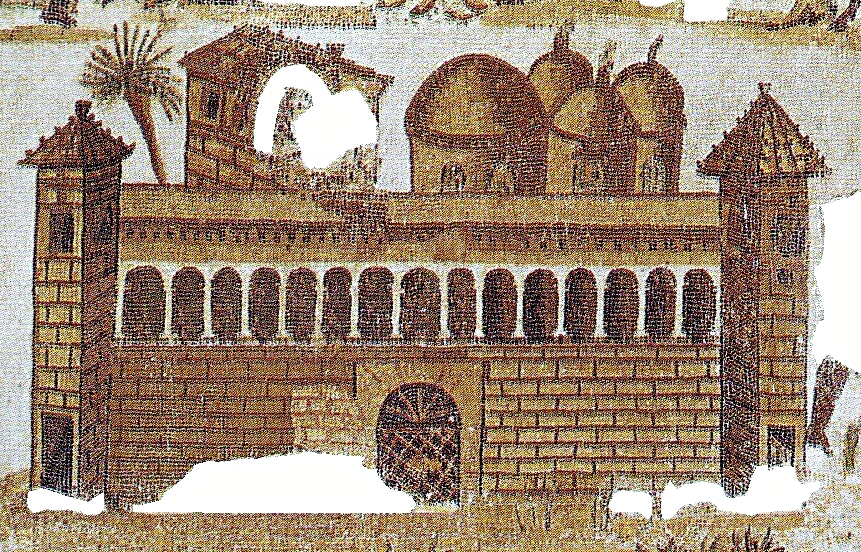
The estate central in the mosaic

The third register contains a woman leaning against a column, standing next to a chair that she has recently risen from. She holds a mirror, wears a fillet, earrings, and a dress with a jeweled neckline. A servant stands on her left carrying a basket of roses. Another is on his knees offering fish, and a female attendant gifts her a necklace. The image on the right end of the register is the master of the house lounging on a backless chair. A servant is bringing him grapes, a rabbit, and a message that reads "Julio Domino." Dominus means 'property owner' or "master', indicating his role in the estate, and more powerful position over the woman's more leisurely activities.

== Overview ==
This mosaic is part of the pre-Vandal invasion (c. 313–429) period of mosaics in Christian art at this time, and is purposed to reflect daily life and make a statement about the wealthy power of the elite. The mosaic as a whole is designed to display a picture of the great estate watched over by its master and mistress. The images of every season surrounding the estate represent the constant flow of lavish produced on the estate year round. This image communicates an ideal self image that aristocratic masters of an estate wanted to edify for themselves. The mosaic is very clear in communicating its message, both in the images it contains, and its placement in the home, where it would be seen by all masters, guests, and servants. It has since been removed from the home in Carthage, and is now kept at the Bardo Museum in Tunis.
