= Forum of Caesar =

Ancient Roman imperial forum in Rome

Forum of Caesar/Forum Iulium
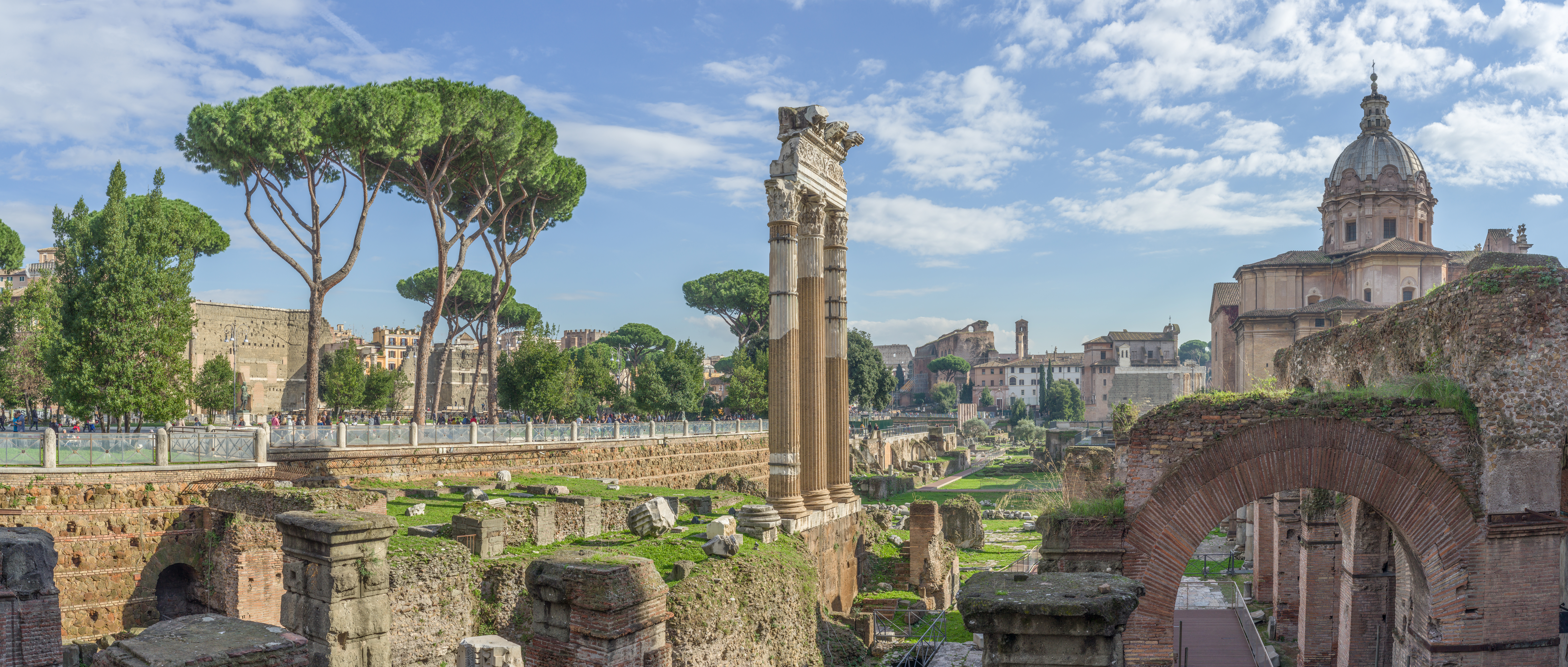
- The Forum of Caesar and the Temple of Venus Genetrix

- Shown within Augustan Rome
- Interactive map of Forum of Caesar/Forum Iulium
- 41°53′38″N 12°29′06″E
- Type: Imperial fora
- Location: Regio VIII Forum Romanum

History
- Built: 46 BC
- Built by: Gaius Julius Caesar

The Forum of Caesar, also known by the Latin Forum Iulium or Forum Julium, Forum Caesaris, was a forum built by Julius Caesar near the Forum Romanum in Rome in 46 BC.

== Construction ==
Caesar decided to construct a forum bearing his name in the northeast section of the Forum Romanum, and purchased some very expensive parcels of land in that area (the final cost was said to be 100,000,000 sesterces). Forum construction began probably in 51 BC, although Cicero and Gaius Oppius were entrusted with purchasing the parcels of land on Caesar's behalf as early as 54 BC. On the eve of the Battle of Pharsalus in 48, Caesar vowed a temple to Venus Victrix, the legendary progenitor of his own clan, the gens Iulia. This original dedication was done because she was Pompey's favourite goddess, and Caesar hoped to gain the goddess's favour before the battle against Pompey. Pompey was married to Caesars daughter Julia thus Venus being his favorite goddess. Julia died in giving birth to still born in 54 BC (aged c. 22)

The forum measured 160 x 75 m, stretching from the Argiletum on the southeast side of the Forum Romanum to the Atrium Libertatis. On completion in 46 BC it was dedicated to Caesar and his deeds. As part of the dedication, lavish games were funded by Caesar, indicating the staggering cost and thus the personal interest that Caesar had invested in the project.

Some believe that Augustus furnished the west side with the shops and offices therefore being the one to see its completion.

== Purpose ==
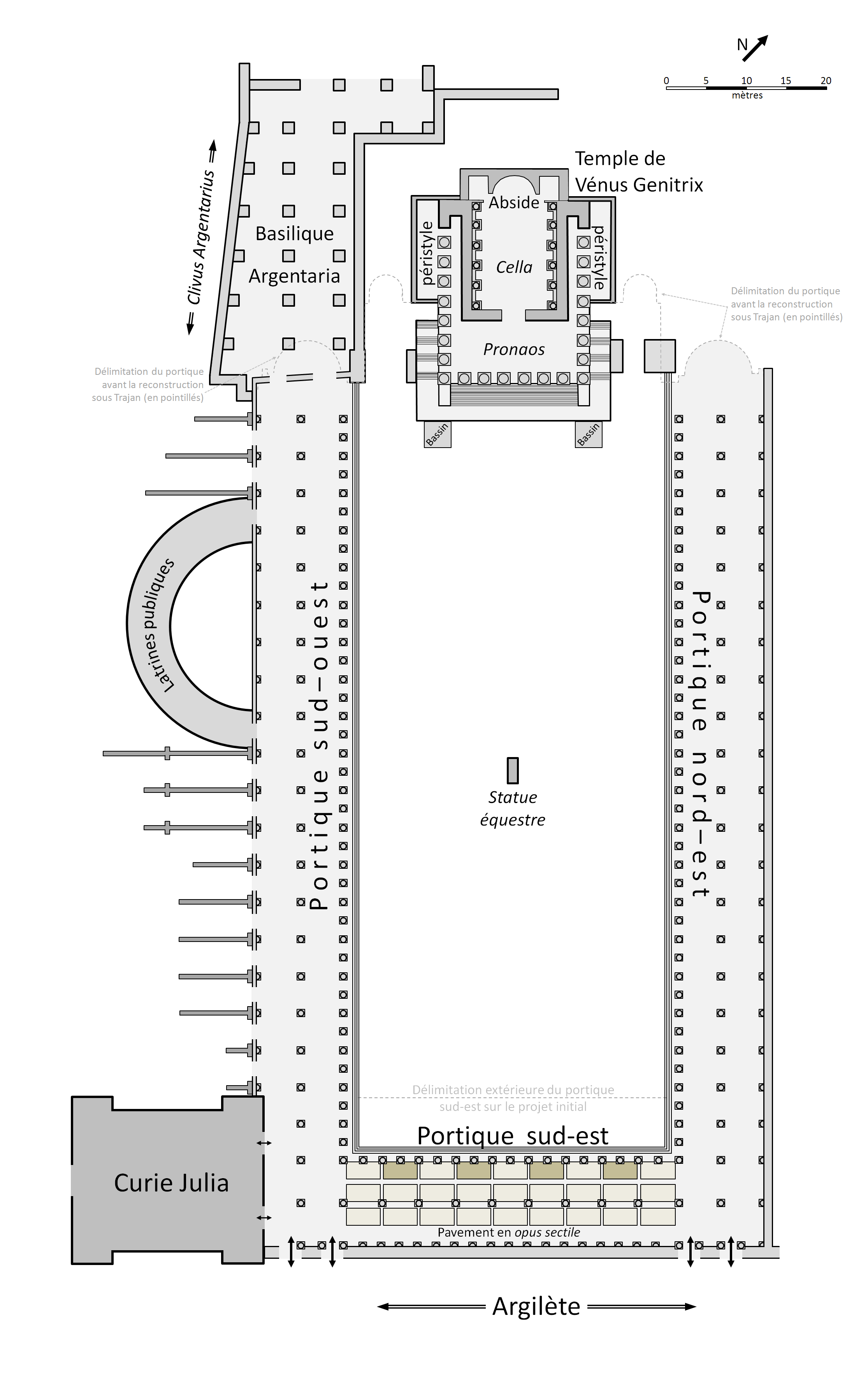
Plan of the Forum of Caesar

The Forum of Caesar originally meant an expansion of the Forum Romanum. The Forum, however, evolved so that it served two additional purposes. As Caesar became more and more involved in this project, the Forum became a place for public business that was related to the Senate in addition to a shrine for Caesar himself as well as Venus Genetrix.

Before his assassination, Caesar would have the Senate meet him before his temple, an act deemed very unpopular by the Senate. The Forum of Caesar also had an effect on the Curia, which Caesar began to reconstruct in 44 BC. This reconstruction moved the Forum of Caesar much closer to the Curia. The ten tabernae located on the western side of the Forum and its now close approximation to the Senate house symbolized the unity that Caesar felt between himself and the Senate.

Caesar also placed a statue of his favourite horse in front of the temple. Following his assassination, a statue of Caesar riding this horse was added. Caesar (gens Julia) claimed descent from Venus through his ancestor Julus. The Temple of Venus Genetrix was completed after Caesar's assassination by Roman senators, which included lavish games in reference to Caesar's original dedication of the Forum. The temple was re-built after the removal of the gap between the Capitoline Hill and the Quirinal Hill, under the reigns of Domitian and Trajan; during the adaptation of the gap, a second floor of tabernae was created behind the west portico of the square and a building with pillars made of tuff blocks, named Basilica Argentaria, was erected. The new temple was inaugurated in the same day as the Trajan's Column, on May 12, 113, as attested by an inscription in the Fasti Ostienses.

== Art ==
In the plaza of the forum, Caesar allowed a statue of himself wearing a cuirass to be set up, and also set up an equestrian statue of himself seated on a horse with feet carved like those of a human, according to Pliny the Elder. In the time of Hadrian, and perhaps earlier, a fountain with three basins connected by low walls was set in front of the temple, with a statue of the Empress Vibia Sabina placed on a base adjacent to it.

The Temple of Venus Genetrix contained an important collection of statues, paintings and engravings. The cult statue of Venus Genetrix was sculpted by Arcesilaüs. A gilded statue of Cleopatra VII was erected, setting a precedent for dedications to notable women in the precinct. Paintings in the forum included one of Medea, mythological Greek heroine of Euripides' play Medea, as well as one of Ajax, mythological Greek hero of Sophocles' Ajax, done by Timomachus. Perhaps more personal to Caesar were six collections of engraved gems. These surpassed in number the collection of Mithridates dedicated by Caesar's rival Pompey. It is not known where or how Caesar obtained these six collections.

Cassius Dio stated that Augustus also deposited a statue of Caesar with a star above his head in the temple, although some scholars believe this was confused with the Temple of Divus Julius in the Forum Romanum. Dio also stated that Caligula added a statue of his sister Drusilla inside the temple after her death. In the plaza, a statue of Tiberius was set up by fourteen cities of Asia Minor to honor the relief he sent them after earthquakes in 17 and 23 A.D.

== Reconstruction ==
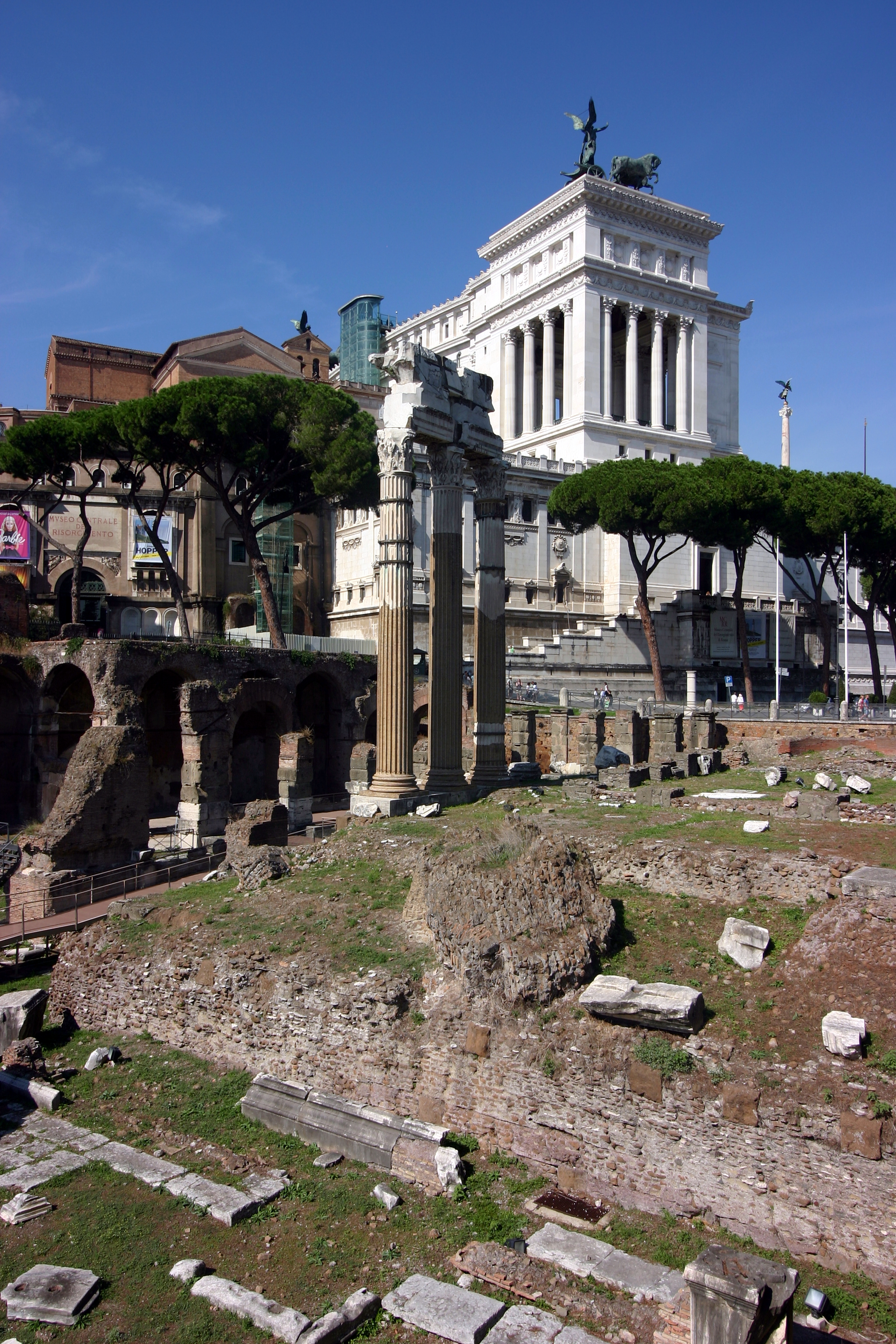
Forum of Caesar and the Temple of Venus Genetrix, with the Victor Emmanuel II Monument in the background

Following the reigns of Caesar and Augustus, a total reconstruction of the Forum took place, headed by the Roman Emperor Domitian. Why this reconstruction occurred is not exactly known. Under the reign of Titus, a massive fire ravaged the city in AD 80, including the Forum Romanum. The Forum of Caesar was not rebuilt until AD 95, however, indicating that perhaps Domitian had a personal interest in the reconstruction. This could be seen in the separation of the Curia from the Forum, symbolizing a reversal of Caesar's wish to have the Senate closely connected with him. Not much senatorial business took place in the Forum afterwards, except for the secretarium senatus in the 4th century. Diocletian restored the forum after a fire in 283 A.D.

In the sixteenth century, excavations unearthed the travertine and tufa foundations of the Temple of Venus Genetrix, as well as remains of columns and frieze. Andrea Palladio and Antonio Labacco made illustrations of these remains, peripteral octastyle in design.

In late May 2006, a team of archaeologists under the direction of Anna de Santis and Paola Catalano unearthed an inhumation tomb dating from the 10th century BC in the Forum of Caesar, in comparison to the previous five cremation tombs unearthed there from July 1999 to April 2006.

== See also ==
- Forum of Nerva – Ancient Roman imperial forum in Rome
- Ancient Roman architecture
- Imperial fora
- Lady of the Forum
- List of ancient monuments in Rome

Preceded by Forum of Augustus	Landmarks of Rome; Forum of Caesar	Succeeded by Forum of Nerva
