= Atrium Libertatis =

Ancient Roman administrative structure in Rome

- Interactive map of Atrium Libertatis
- Cultures: Roman
- Location: Rome, Italy

History
- Built: 3rd century BC

The Atrium Libertatis (English: House of Freedom) was a multipurpose administrative structure in ancient Rome that primarily served as the seat of the censors' archive. It was located on the saddle that connected the Capitolium to the Quirinal Hill, a short distance from the Roman Forum.

Livy reports that the edifice already existed in 212 BC, when some hostages were kept there, and that it was built again by the censors of 194 BC.

A second complete reconstruction was promoted by Gaius Asinius Pollio starting from 39 BC, with the spoils gained from his victory over the Illyrians, perhaps continuing the project, already conceived by Caesar, to complete the Forum dedicated to himself and inaugurated in the space between the saddle where the Atrium Libertatis and the Roman Forum stood just a few years earlier. The monument was to be completed by 28 BC.

It was a large complex, which included the censors' archive, with the lists of citizens and the bronze tables with the maps of the ager publicus, two libraries and maybe a basilica (Basilica Asinia).

The sources recall the presence, inside the complex, of numerous works of art by famous sculptors, some of Neo-Attic taste, others in the more "baroque" style of the Anatolian schools: among them, the sculptural group with the "Supplice of Dirce" by the sculptors Apollonius and Tauriscus. Also mentioned are the Appiadi, the work of the sculptor Stephanos, to which Ovid refers in relation to the neighbor Temple of Venus Genetrix in the Forum of Caesar.

The building disappeared at the beginning of the 2nd century, since the mountain saddle on which it stood was flattened for the construction of the Trajan's Forum. Its functions were inherited by the building complex consisting of the Basilica Ulpia and the two libraries next to the Trajan's Column. In particular, the ceremony of slaves' manumission probably took place in one of the apses of the Basilica Ulpia.

In late Roman Empire, the name of Atrium Libertatis was also attributed to the Curia or to an area adjacent to it.

== Bibliography ==
- Filippo Coarelli, Guida archeologica di Roma, Verona, Arnoldo Mondadori Editore, 1984.
- Filippo Coarelli, s.v. Atrium Libertatis, in Eva Margareta Steinby (edited by), Lexicon Topographicum Urbis Romae, I, Rome 1993, pp. 133–135.
