= Lady of the Forum =

Hominin fossil

The Lady of the Forum or Queen of the Latins is the provisional nickname given to a perfectly preserved skeleton of possibly the wife of an early Latin tribal ruler from the 10th century BC, and discovered in 2006 beneath the Forum of Caesar by a team of archeologists directed by Roberto Meneghini, head of Rome's Department of Cultural Heritage.

The team uncovered what seems to be a sizeable 10th century BC necropolis under the forum. All the tombs contained urns with ashes of the dead, except that of the Lady of the Forum, who must therefore have enjoyed a special social status not to be incinerated. She was about 165 cm tall and 30 years of age when she died and was buried with her jewelry, including an amber necklace, bronze brooches used to pin her robe, and a ring-shaped bronze ornament to hold her hair.

The discovery indicates that Rome was inhabited well before the traditional founding of the city by Romulus and Remus in the 8th century BC by a sophisticated Bronze Age society.
