= Venus Genetrix (sculpture) =

Sculptural type

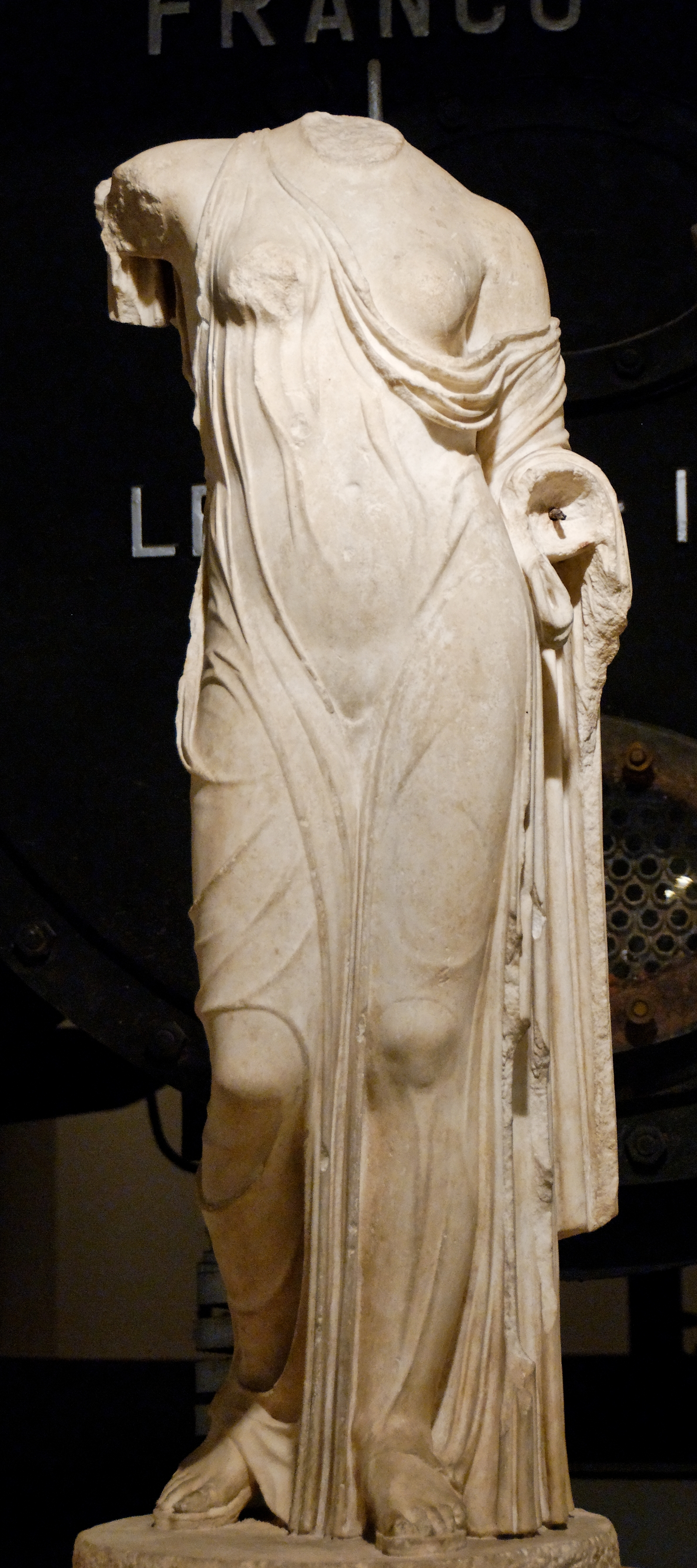
An example of Venus Genetrix (Capitoline Museums)

The Venus Genetrix (also spelled genitrix) is a sculptural type which shows the Roman goddess Venus in her aspect of Genetrix ("foundress of the family"), as she was honoured by the Julio-Claudian dynasty of Rome, which claimed her as their ancestor. Contemporary references identify the sculptor as a Greek named Arcesilaus. The statue was set up in Julius Caesar's new forum, probably as the cult statue in the cella of his temple of Venus Genetrix. Through this historical chance, a Roman designation is applied to an iconological type of Aphrodite that originated among the Greeks.

== History ==
On the night before the decisive battle of Pharsalus (48 BC), Julius Caesar vowed to dedicate a temple at Rome to Venus, supposed ancestor of his gens. In fulfilment of his vow he erected a temple of Venus Genetrix in the new forum he constructed. In establishing this new cult of Venus, Caesar was affirming the claim of his own gens to descent from the goddess, through Iulus, the son of Aeneas. It was in part to flatter this connection that Virgil wrote the Aeneid. His public cult expressed the unique standing of Caesar at the end of the Roman Republic and, in that sense, of a personal association expressed as public cult was the innovation in Roman religion.

Two types, represented in many Roman examples in marble, bronze, and terra cotta, contend among scholars for identification as representing the type of this draped Venus Genetrix. Besides the type described further below, is another, in which Venus carries an infant Eros on her shoulder.

== Original ==
In 420 - 410 BC, the Athenian sculptor Callimachus created a bronze sculpture of Aphrodite (now lost). It showed her dressed in a light but clinging chiton or peplos, which was lowered on the left shoulder to reveal her left breast and hung down in a sheer face and decoratively carved so as not to hide the outlines of the woman's body. Venus was depicted holding the apple won in the Judgement of Paris in her left hand, whilst her right hand moved to cover her head. From the lost bronze original are derived all surviving copies. The composition was frontal, the body's form monumental, and in the surviving Roman replicas its proportions are close to the Polyclitean canon.

=== Caesar's Venus Genetrix ===
The now-lost original statue, or Sabina in the same pose, is represented on the reverse of a denarius above the legend Veneri genetrici (‘to Venus Genetrix’), with Vibia Sabina on the obverse. The iconological type of the statue, of which there are numerous Roman marble copies and bronze reductions at every level of skill, was identified as Venus Genetrix (Venus Universal Mother) by Ennio Quirino Visconti in his catalogue of the papal collections in the Pio-Clementino Museum by comparison with this denarius. "From the inscription on the coins, from the similarity between the figure on the coins and the statue in the Louvre and from the fact that Arkesilaos established the type of Venus Genetrix as patron goddess of Rome, and ancestress of the Julian race, the identification was a very natural one." A Venus Genetrix in the Pio-Clementino Museum has been completed with a Roman portrait head of Sabina, on this basis.

== Other copies ==
A number of the Roman examples are in major collections, including the Centrale Montemartini (discovered in the Gardens of Maecenas), Detroit Institute of Arts, Metropolitan Museum of Art, the Royal Ontario Museum, the J. Paul Getty Museum, the Louvre Museum, and the Hermitage Museum.

=== Aphrodite of Fréjus ===
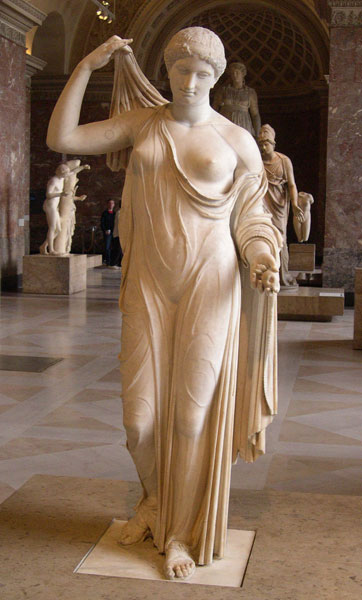
The Aphrodite of Fréjus at the Louvre

A 1.64 m-high Roman statue, dating from the end of the 1st century BC to the start of the 1st century AD, in Parian marble, was discovered at Fréjus (Forum Julii) in 1650. It is considered as the best Roman copy of the lost Greek work.

The neck, the left hand, the fingers of the right hand, the plinth, and many parts of the drape are modern restorations. It was present in the palace of the Tuileries in 1678, and was transported from there to the park of Versailles about 1685. It was seized in the Revolution, and has thus been in the Louvre since 1803, as Inventaire MR 367 (n° usuel Ma 525). The statue was restored in 1999 thanks to the patronage of FIMALAC.

=== Hermitage Museum ===
Another Roman copy of the statue, which is 2.14 m high, was in the collection of Giampietro Campana, marchese di Cavelli, Villa Campana, Rome, from which it was acquired for the Hermitage in 1861, following Campana's disgrace.

The head does not belong to this statue, which must originally have had a portrait head. In Rome, an ideal figure of a divinity might often be adapted slightly (here, for instance the chiton covers the breast) and given a separately made portrait head. Evidence that this was the case here can be seen in the locks of hair falling onto the shoulders. These are also seen in posthumous portraits of Agrippina the Elder, which enables us to date this statue to the second quarter of the 1st century AD.
