= Grave Stele of Hegeso =

Ancient Greek grave stele

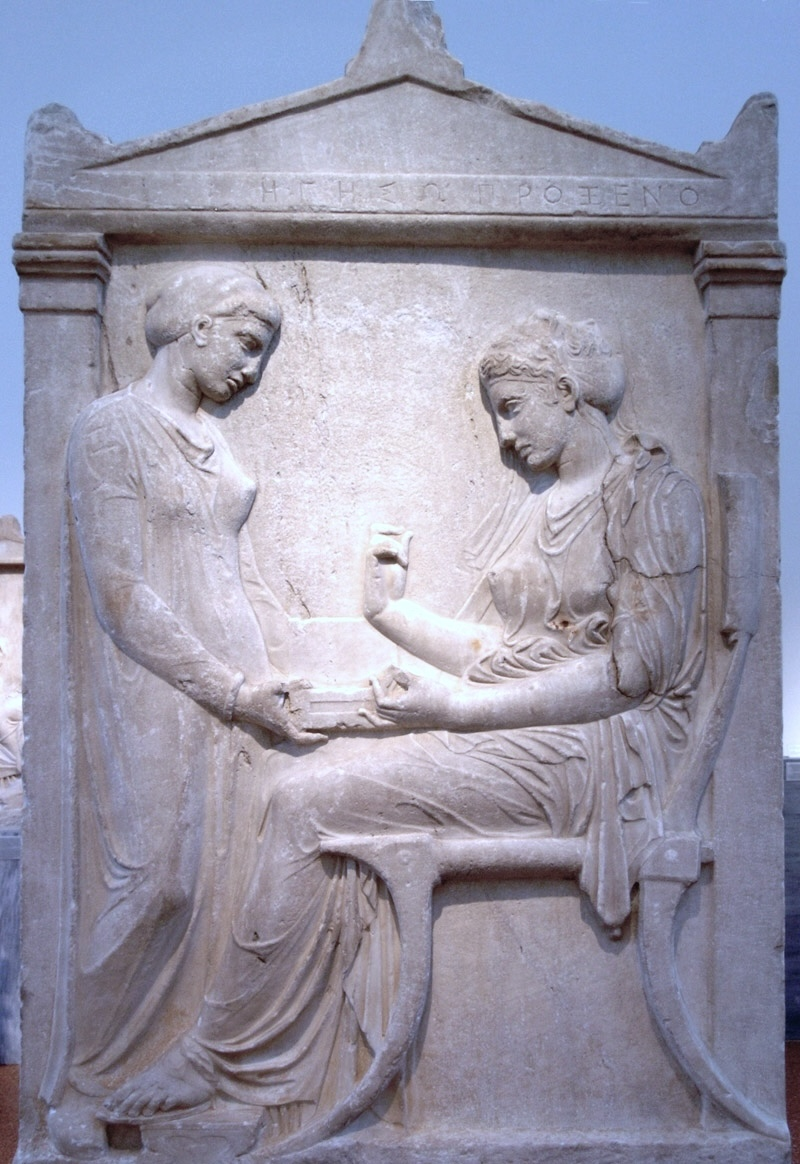
The Grave Stele of Hegeso (c.410–400 BC) is one of the best surviving examples of Attic grave stelae. From around 450, Athenian funerary monuments increasingly depicted women, as their civic importance increased.

The Grave Stele of Hegeso, most likely sculpted by Callimachus, is renowned as one of the finest Attic grave stelae surviving (mostly intact) today. Dated from c. 410 – c. 400 BCE, it is made entirely of Pentelic marble. It stands 1.49m high and 0.92m wide, in the form of a naiskos, with pilasters and a pediment featuring palmette acroteria. The relief, currently on display at the National Archaeological Museum in Athens (NAMA 3624) was found in 1870 in the Kerameikos in Athens, which now houses a replica of it.

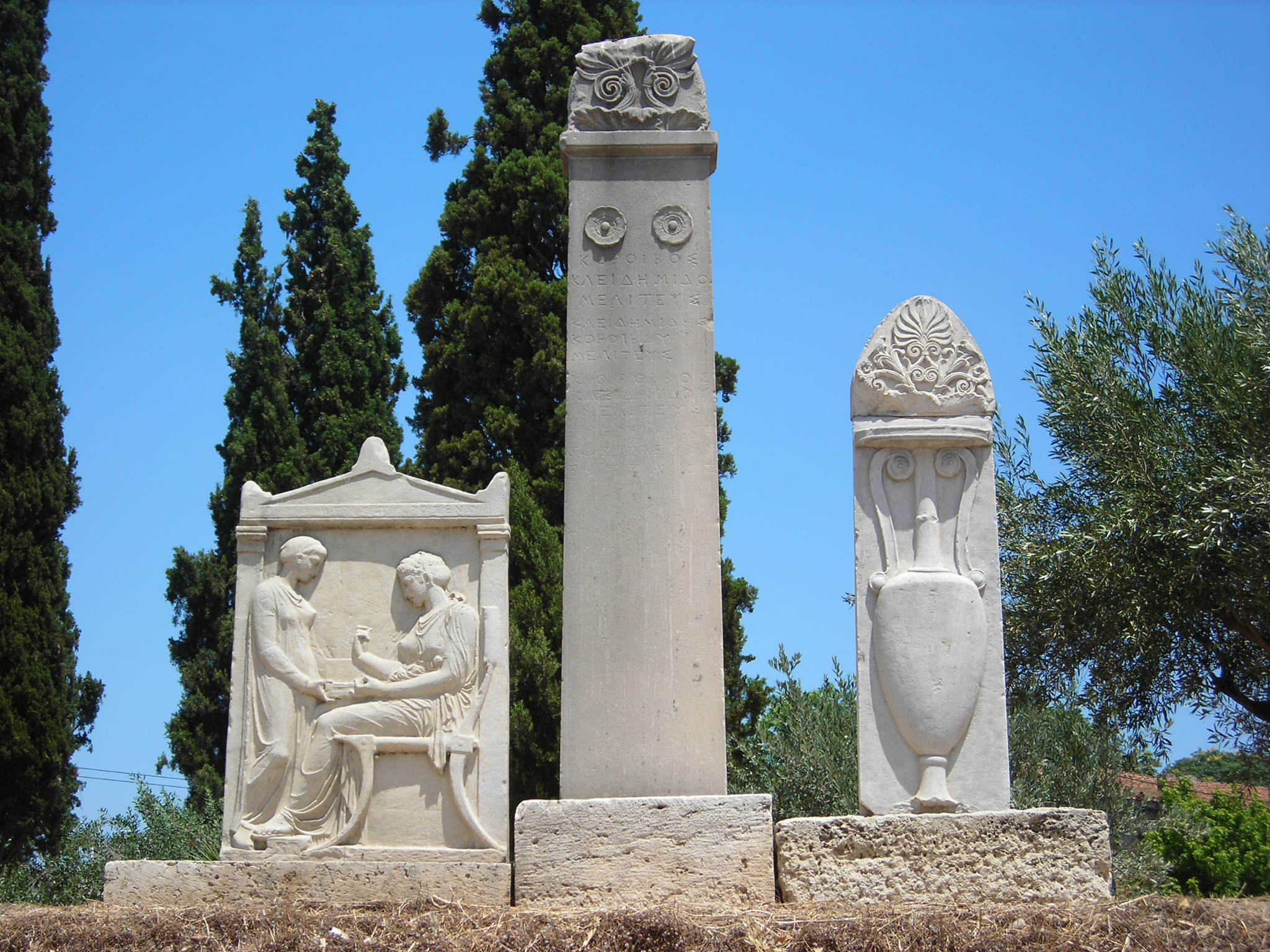
Modern replicas of the burial monuments for Hegeso, daughter of Proxenios, and for Koroibos.

In its current condition, it is almost complete, but has been restored around its edges. The plinth has mostly broken off and there is slight damage on the head of Hegeso.

The main shows a mature Athenian woman (Hegeso) wearing a chiton (costume) and himation, seated on a chair with her feet resting on an elaborate footstool. In her left hand, she holds an open cista, and in her right she holds a piece of (missing) jewelry that was originally painted, at which she is directing her gaze. Opposite her, on the left, stands a maidservant wearing a tunic and a headdress described as either a snood or sakkos. The maidservant is presenting the pyxis, on the knees of Hegeso. On the epistyle there is an epitaph, ΗΓΗΣΩ ΠΡΟΞΕΝΟ, stating that the deceased is Hegeso, daughter of Proxenios.

In general, stelae can be seen as a retrospective funerary art, that typically articulate a society's ideals of social living through their depiction of a domestic sphere. Compared to other non-civic art of the oikos (home), such as non-funerary red-figure painted pottery, stelae were obviously more fixed/permanent monuments, displayed outdoors for public viewing, and are constructed by a family for a specific person, making them far more expensive and exclusive than pottery. While their medium, context, and style associate stelae with the polis (city), their iconography is of the oikos. This paradox, as well as the prominence of women on gravestones, has led many scholars to focus on an analysis of the virtues designated to different genders on the stelae.

== The Keremeikos cemetery ==
During the early fifth century BCE, Athenians adopted a simpler style of tomb markers and there was a sharp decline in the amount of difference in wealth between individuals or families, reflected by grave goods. Around the beginning of the Peloponnesian War in 431 BCE, sculptors once again began creating more elaborate grave monuments, and graves became more differentiated by status and display. Periboloi, or family grave enclosures, were used more often in the fourth century to emphasize sentiments of democracy and family ideals/values. However, these ostentatious representations ended abruptly in 317, when Demetrios of Phaleron banned any more elaborate mausolea. A peribolos tomb has a high wall facing onto a road, which retains the earth fill piled behind it. The front wall is far higher than the three rubble walls surrounding the rectangular burial area, which contain the graves and provide space for family gatherings at funerals or other celebrations for the dead. Since people on the street could only view the front wall, families often created a facade of careful and elaborate masonry work, also shown in the reliefs of the funerary markers that would face the street in a row above, just behind the front wall. From the interior of the plot, one could only see the roughly cut backs of the stelae. Closterman has analyzed the iconography from classical Athenian tombstones within the peribolos plots, and found that these stelae most often do not focus on representing dead individuals, but rather display "the ideal roles of the family in the context of the civic world."

The monument of Hegeso would have been viewed within a peribolos tomb, facing the Street of Tombs on the left of the stele for Koroibos of Melite, a deme in the west of Athens. Though his rosette stele only lists Koroibos, his sons, and grandson (up to possibly five generations) in the inscription, most label Hegeso as the wife of Koroibos. The ambiguity in the inscription and depiction could also have been purposeful, so that Hegeso could memorialize not just one woman, but instead represent the qualities of all the unnamed wives of male descendants from the Koroibos stele. Since Athenians measured the level of public responsibility a citizen felt for the polis by his private actions, a citizen would feel motivated to create stelae in periboloi (like that of Hegeso) in order to convey persistent care for family members by displaying them together in a row, connecting numerous generations. Furthermore, the size and quality of Hegeso's stele indicate that her family was more wealthy and important than most.

== The relief ==
While Hegeso's relief may show a purely domestic scene, the virtues it honors may not have been solely for private consumption. Rather than simply celebrating the individual lives of certain women, the presence of stelae similar to that of Hegeso serve to define the female within a recognized social framework. From 450 BCE on, Athenian citizens (men) had a much greater vested interest in displaying his mother's status, in part due to the law by Pericles stating that any Athenian citizen needed to have a mother who was the daughter of another citizen. This law gave more importance to the child-bearing role of women (since their children would later select the gravestones) as well as the importance of marriage and familial relationships, since marrying non-Athenian women was so discouraged. While Pericles' citizenship law did not exactly change anything in terms of women's roles or freedoms, it codified their place in the hierarchy of the entire polis, which could be the underlying motive for Athenians during this time to represent such private, family virtues on publicly viewed stelae.

=== Hegeso ===
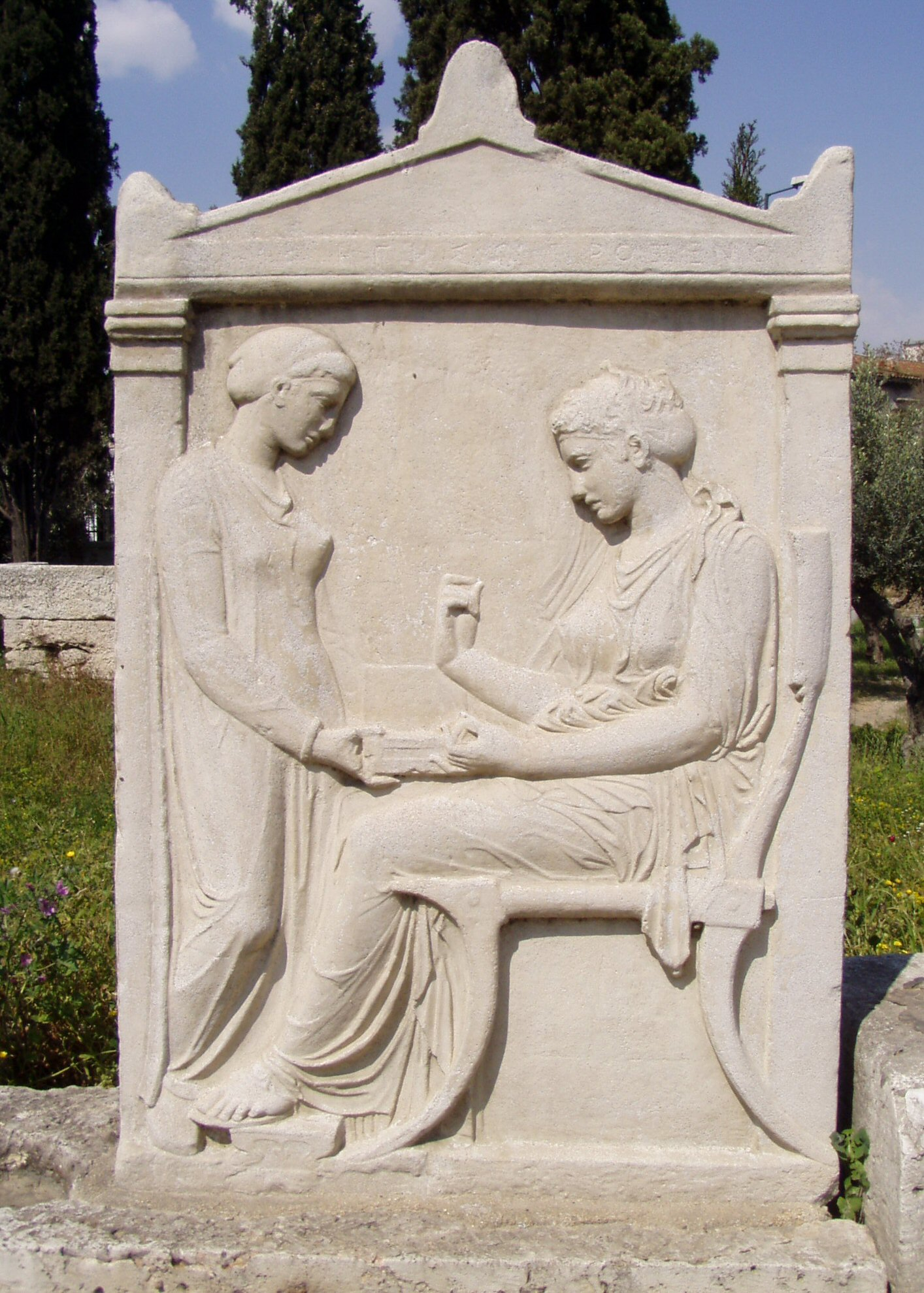
Close-up of the replica

==== Physical appearance ====
Hegeso's chiton and himation are transparent, but do not cling to her with any sort of erotic suggestiveness. She has short hair that is tied in a sakkos or snood. This elaborate hairstyle, drawing on a Pheidian model for Aphrodite, shows her superiority to her maidservant, who has a simpler hairstyle. Both Hegeso's clothing and hair emphasize her youthful beauty and sexuality.

==== Position ====
While the seated position of Hegeso was most likely intended to be a naturalistic depiction of a domestic setting, it actually refers to the widespread custom of ancestor worship, where a mortal who has died transforms into a lower-world god to his descendants. Thus, Hegeso could be seen as a goddess and her maidservant as an approaching worshipper with an offering of the pyxis. In other, similar reliefs, the heir is a servant of the past and could be worshipped in a variety of ways, whether with a pathetic procession, a crouching dog, or by a votive bird. The similarities of all of these images indicate a common theme of ancestor worship. However, the tradition has a Peloponnesian origin, which further suggests that the Athenian sculptor would not have intended any such analogy.

=== Maidservant ===
Hegeso's maidservant stands as a symbol of Hegeso's status and freedom, and the two are contrasted by how much more elaborate in style Hegeso's hair and clothing (with more folds) are. Long-sleeved chiton garments were not uncommon for servants in Greek sculpture or vase paintings. According to Barker, though, Hegeso's maidservant appears to be wearing two chitons together, one of which has a longer sleeve of finer texture and passes through the arm-size of the outer garment.

=== Objects ===
==== Furniture ====
Hegeso is seated on a klismos chair with slender elements, and places her sandalled feet on the delicate footstool in front of her. Footstools, especially ones shown as artistically as this, could be seen as a sign of rank in Ancient Greece. As Burton notes, the presence of chairs do not necessarily indicate a domestic setting, but definitely an interior one. However, coupled with the footstool, which further accentuates Hegeso's wealth, the furniture in the scene points to a domestic scene and seems to honor private virtues in the oikos.

==== Pyxis ====
The container Hegeso holds is of a type typically associated with women and weddings (as a gift for the bride).

==== Jewelry ====
Probably the most striking object in the relief is the item of jewelry that Hegeso appears to be pulling from the pyxis, since both she and her maidservant seem almost transfixed by it. The fact that it is missing now only makes one focus more on the empty space and wonder what it actually looked like or may have represented. However, the artist was most likely not attempting to draw attention to the piece of jewelry, but rather the act of adornment itself. He would have wanted to express a purely domestic scene of Hegeso, a typical Athenian lady, dressing to go out or receive guests (not to leave the household permanently in death, as one may want to sentimentally interpret it).

Obviously, the stele showing a woman adorning herself stands in contrast to those depicting scenes of women's industry. The adornment theme could be related to the dowry that a woman's father would need to provide her with in order to marry. In this way, the stele would demonstrate Hegeso's ability to contribute economically to her future oikos due to the nature of her attachment to her own family and its estate. Marriage is, after all, an important way for men to form links with each other within and outside of the polis. Therefore, an adornment scene would not only reflect a household's wealth and status, but would commemorate its ability to continue to help maintain the polis at large, in spite of individual death(s).

== Style ==
The quiet contemplation evident in the figures of Hegeso and her maidservant was common in all grave reliefs of the fifth century BCE. According to Mitchell, this "mere shadow of emotion" reflects absence of individuality and is reminiscent of the Parthenon frieze in its expression. The characters are noble and beautiful, but absorbed without affection for the object at which they direct their gaze (presumably a piece of jewelry). However, Buitron-Oliver notes that the highly idealized figures on the Parthenon frieze gave way to more realistic drapery around 400 BCE, as seen in the Hegeso relief. These new trends led to classical sculpture, in which a "severe style" was common. During this early classical period, sculptors and painters endowed their works with a feeling of seriousness in order to portray a sense of sophrosyne.

== References and sources ==
Sources

- Barker, A.W. (1924). The costume of the servant on the grave-relief of Hegeso. American Journal of Archaeology, 28(3), 290-292.
- Buitron-Oliver, D. (1992). The Greek Miracle: Classical Sculpture from the Dawn of the Democracy (the Fifth Century B.C.). Washington: The National Gallery of Art.
- Burton, D. (2003). Public memorials, private virtues: women on classical Athenian grave monuments. Mortality, 8(1), 20-35.
- Carpenter, R. (1950). Tradition and invention in Attic reliefs. American Journal of Archaeology, 54(4), 323-336.
- Closterman, W.E. (2007). Family ideology and family history: the function of funerary markers in Classical Attic peribolos tombs. American Journal of Archaeology, 111(4), 633-652.
- Kaltsas, N. (2002). Sculpture in the National Archaeological Museum, Athens. Los Angeles: Getty Publications.
- Leader, R.E. (1997). In death not divided: gender, family, and state on classical Athenian grave stelae. American Journal of Archaeology, 101(4), 683-699.
- Mitchell, L.M.W. (1905). A History of Ancient Sculpture. New York: Dodd, Mead, & Co.
- Verrall, M.G. & Harrison, J.E. (1890). Mythology & Monuments of Ancient Athens: Being a Translation of a Portion of the 'Attica' of Pausanias. London: Macmillan and Co.
- Whitley, J. (2001). The Archaeology of Ancient Greece. Cambridge: Cambridge University Press.
