= Temple of Venus Genetrix =

Roman temple (46 BCE)

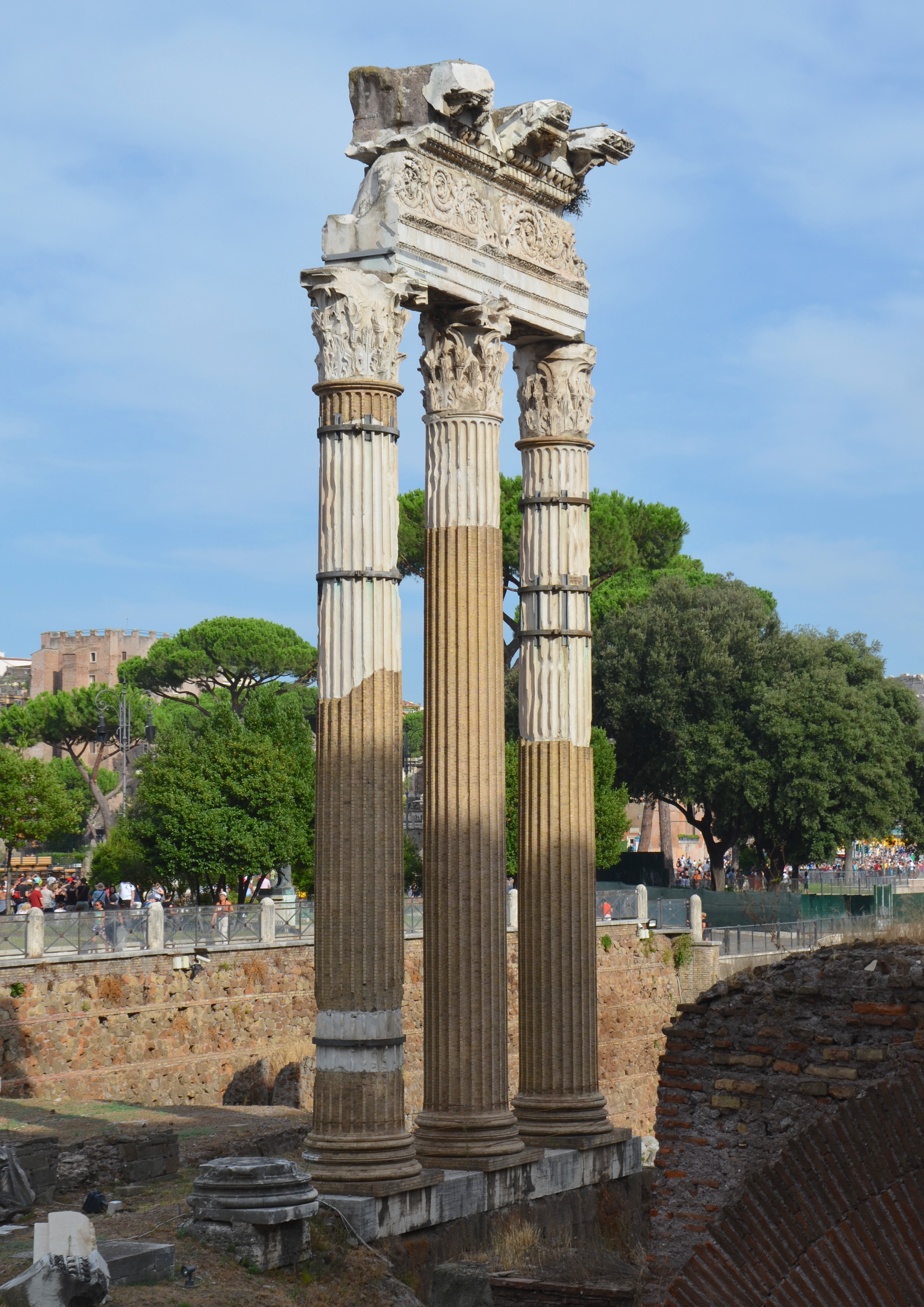
- Ruins of the Forum of Caesar

- Shown in ancient Rome
- Interactive map of Temple of Venus Genetrix
- 41°53′39″N 12°29′05″E

The Temple of Venus Genetrix (Latin: Templum Veneris Genetricis) is a ruined temple in the Forum of Caesar, Rome, dedicated to the Roman goddess Venus Genetrix, the founding goddess of the Julian gens. It was dedicated to the goddess on 26 September 46 BCE by Julius Caesar.

== History ==
The forum and temple were perhaps planned as early as 54 BCE, and construction began shortly thereafter.

On the eve of the Battle of Pharsalus, Caesar vowed the temple to Venus Victrix. He eventually decided to dedicate the temple to Venus Genetrix, the mother of Aeneas, and thus the mythical ancestress of the Julian family. The Temple was dedicated on 26 September 46 BCE, the last day of Caesar's triumph. The forum and temple were eventually completed by Octavian.

The area was damaged by the fire in 80 CE. Later the temple was rebuilt by Domitian and was restored and rededicated by Trajan on 12 May 113 CE. It was then burned again in 283 CE, and again restored, this time by Diocletian. The three columns now visible belong to this later reconstruction.

== Location and structure ==
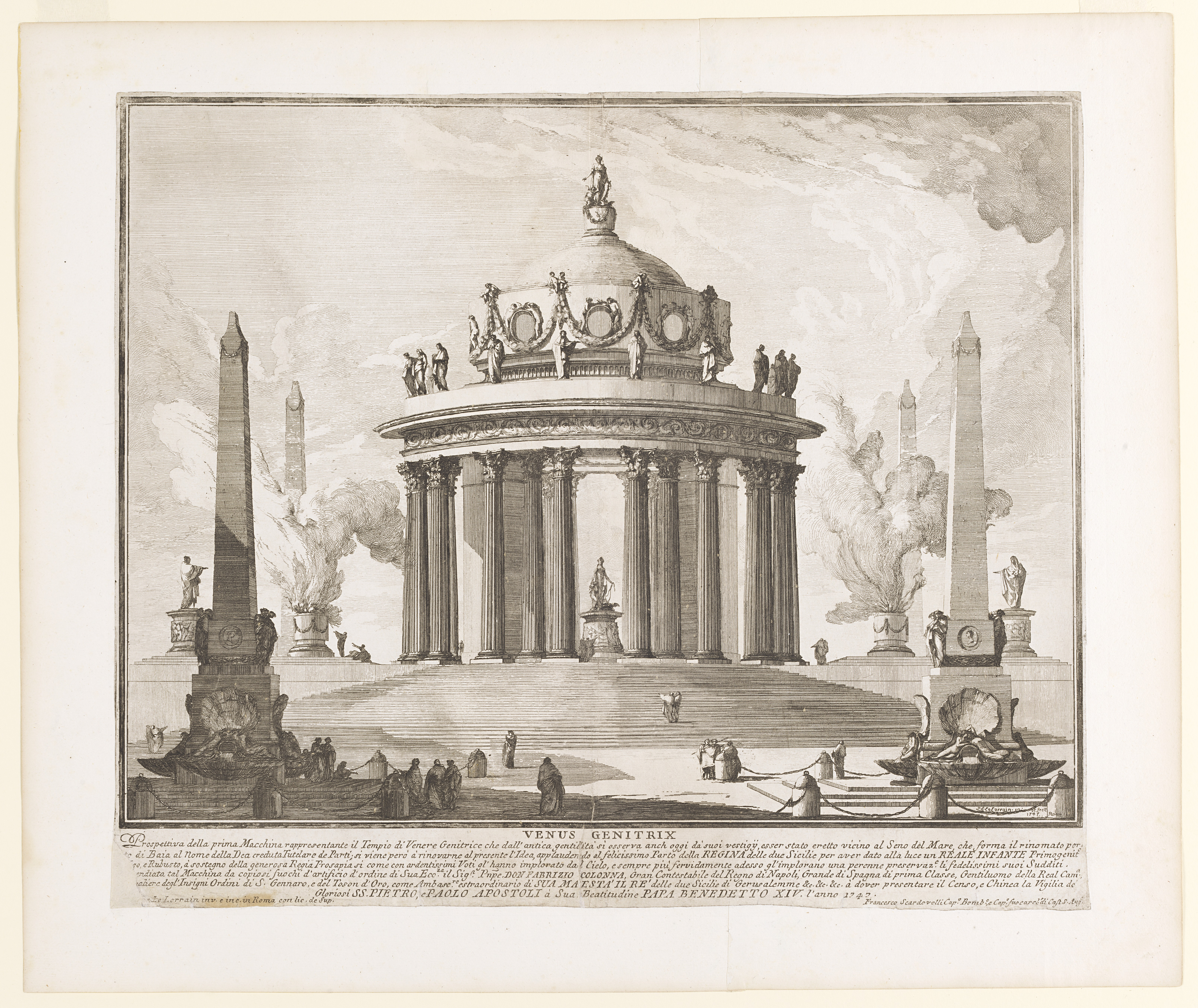
Conjectural illustration (Louis-Joseph Le Lorrain, 1747)

The temple originally sat up against the saddle that joined the Capitoline Hill to the Quirinal Hill.

The temple was built of brick faced with marble and had eight columns (octastyle) on the facade, and also eight columns on each side. The columns were spaced one and a half diameters apart (pycnostyle). The ceiling of the temple was vaulted. There were some nontraditional elements in the design of the temple such as the height of the podium it sat upon and the method of accessing it.

Access to the cella was afforded by circulation through the flanking arches, up narrow stairs on either side, to a landing in front of the temple, from which several more steps extending the width of the facade conducted to the cella level.

It was placed at the far end of the court enclosed by the Forum, a standard practice among the Romans.

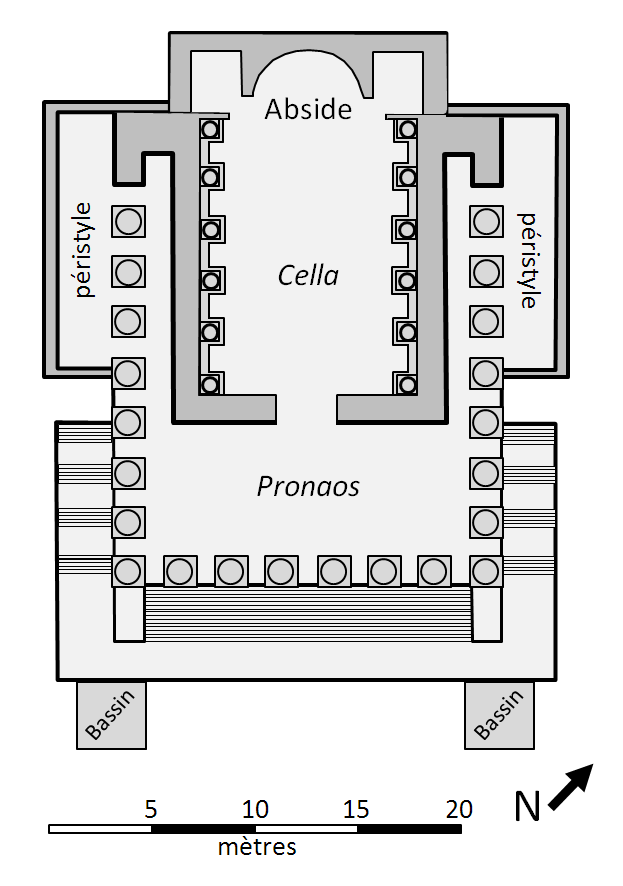
Floorplan (Architectural elements named in French; bassin refers to a pool)

View from the northeast

== Adornment ==
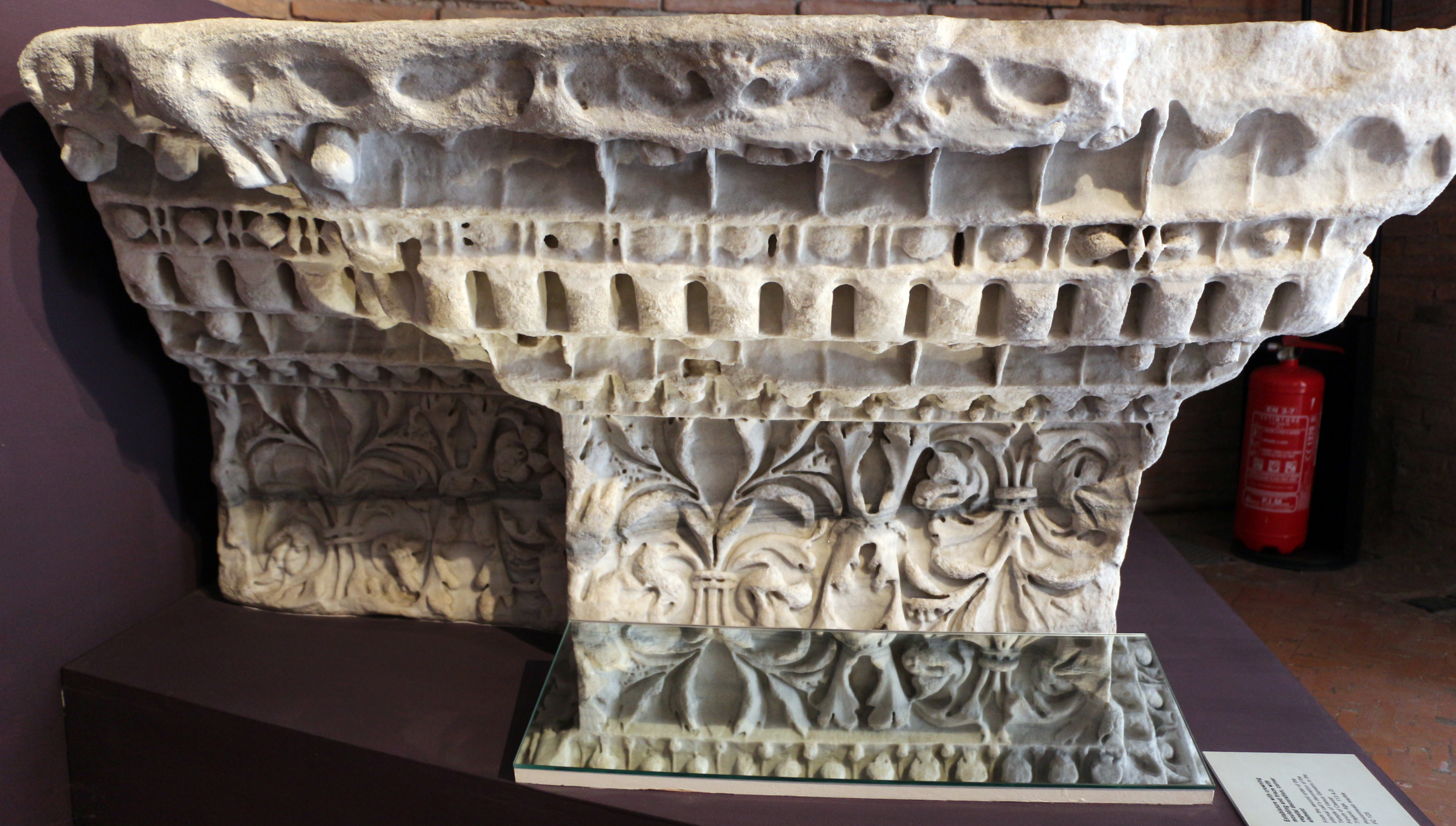
Entablature

Items deposited inside the Temple included a statue of Venus Genetrix by Arcesilaus as well as statues of Julius Caesar. Numerous Greek paintings by Timomachus of Ajax and Medea, six collections of engraved gems, a breastplate decorated with pearls from Britannia, and a controversial golden statue of Queen Cleopatra as the goddess Isis once filled the Temple.

The Temple was styled in Corinthian order. This included carved mouldings, capitals, and entablature. One of the mouldings, the cyma moulding, has carved dolphins, shells, and tridents. These refer to Venus and the sea.

There were three fountain basins: one at the front of the façade and one on either corner of the Temple.

== See also ==
- List of Ancient Roman temples
- List of ancient monuments in Rome
