= Grave Stele of Pollis =

Greco-Persian Gravestone from Megara at the Getty Villa

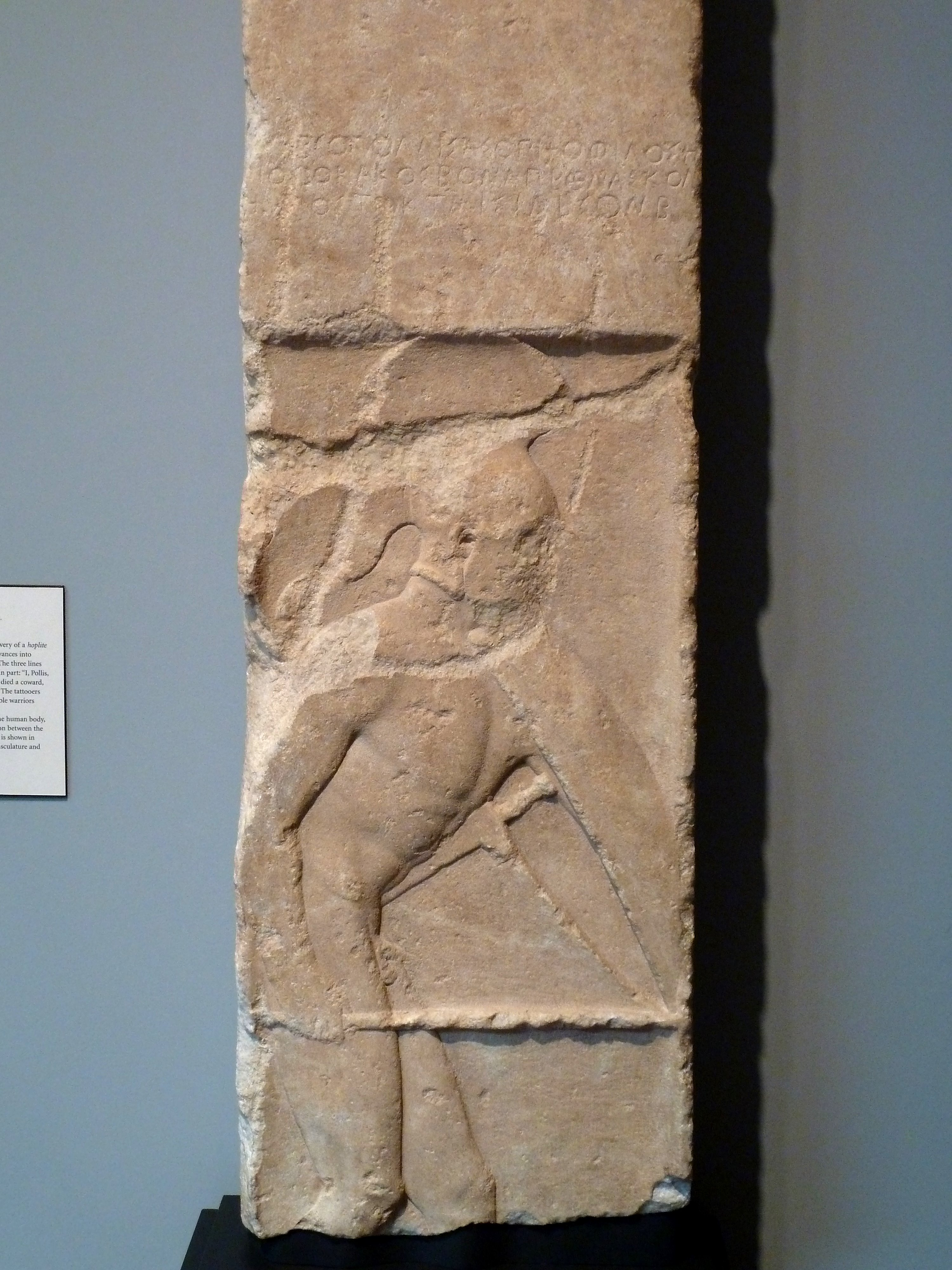
- Material: Parian marble
- Length: 15.9
- Height: 153 cm
- Width: 45.1
- Created: Megara, Greece
- Period/culture: Classical Athens, 480 BC
- Present location: Getty Villa, Santa Monica, California
- Identification: 90.AA.129
- Language: Greek
- Culture: Classical Athens

The Grave Stele of Pollis is a gravestone of the warrior Pollis, who fought and was killed in action during the Greco-Persian Wars. Since 1990, it has been a part of the permanent collection of the Getty Villa, and dating to 480 BC, presents the transition between Archaic Greek Sculpture to Classical Greek sculpture.

== Provenance ==
The original provenance of the stele is uncertain, but was first documented in 1988 in Munich, when a plaster cast was made for the Museum für Abgüsse Klassischer Bildwerke. It was then sold from a private dealer to the New York based Atlantis Antiquities Ltd. before being acquired by the Getty Villa in 1990, which is now a permanent fixture in Gallery 104, dedicated to Archaic and Classical Greek art.

It has seen occasional exhibition at the Getty Center, once in 1999-2004 dedicated to Ancient Art, and again in 2022, which centered on the artist Cy Twombly.

== Description ==
Pollis' face has been eroded with time, but it is likely that the tombstone was carved in the city of Megara approximately 480 BC, and based on status, is likely the son of a Megarian consul member in Boeotia.

The text is relayed above the portrait of Pollis:

ΛΕΓΟ ΠΟΛΛΙΣ ΑΣΟΠΙΧΟ ΦΙΛΟΣ Η[Υ]ΙΟΣ: Ο ΚΑΚΟΣ ΕΟΝ ΑΠΕΘΝΑΣΚΟΝ ΗΥΠΟ ΣΤ[Ι]ΚΤΑΙΣΙΝ ΕΓΟΝΕ “I, Pollis, dear son of Asopichos, speak: Not being a coward, I, for my part, perished at the hands of the tattooers.”

Pollis is depicted nude, spear on the right hand, round shield on the left arm, sword also on the left, and a crested helmet, poised and advancing forth, in low relief.

The "tattooers" refers to Thracians, or Skudra, who were under the employ of Xerxes I in 480 BC. It is indicated that Pollis was among those who participated and was killed during the Battle of Thermopylae.

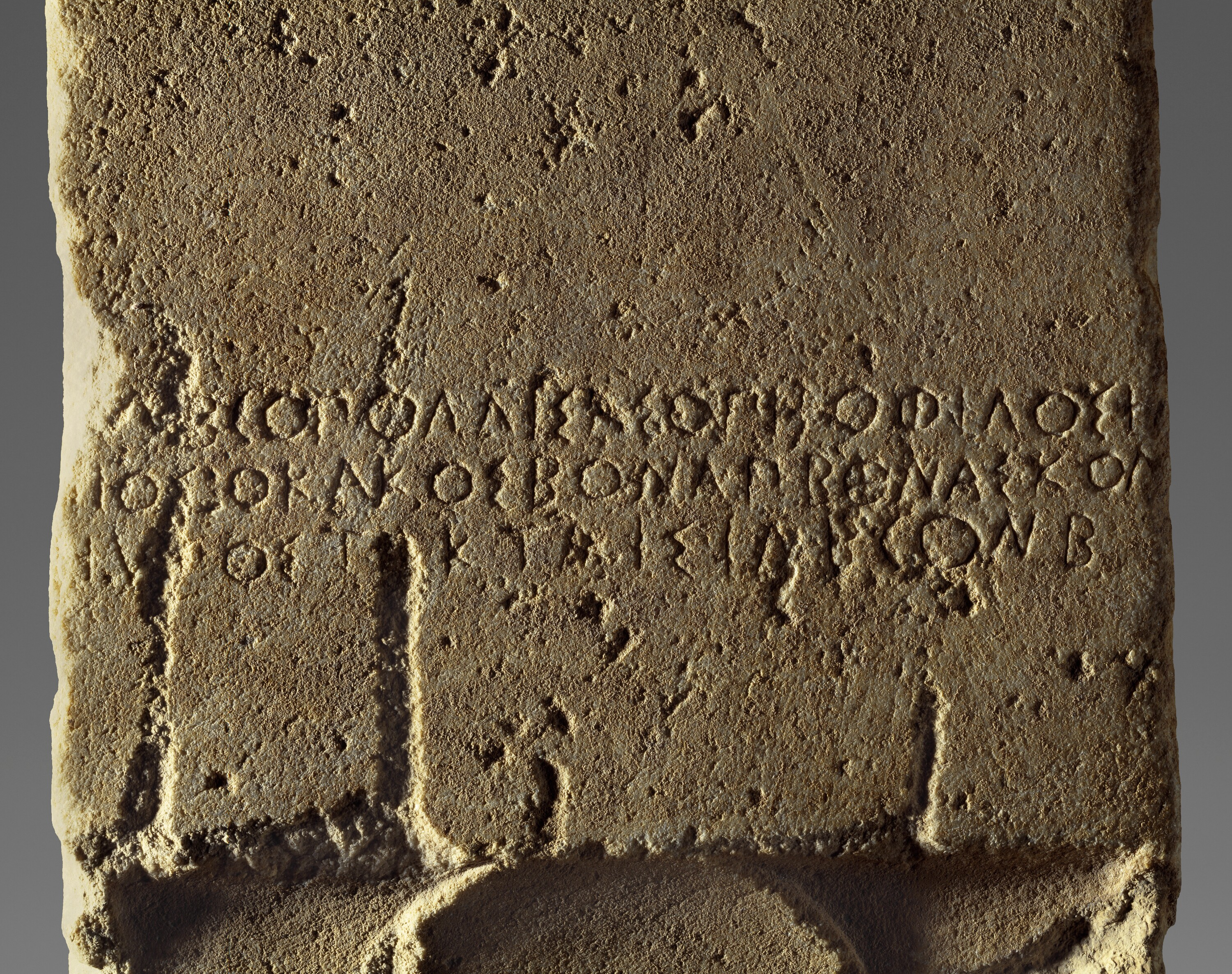
The inscription of the Stele, done in Megarian font, a fusion of Attic and Corinthian writing styles.

The stele was broken in half and subsequently repaired in antiquity, likely a result of inter-conflict amongst Boeotian citizens who were sympathetic to the Persian cause. Also noted is that the legs of Pollis is missing below the knees.

Ultraviolet scans of the stele indicates traces of polychromy, including trace element designs of rosettes and floral patterns. Below the spear has traces of what is believed to be a dog, otherwise the surface is weathered and maintains a brown patina.

The stele presents the profile of Archaic to Classical transition, or Severe style, with the narrow size of the work being typical to that of Archaic steles, most famously the Stele of Aristion, dated to 510 BC and found in Marathon, but unlike Aristion, which depicts a warrior at rest, Pollis is seen mobilizing, a trope more typical to that of Classical art.

The font of the inscription is a fusion of Attic Greek script and Corinthian style, known as Megarian script, which was most used in early portion of the 5th century BC. Of three surviving Megarian works made in the Severe style, this stele is considered the best preserved.
