= Timomachus =

Ancient Greek painter

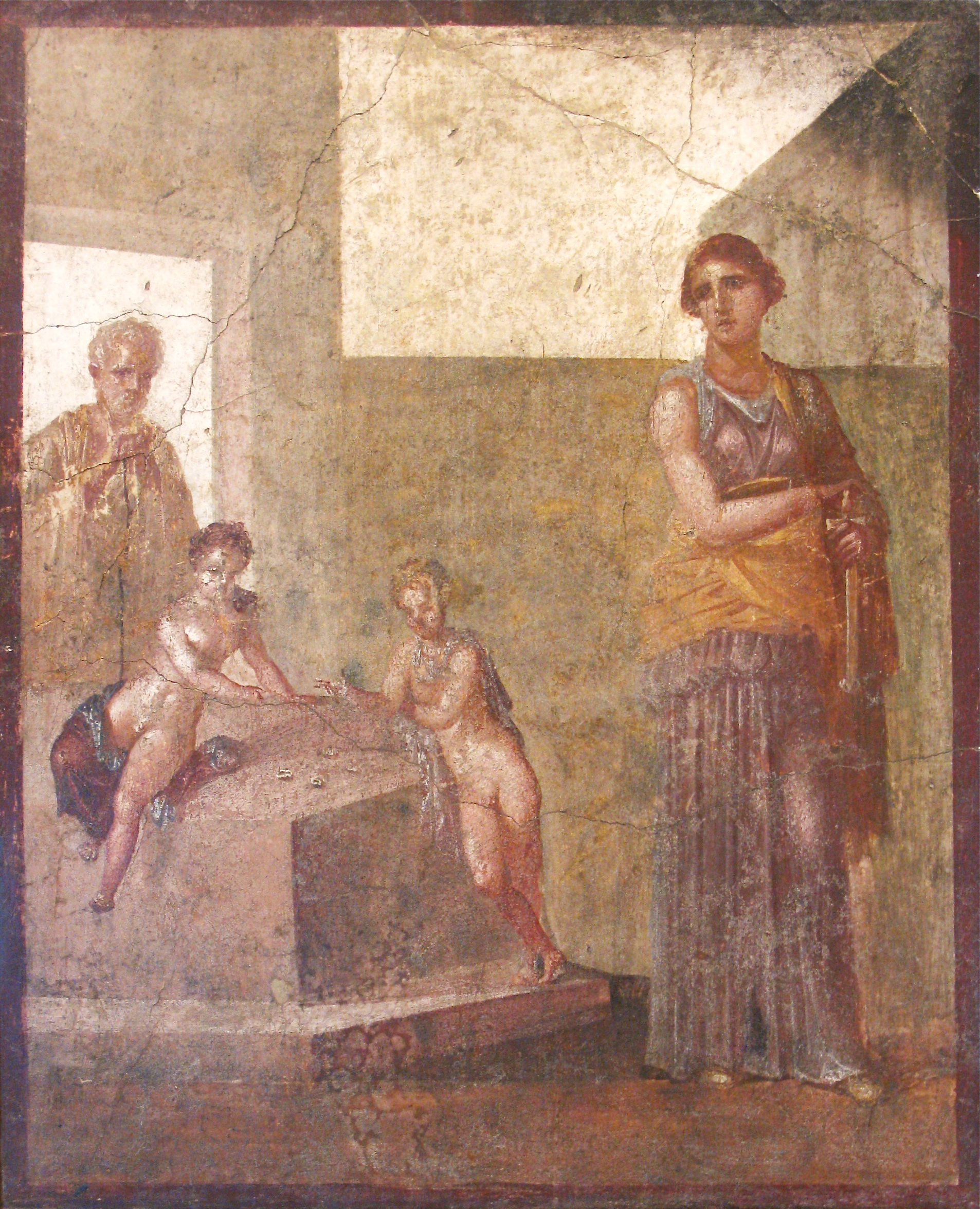
Fresco from the Casa dei Dioscuri, believed to exhibit Timomachus' influence

Timomachus of Byzantium (or Timomachos, Ancient Greek: Τιμόμαχος) was an influential painter of the first century BCE.

== Works ==
Pliny the Elder, in his Naturalis Historia (35.136), records that Julius Caesar had acquired two paintings by Timomachus, one of Ajax during his madness, and a Medea meditating the slaying of her children, which cost him the considerable sum of 80 talents. Scholars have connected these works with the carrying away of a Medea and Ajax from Cyzicus, an ancient port of Anatolia, mentioned in Cicero's In Verrem (2.4.135), and propose that Caesar acquired them there, shortly after his victory at Pharsalus. The paintings, "a pair linked to each other by their rage", were installed in front of the Temple of Venus Genetrix, and remained there until their destruction by fire in 80 CE.

The Anthology of Planudes preserves a number of epigrams on the Medea, which note its incomplete state, and praise its emotional intensity and verisimilitude. Scholars believe that two well-known depictions of Medea preserved at Pompeii were composed under the influence of Timomachus' work.
