= Stele of Aristion =

Archaic Greek stele found in Attica, Greece

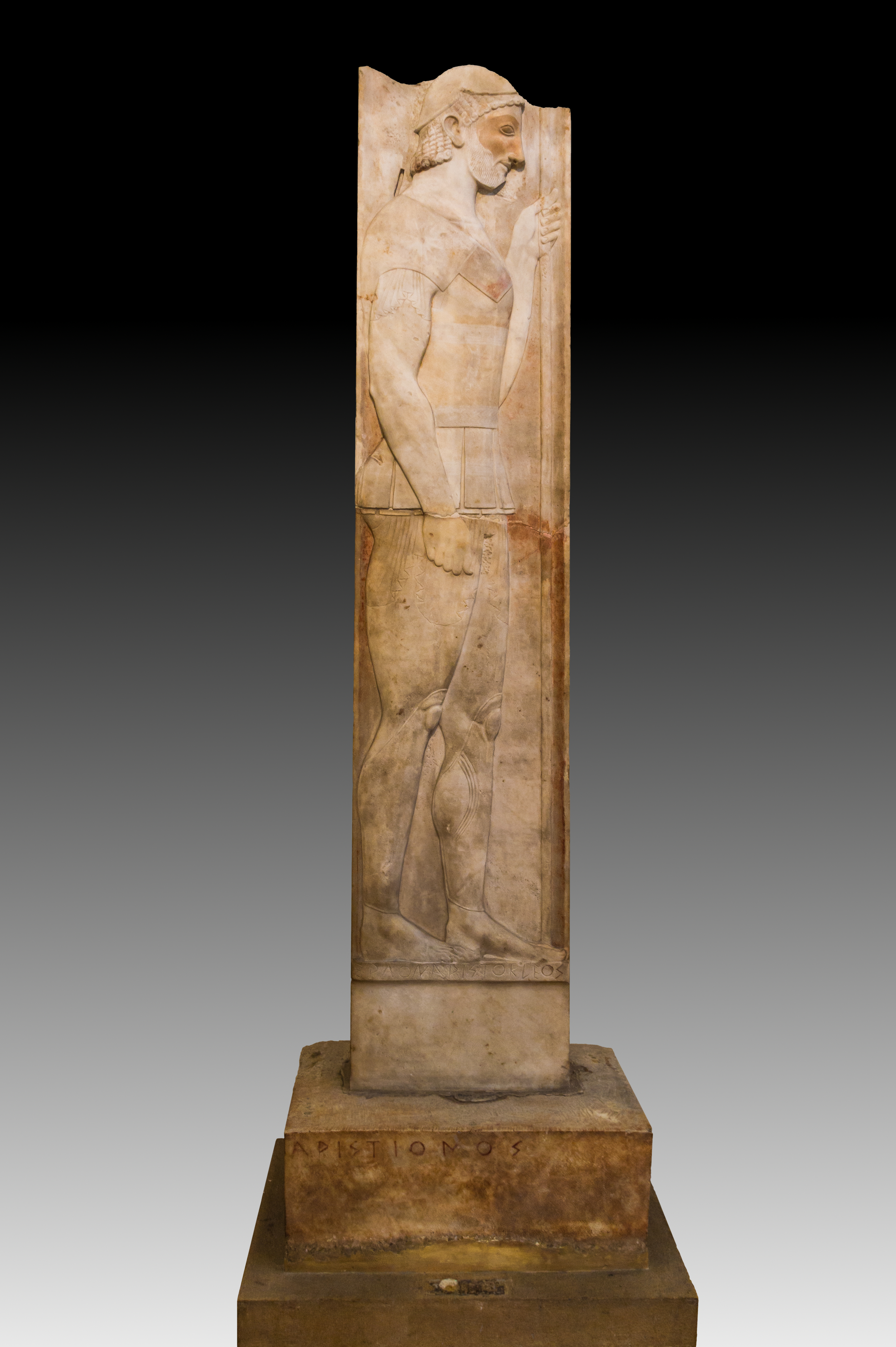
Stele on display, NAMA

The Stele of Aristion dates from around 510 BC. It was created by sculptor Aristokles out of Pentelic marble and shows traces of polychrome. It was found at Velanideza near Marathon in Attica.

== Description ==
The Stele of Aristion or the Marathon Stele is a funerary stele in the National Archaeological Museum, Athens (NAMA, inventory number 29) which dates from around 510 BC. The work is among the best sculptures from late Archaic Greece. It is made of Pentelic marble and measures 2.02 m high. The stele was found with its base, which is 0.24 m high. The uppermost portion of the head and helmet is missing. At the top of the base is an inscription, giving the name of the deceased in the genitive: Ἀριστίονος "Aristion's".

Aristion is depicted as a bearded hoplite soldier in profile, facing right. He wears a short, thin chiton under a corselet. This was originally decorated with painted designs: meanders, zig-zags, and a star on his shoulder. The rest of the statue was also extensively decorated with paint—traces of red, yellow, and blue paint still survive. Aristion also wears an Attic helmet and greaves. His right arm hangs at his side, his left hand holds a spear. Some details are especially well-worked, like the wavy beard, the hair, and the musculature of the arms, legs and chest. In the empty space under his feet there is a horizontal inscribed band, which names the sculptor of the stele: ἔργον Ἀριστοκλέος "Work of Aristokles".

== Creation ==
The sculptor Aristokles was known to have his signature on several bases, but his only famous work is Stele of Aristion. His name then appears on an Attica inscription found at Hieraka, Cape, Greece.

Although the Stele is currently white, this would not have been the case of the Archaic period of Attica. It was not an uncommon practice to add polychrome as a decorative element of marble stele. The Stele of Aristion was originally decorated with painted designs: meanders, zig-zags, along with a star on his shoulder. There are also remnants of red pigment located on the ground of the relief, on the end of the shoulder strap, and on the drapery. The amour of the soldier would have been a blue tint, and the hair would be that of a dark colour.

== See also ==
- Grave Stele of Pollis - Archaic to Classical (Severe style) stele of a similar profile, now housed at the Getty Villa

== Bibliography ==
- Nikolaos Kaltsas: Sculpture in the National Archaeological Museum, Athens. The J. Paul Getty Museum, Los Angeles 2002, ISBN 0892366869, p. 70.
