= Callimachus (sculptor) =

Ancient Greek architect and sculptor

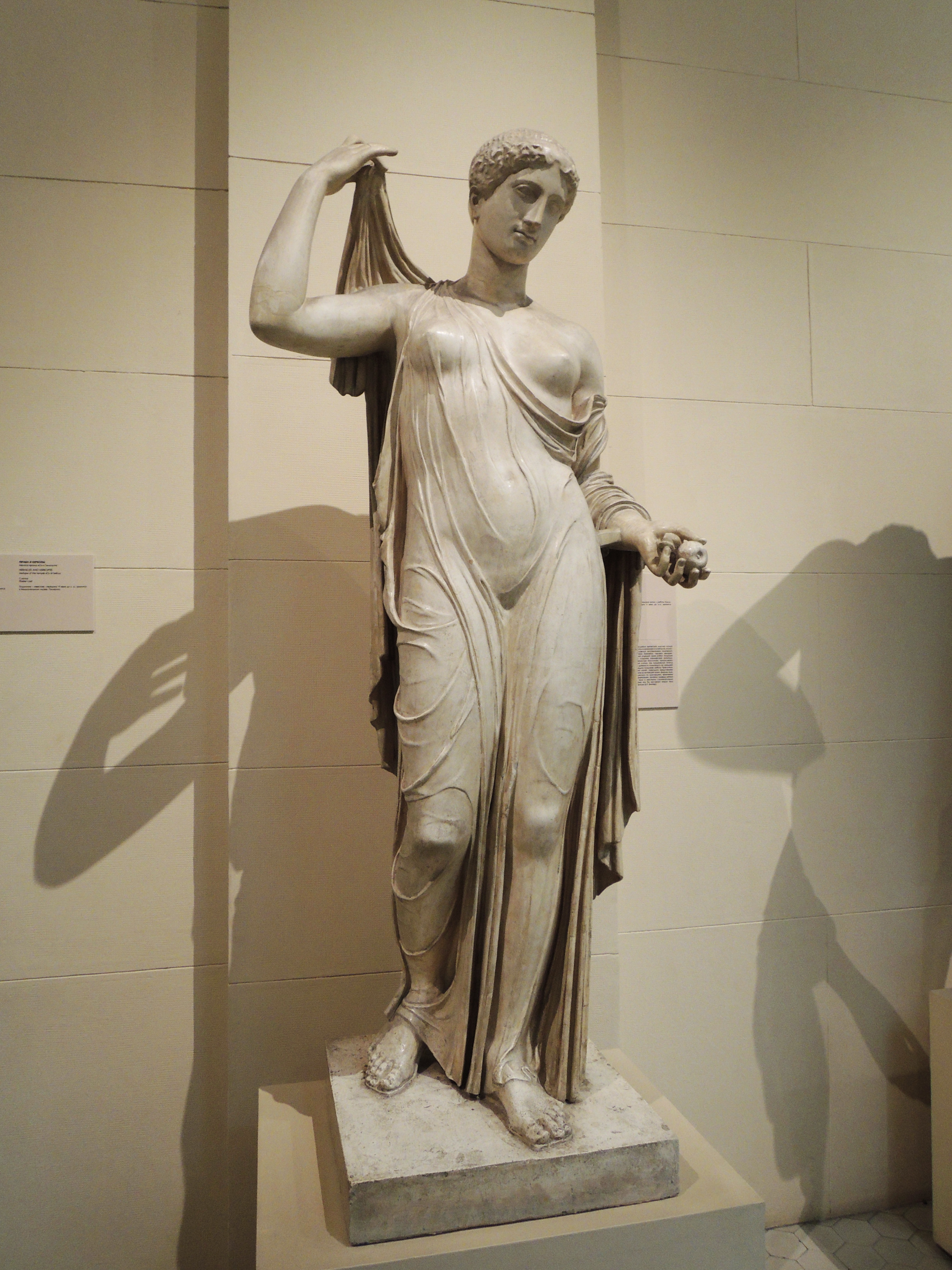
The Venus Genetrix, sometimes attributed to him.

Callimachus (Ancient Greek: Καλλίμαχος Kallímakhos) was an architect and sculptor working in the second half of the 5th century BC in the manner established by Polyclitus. He was credited with work in both Athens and Corinth and was probably from one of the two cities. According to Vitruvius (iv.1), for his great ingenuity and taste the Athenians dubbed Callimachus katatêxitechnos (literally, 'finding fault with one's own craftsmanship': perfectionist). His reputation in the 2nd century AD was reported in an aside by Pausanias as one "although not of the first rank of artists, was yet of unparalleled cleverness, so that he was the first to drill holes through stones"—that is, in order to enhance surface effects of light and shade in locks of hair, foliage and other details. Thus it is reported that Callimachus was known for his penchant for elaborately detailed sculptures or drapery, though few securely attributed works by him survive.

== Career and achievements ==
=== Corinthian Order ===
Callimachus is credited with inventing the Corinthian order, which Roman architects erected into one of the Classical orders. The Corinthian order is one of the three classical orders of ancient Greek and Roman architecture, alongside the Doric and Ionic orders. It is characterized by its ornate and decorative capital, featuring acanthus leaves and other botanical motifs. The Corinthian Order was often underutilized due to the popularity of the Doric and Ionic orders at the time. One of the earliest examples of the Corinthian order can be found in the Temple of Apollo at Bassae, built in the mid-5th century BCE. The temple's frieze, which features a procession of figures, is considered one of the finest examples of ancient Greek sculpture. The temple's use of the Corinthian order demonstrates the increasing importance of decoration and ornamentation in ancient Greek architecture.

The Corinthian order continued to be used in ancient Roman architecture, where it was often employed in public buildings such as temples, basilicas, and forums. One notable example is the Temple of Mars Ultor in Rome, built by the emperor Augustus in the 1st century BCE. The temple's intricate Corinthian capitals are considered some of the finest examples of Roman architecture.

==== Birth of the Corinthian style ====
It is related that the original discovery of this form of capital was as follows. A freeborn maiden of Corinth, just of marriageable age, was attacked by an illness and died. After her burial, her nurse, collecting a few little things which used to give the girl pleasure while she was alive, put them in a basket, carried it to the tomb, and laid it on top thereof, covering it with a roof-tile so that the things might last longer in the open air. This basket happened to be placed just above the root of an acanthus. The acanthus root, pressed down meanwhile though it was by the weight, when springtime came round put forth leaves and stalks in the middle, and the stalks, growing up along the sides of the basket, and pressed out by the corners of the tile through the compulsion of its weight, were forced to bend into volutes at the outer edges. Just then Callimachus, whom the Athenians called katatêxitechnos for the refinement and delicacy of his artistic work, passed by this tomb and observed the basket with the tender young leaves growing round it. Delighted with the novel style and form, he built some columns after that pattern for the Corinthians, determined their symmetrical proportions, and established from that time forth the rules to be followed in finished works of the Corinthian order.

=== Chryselephantine sculptures ===
Callimachus was known for his exceptional work in creating chryselephantine sculptures. According to the ancient Greek writer Pliny the Elder, Callimachus was the first to develop the technique of using ivory and gold in his sculptures. He created his chryselephantine sculptures by using a core of wood or other materials, which was then covered with thin sheets of ivory and gold leaf. This technique allowed him to create intricate and detailed sculptures with a lifelike appearance. Further evidence supporting Callimachus's use of the chryselephantine technique can be found in the surviving fragments of his work. The statue of Athena Parthenos was one of his most famous projects that was sculpted using this technique.

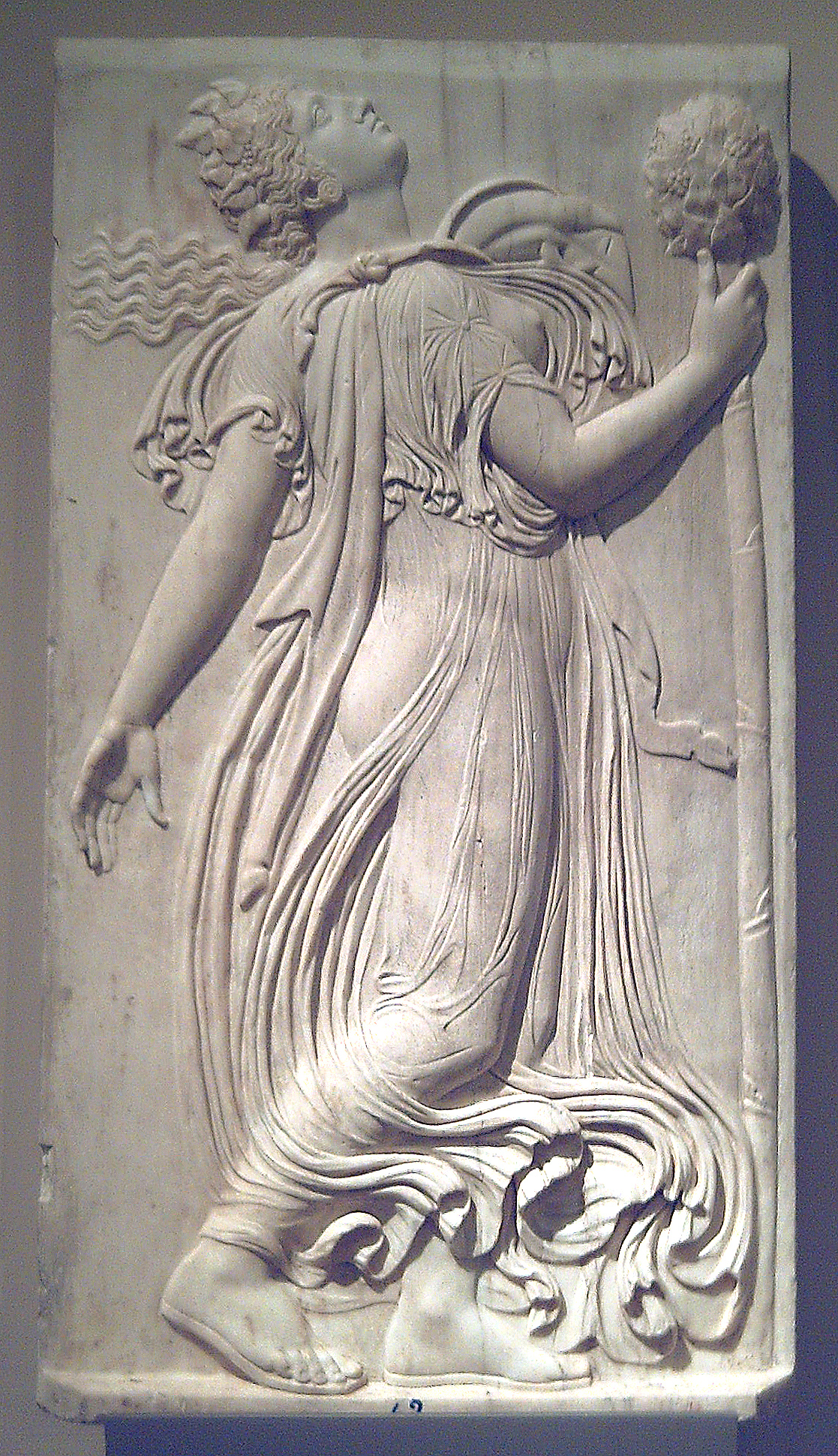
Maenad

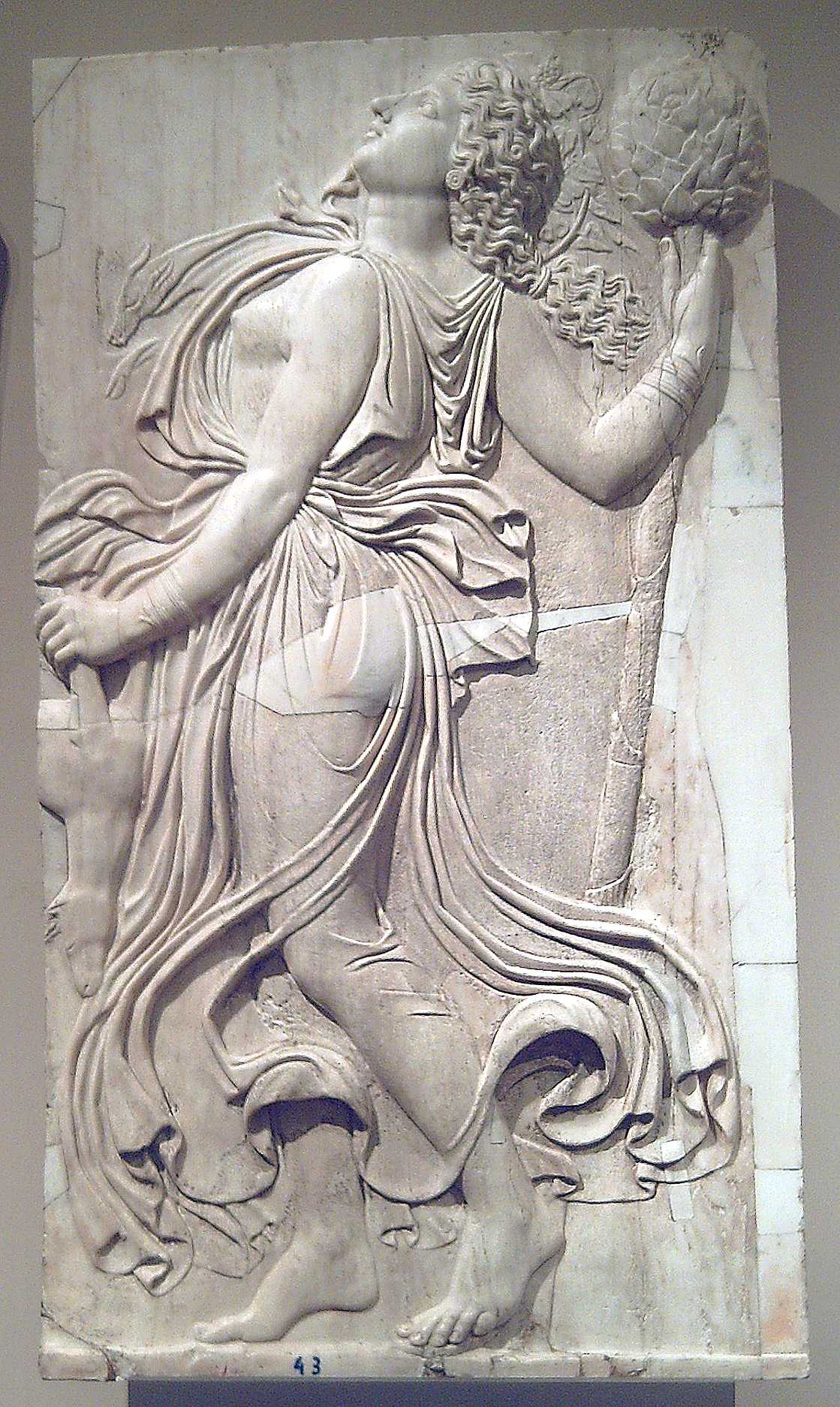
Maenad

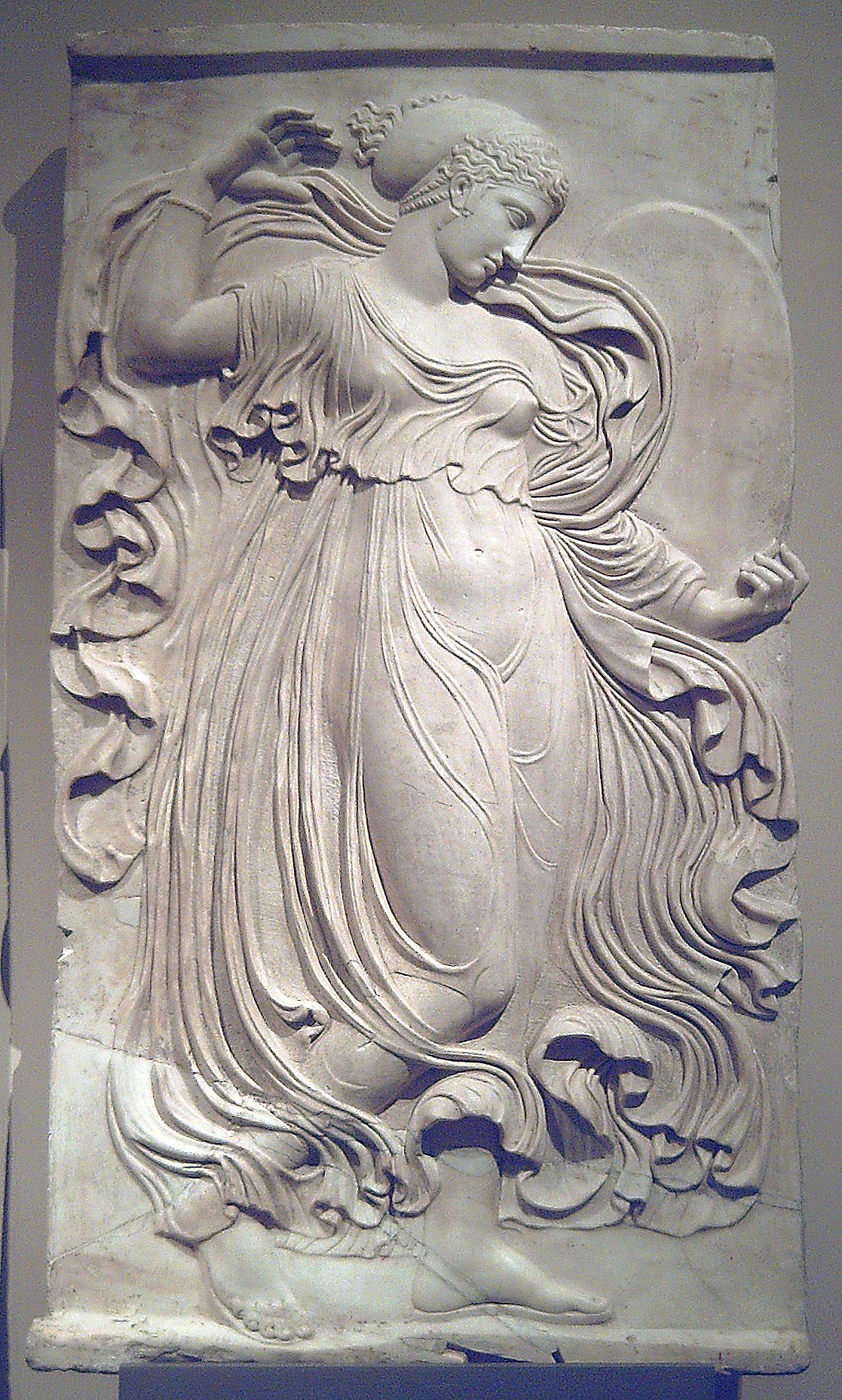
Maenad

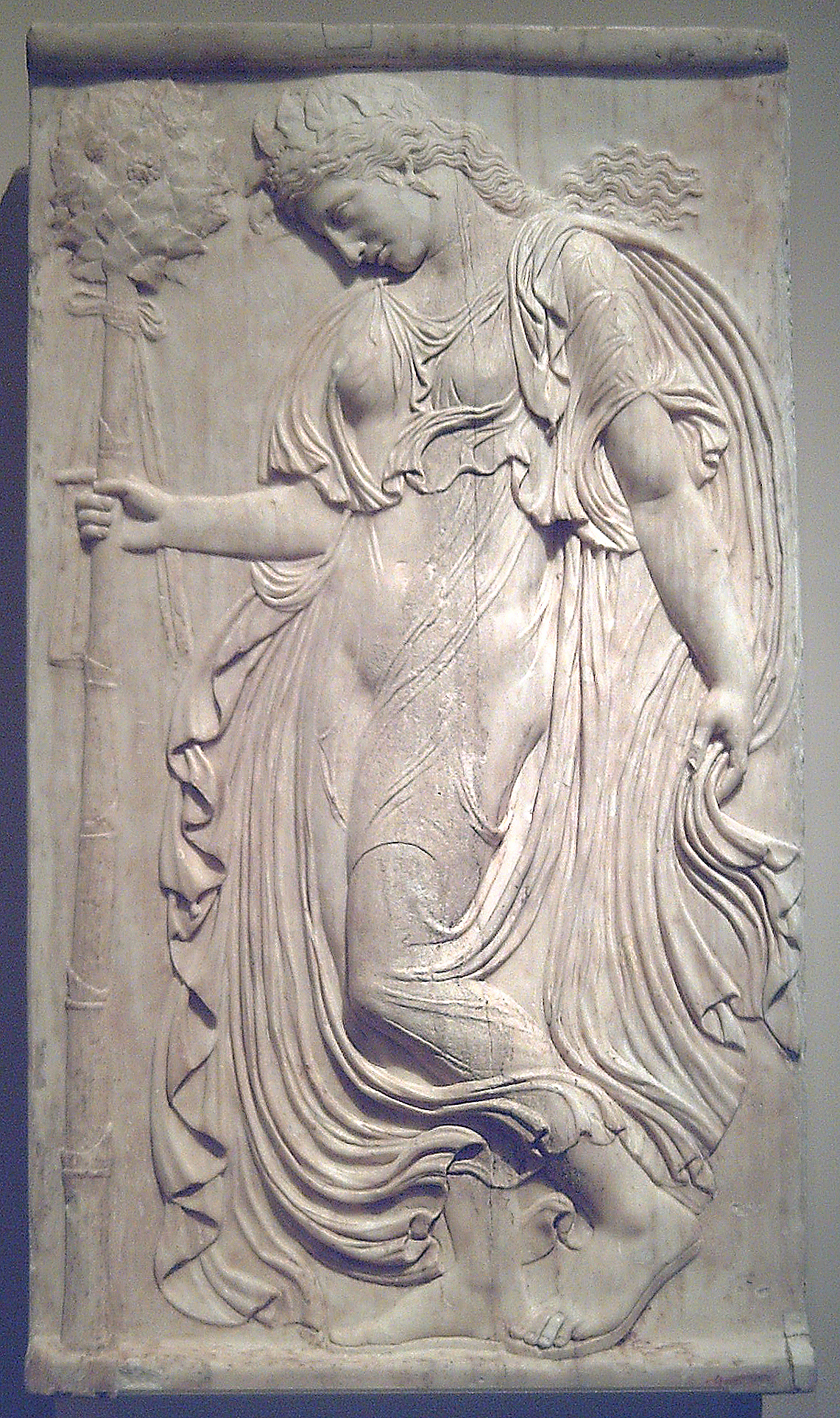
Maenad

==== Temple of Athena ====
Callimachus is credited with the sculptures of Nikes on the frieze of the Temple of Athena Nike ("Athena, Bringer of Victory"), by the Propylaea of the Acropolis of Athens. The small temple was commissioned by Pericles shortly before his death in 429, and built ca 427– 410. Pliny mentions his Laconian Dancers. Six ecstatic Maenads attributed to him exist in Roman copies. Callimachus was also part of a team of expert craftsmen including Phidias, who together are credited for the construction of the Athena Parthenos statue in Athens. The statue was about 11.50 meters tall and made of ivory and gold, with details such as the goddess's sandals and cloak rendered in solid gold. Unfortunately, the statue was lost to history and only survives in descriptions and depictions from ancient sources.

The clinging draperies of the above works has led to the original of the Venus Genetrix type (whose draperies are similarly clinging) being also attributed to him.

In the cella of the Erechtheion hung a golden lamp called asbestos lychnis invented by Callimachus. According to Pausanias' Description of Greece, the lamp only needed to be refilled with oil once a year as the asbestos wick did not burn. Above it hung a bronze palm branch which trapped any rising smoke.

An inscription from Aigai of the late 5th century BC may be attributed to some work of Callimachus and the time when Archelaus invited artists to Macedon.

== Ancient sources ==
- Pausanias, (I.xxvi.6-7); Vitruvius (IV.1.9-10); Pliny the Elder, Natural History XXXIV.xix.32); Chryselephantine sculpture, (VI.xixx.3-4); Athena Parthenos, (IX.xviii.6-7)
