= Arcesilaus (sculptor) =

Ancient Greek sculptor

Arcesilaus (Ancient Greek: Ἀρκεσίλαος) was a sculptor in the first century B.C, who, according to Pliny, was held in high esteem at Rome, was especially celebrated by Marcus Terentius Varro, and was intimate with Lucius Cornelius Lentulus Crus.

Among his works were a statue of Venus Genetrix in the forum of Caesar, and a marble lioness surrounded by winged Cupids, who were sporting with her. Of the latter work the mosaics in the Mus. Borb. 7.61, and the Mus. Capit. 4.19, are supposed to be copies. There were some statues by him of centaurs carrying nymphs, in the collection of Gaius Asinius Pollio.

Arcesilaus received a talent from Octavius, a Roman knight, for the model of a bowl (crater), and was engaged by Lucullus to make a statue of Felicitas for 60 sestertii; but the deaths both of the artist and of his patron prevented the completion of the work.
