= Ex pede Herculem =

Maxim of proportionality

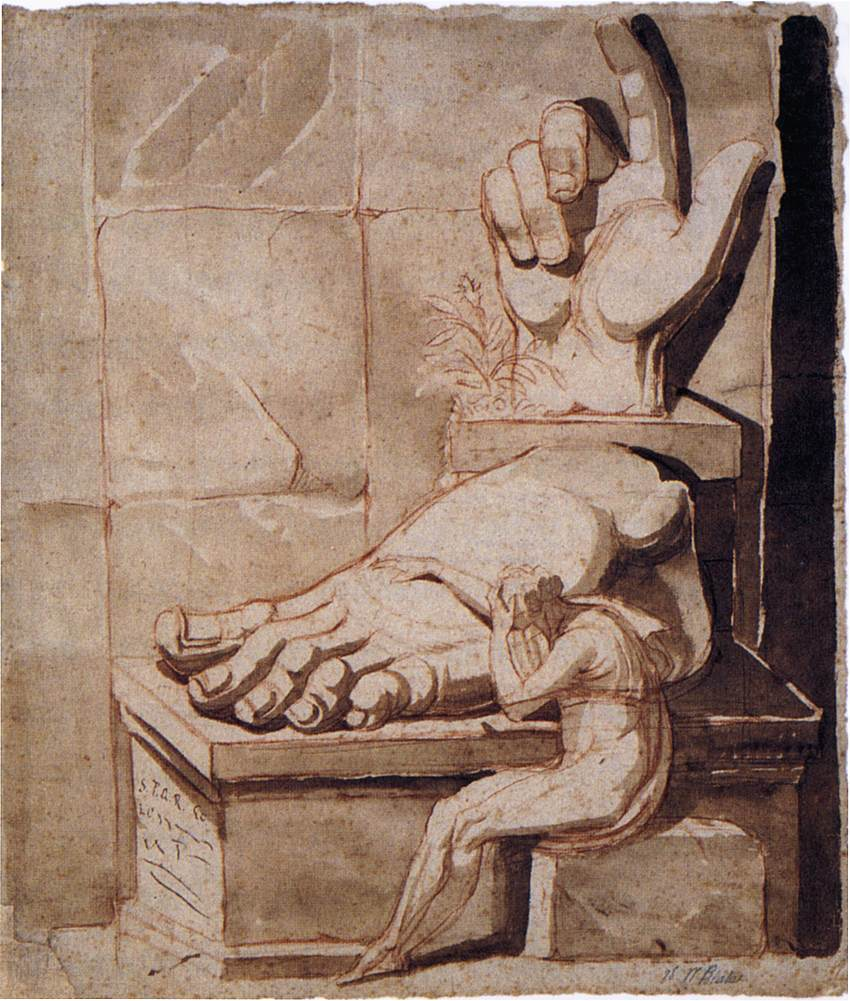
The Artist Moved to Despair by the Grandeur of Antique Fragments, chalk and sepia drawing by Henry Fuseli, 1778-79

Ex pede Herculem, "from his foot, [we can measure] Hercules", is a maxim of proportionality inspired by an experiment attributed to Pythagoras.

== Origin ==
According to Aulus Gellius' Noctes Atticae:

"The philosopher Pythagoras reasoned sagaciously and acutely in determining and measuring the hero's superiority in size and stature. For since it was generally agreed that Hercules paced off the racecourse of the stadium at Pisae, near the temple of Olympian Zeus, and made it six hundred feet long, and since other courses in the land of Greece, constructed later by other men, were indeed six hundred feet in length, but yet were somewhat shorter than that at Olympia, he readily concluded by a process of comparison that the measured length of Hercules' foot was greater than that of other men in the same proportion as the course at Olympia was longer than the other stadia. Then, having ascertained the size of Hercules' foot, he made a calculation of the bodily height suited to that measure, based upon the natural proportion of all parts of the body, and thus arrived at the logical conclusion that Hercules was as much taller than other men as the race course at Olympia exceeded the others that had been constructed with the same number of feet." (translated by John C. Rolfe of the University of Pennsylvania for the Loeb Classical Library, 1927)

In other words, one can extrapolate the whole from the part. Ex ungue leonem, "from its claw [we can know] the lion," is a similar phrase, anecdotally attributed to Johann Bernoulli.

The principle was raised to an axiom of biology by D'Arcy Wentworth Thompson, in On Growth and Form, 1917; it has found dependable use in paleontology, where the measurements of a fossil jawbone or a single vertebra offer a close approximation of the size of a long-extinct animal, in cases where comparable animals are already known. The studies of proportionality in biology are pursued in the fields of morphogenesis, biophysics and biostatistics.

== See also ==
- List of Latin phrases
