= Bronze colossus of Constantine =

326 AD bronze statue, 11 meters tall

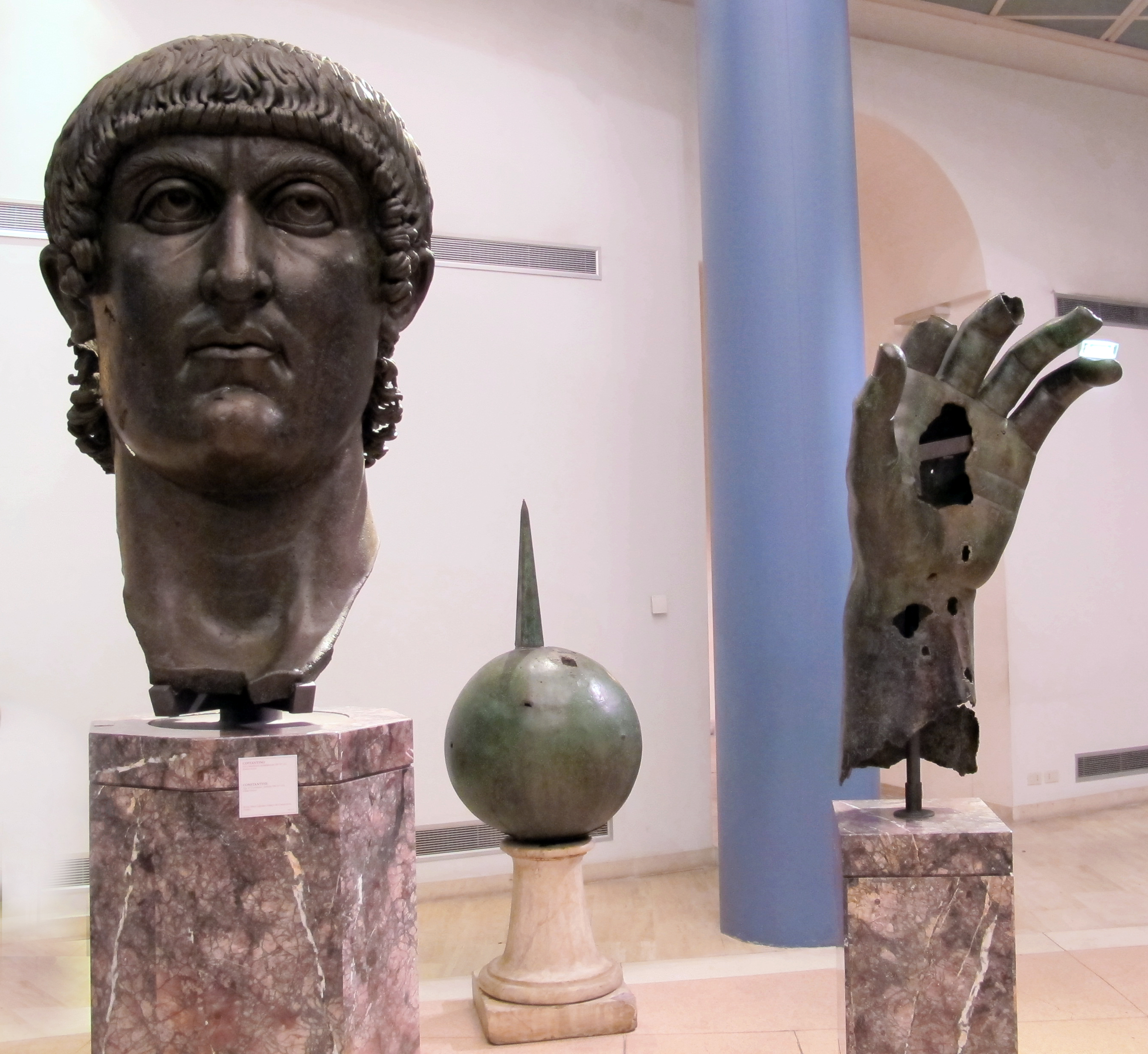
Three fragments of the bronze colossus of Constantine in 2013, including the left hand without the reunited index finger

The Capitoline Museums in Rome hold parts of a bronze colossus of Constantine. The colossal statue of a Roman emperor was likely made in the 4th century, but only fragments survive. It is usually interpreted as depicting Constantine the Great.

The museum also holds fragments from an acrolithic Colossus of Constantine, an even larger marble statue once erected in the Basilica of Maxentius near the Forum Romanum, which are displayed in the courtyard of the museum's Palazzo dei Conservatori on the Capitoline Hill.

== Description ==
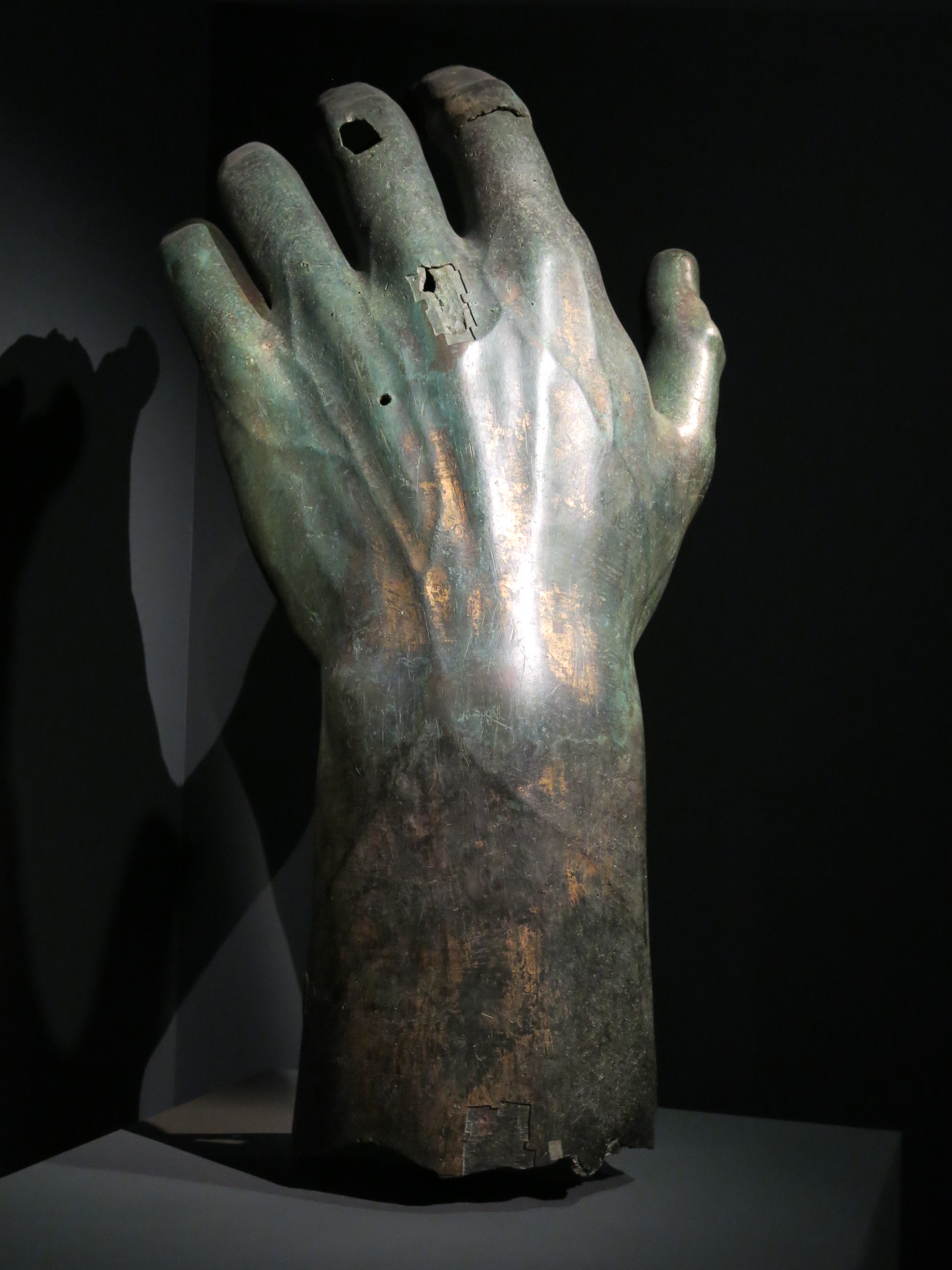
Left hand of the statue and index finger

The bronze statue was likely made before the year 326. When complete, it may have reached 10 to 12 m (33 to 39 ft) in height. Three large fragments of the statue survive, some with traces of gilding: a large head, 177 cm (70 in) high, or 125 cm (49 in) without the neck (recorded in the museum's inventory as MC1072); a left hand, which measures 150 cm (59 in) (inv. MC1070); and a spiked orb measuring 150 cm (59 in) (inv. MC1065). All three fragments are damaged: the crown of the head is missing, as are parts of some fingers of the hand. Early sources indicate the head was crowned, with the left hand holding a globe (both surviving but now separated) and the right hand holding a sword (both missing). Much of the statue is missing: many bronze panels may have been melted down in late antiquity or the Middle Ages.

The missing end of the index finger, about 38 cm (15 in) long, was rediscovered in 2018 in the collection of the Louvre Museum in Paris (inv. Br 78). It had been acquired with the collection of Giampietro Campana in 1862, but was long mistaken for a toe. It was reunited with the hand in 2021 in an initial five year renewable loan. The end of the middle finger remains missing.

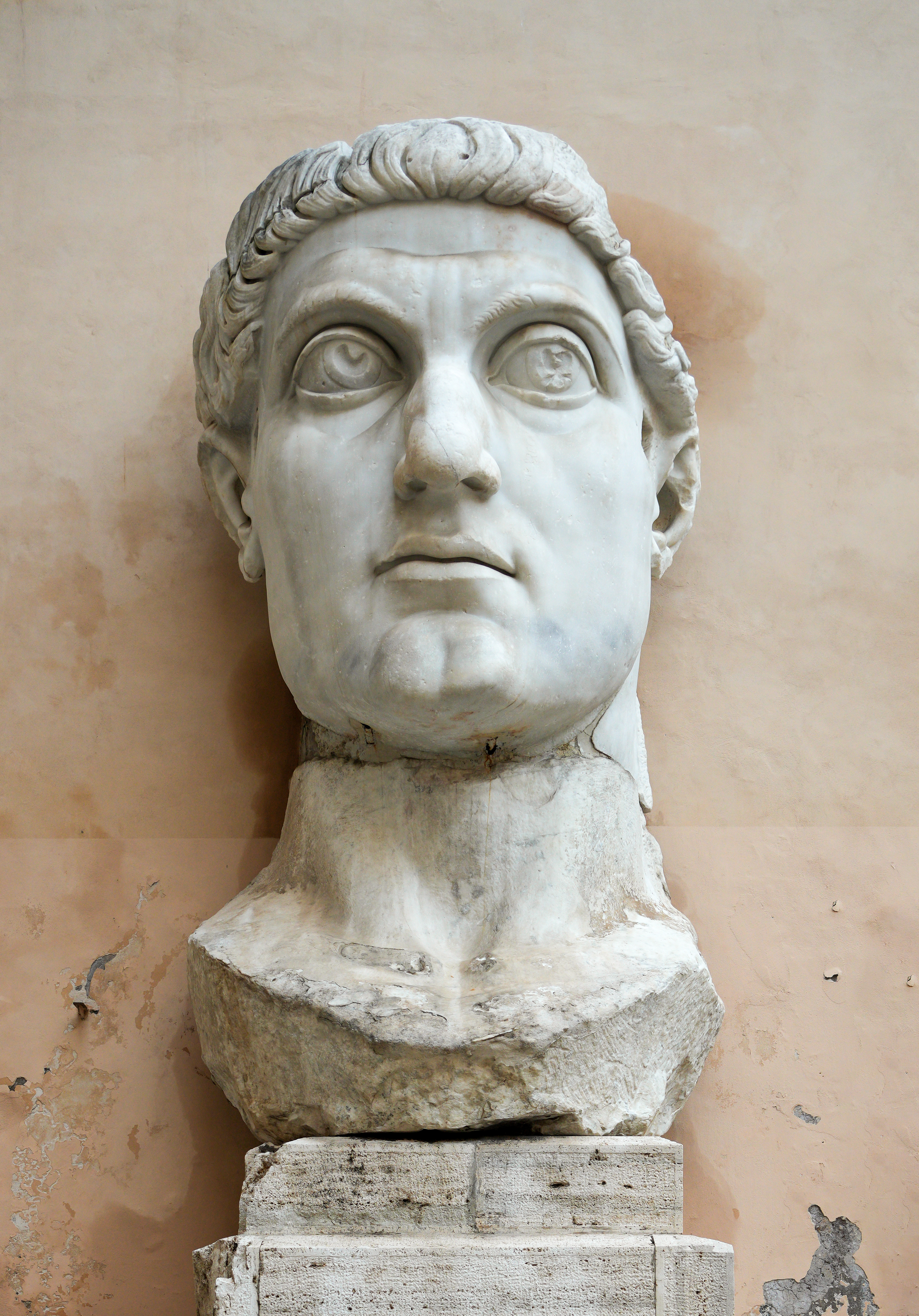
Head of the marble Colossus of Constantine

Based on its similarity to the emperor's depictions on coins and resemblance to the marble Colossus of Constantine, the head is usually identified as a portrait of Constantine the Great, who was Roman emperor from 306 to 337. It is thought to have been made before his vicennalia, celebrating the twentieth year of his reign in 326. From other numismatic evidence, others have suggested it may depict Constantine's son, Constantius II. Some have suggested the statue reuses parts of a much earlier Colossus of Nero, although probably not the colossus erected at the Flavian amphitheatre, perhaps later remodelled to represent Commodus, and later remodelled again to represent Constantine.

== Location ==
The statue may have been originally erected at the Lateran Palace, then known as the "Domus Faustae" or "House of Fausta" after Constantine's second wife Fausta. By the 1320s, a head and hand were displayed between the church of St John Lateran and the Lateran Palace, near the equestrian statue of Marcus Aurelius, which was then also thought to depict Constantine.

Along with other antiquities, including the Capitoline Wolf and the Spinario, the fragments were donated to the city of Rome by Pope Sixtus IV in 1471, and transferred to the Palazzo dei Conservatori on the Capitoline Hill, now part of the Capitoline Museum. The left hand still held the orb as late as the 1580s, but around this time the orb was removed to be mounted on the columna milliaria that had marked the first mile (1000 paces) along the Appian Way, which had also been moved to the Capitoline. An 18th century etching by Piranesi shows the orb mounted on this column.

The orb and the other fragments are now held in the Capitoline Museum, and displayed in the Exhedra of Marcus Aurelius, a glass pavilion constructed in the 1990s to house the original gilt-bronze equestrian statue of Marcus Aurelius after it was restored (with its place in the Piazza del Campidoglio taken by a replica), along with a gilt-bronze statue of Hercules found in the Forum Boarium.

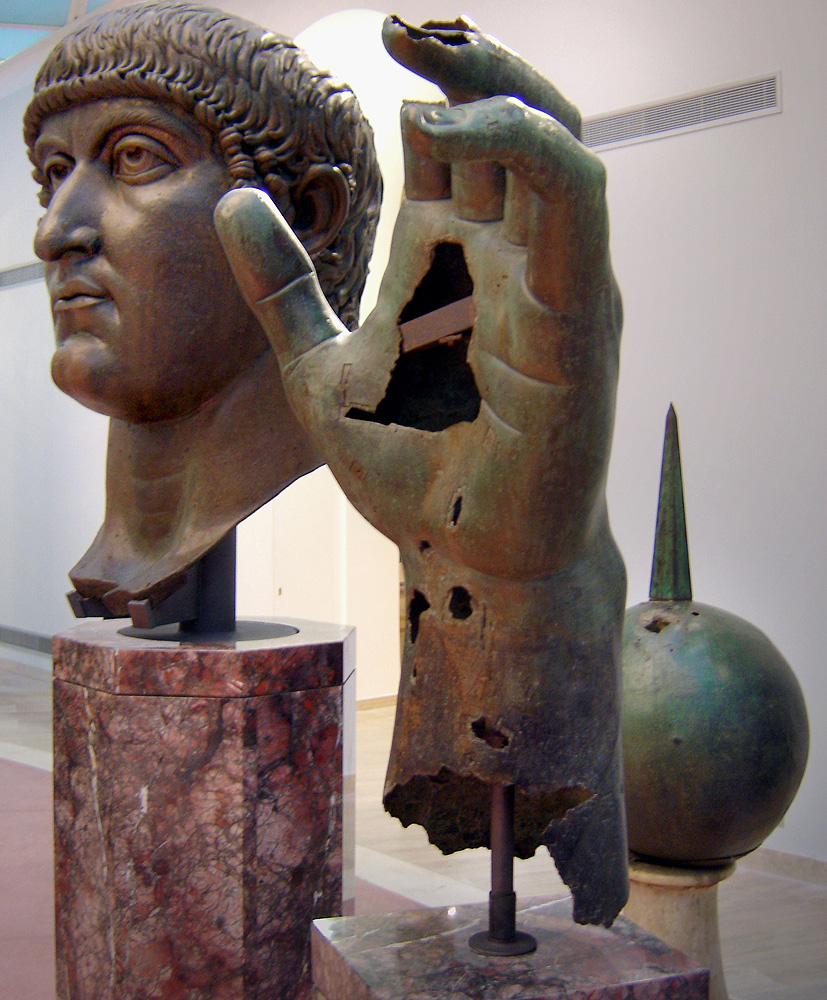
Three surviving parts of the colossus, in 2006: head, left hand, and spiked orb

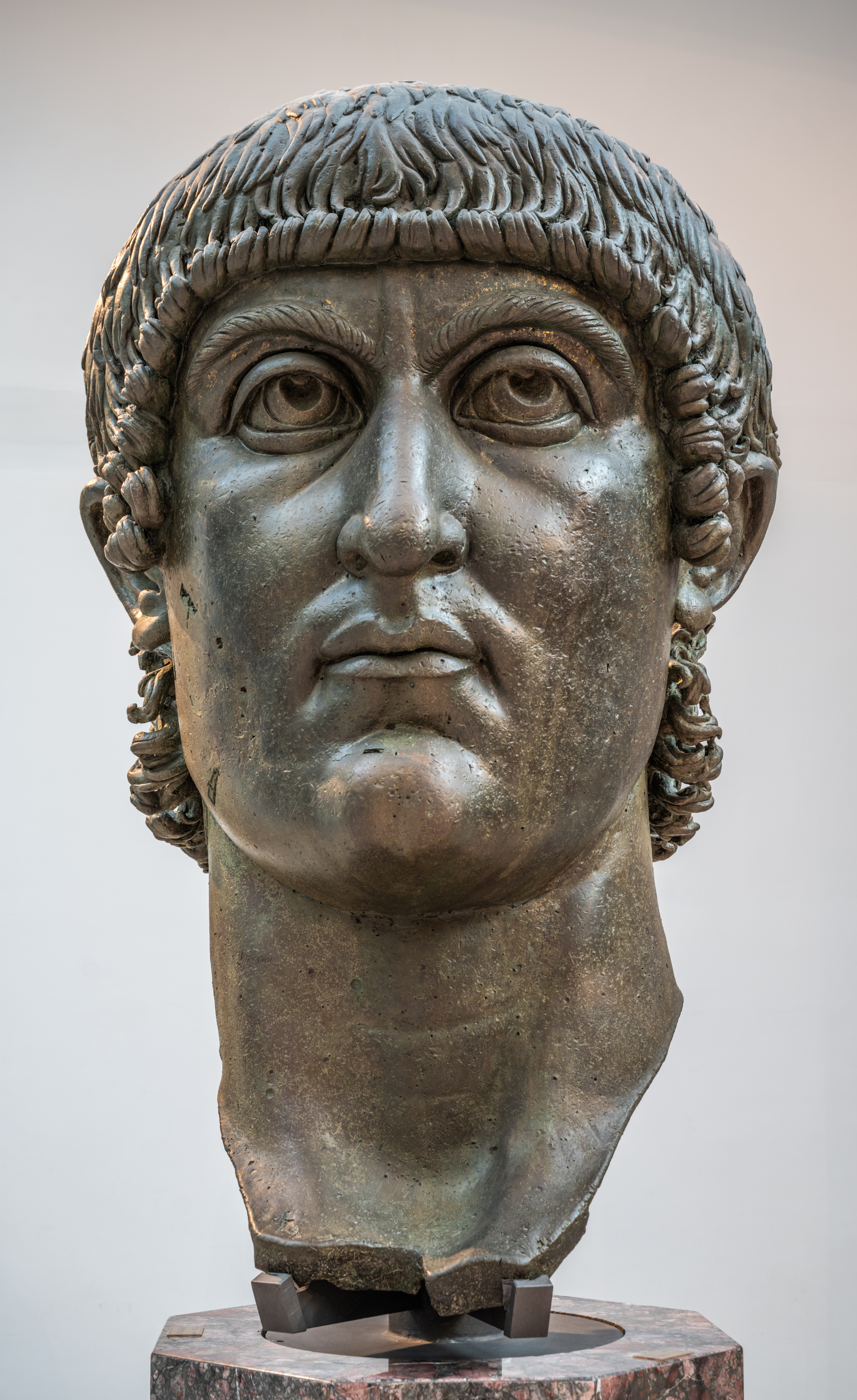
Head, 2024

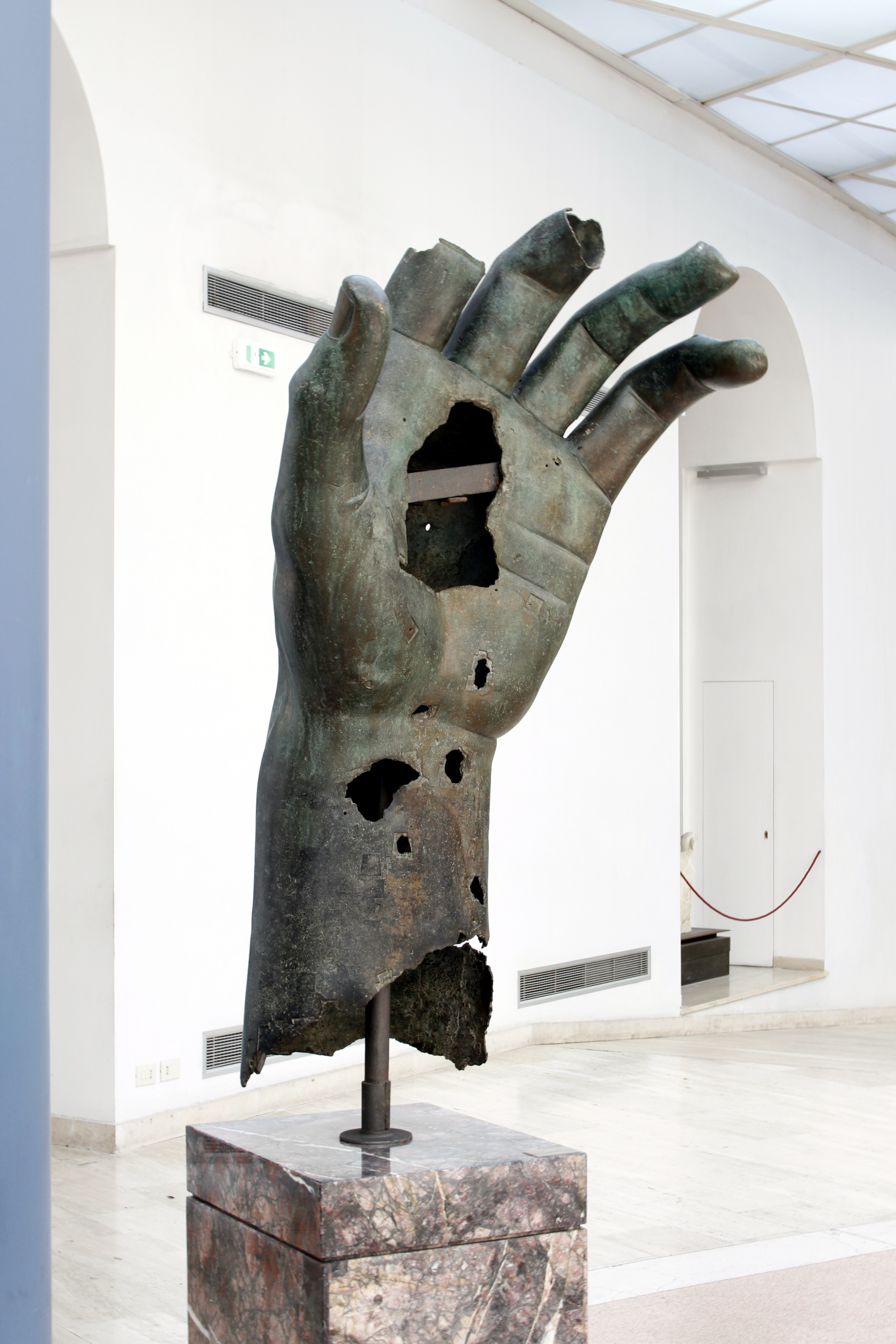
Hand, 2016

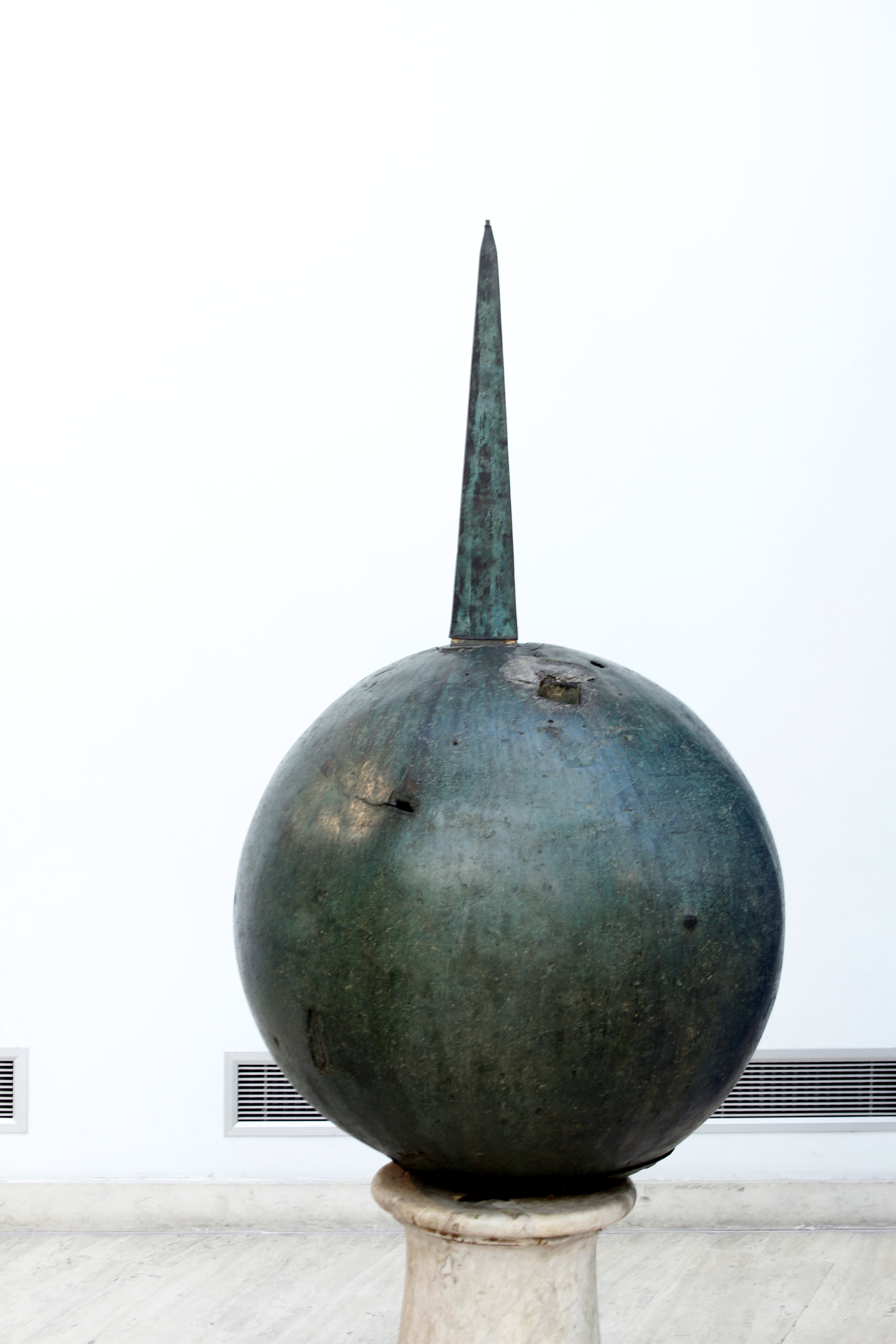
Orb, 2016

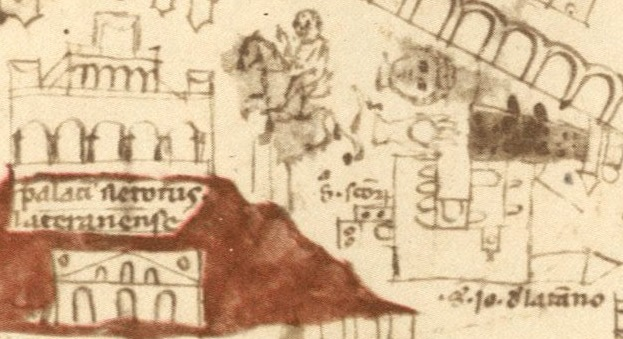
Map by Paulino da Venezia c.1320 showing the head and hand (right of centre) near the equestrian statue of Marcus Aurelius at the Lateran

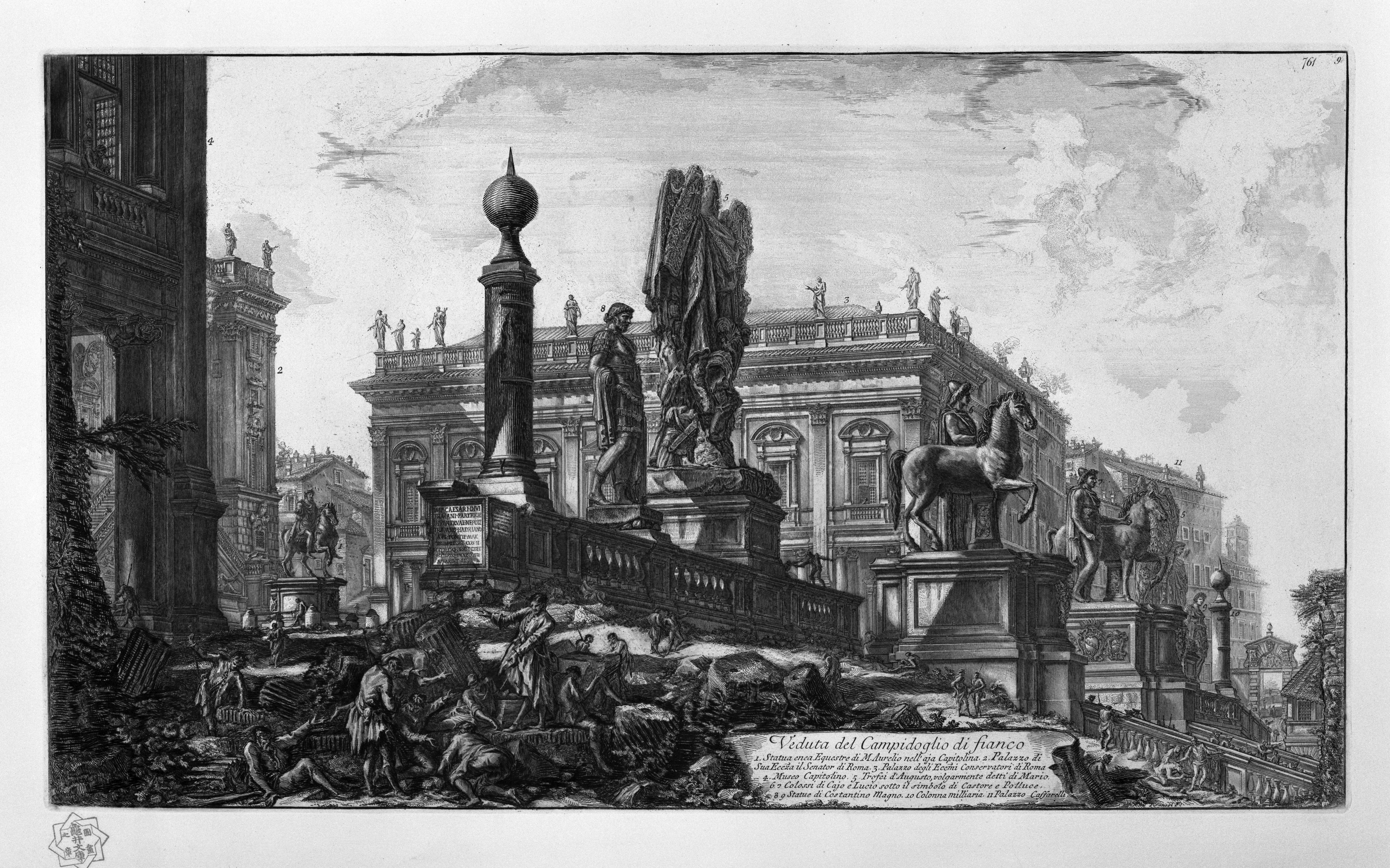
18th century engraving by Giovanni Battista Piranesi, showing the orb on a column

== Other statues of Constantine in Rome ==
Contemporary (4th century) smaller marble statues of Emperor Constantine can be seen at the entrance to the Quirinal Palace and in the narthex of the church of San Giovanni Laterano.
