= Colossus of Constantine =

4th-century acrolithic statue, 12 m. tall

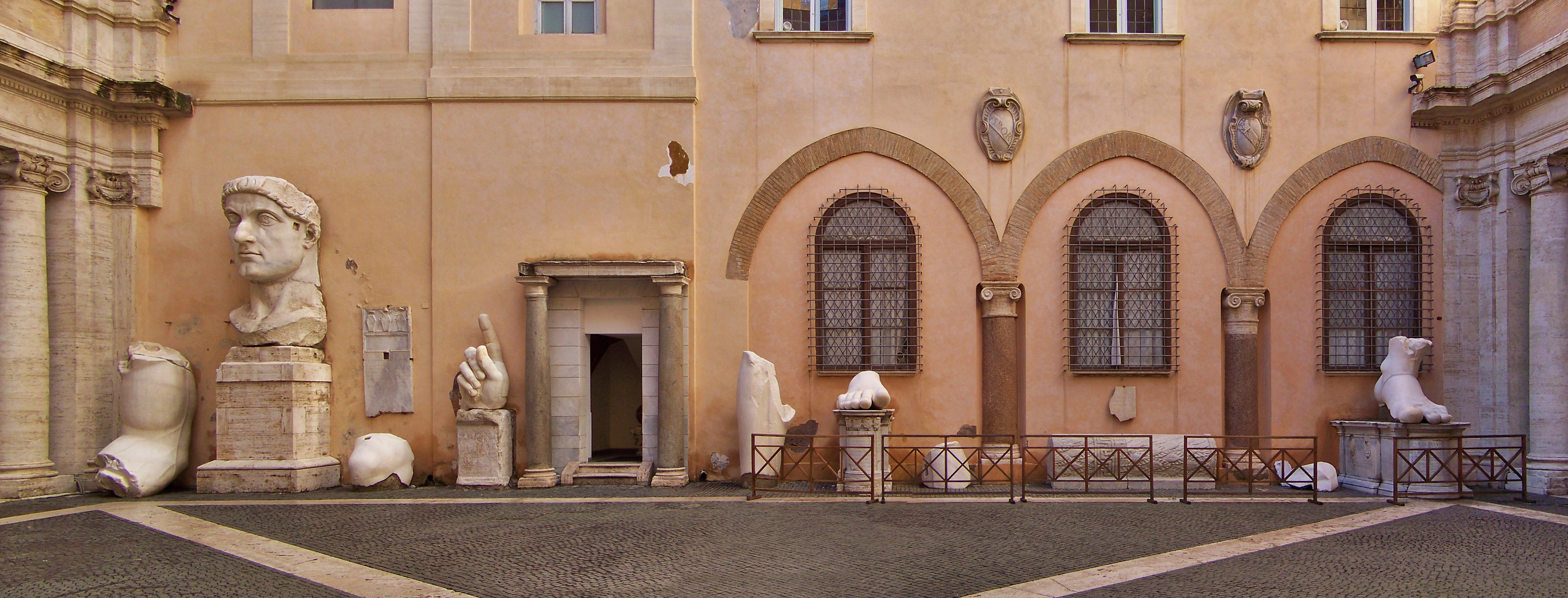
- Fragments of the Colossus of Constantine
- Click on the map for a fullscreen view
- Year: c. 312–315 AD
- Type: White marble, brick, wood, gilded bronze
- Location: Capitoline Museums, Rome, Italy
- 41°53′30″N 12°29′18″E

The Colossus of Constantine (Italian: Statua Colossale di Costantino I) was a monumental acrolithic statue depicting Constantine the Great (r. 25 July 306 AD – 22 May 337 AD) that occupied the apse of the Basilica of Maxentius in the early 4th century. Surviving fragments of the Colossus are now on display in the courtyard of the Palazzo dei Conservatori as part of the Capitoline Museums.

== Description ==
The great head, arms and legs of the Colossus were carved from white marble, while the rest of the body consisted of a brick core and wooden framework, possibly covered with gilded bronze. Judging by the size of the remaining pieces, the seated, enthroned figure would have been about 12 meters (40 feet) high. The head is about 2 1/2 meters tall and each foot is over 2 meters long.

The statue's right hand is said by Eusebius to have held "a trophy of the Saviour's passion with the saving sign of the Cross", possibly therefore in the form of a staff with the Chi Rho affixed to it. Medals minted by Constantine at about this time show him so decorated. Eusebius further records the Latin inscription engraved below the statue, which may be translated as follows:

Through this sign of salvation, which is the true symbol of goodness, I rescued your city and freed it from the tyrant's yoke, and through my act of liberation I restored the Senate and People of Rome to their ancient renown and splendour.

The great head is carved in a typical, abstract, Constantinian style ('hieratic emperor style') of late Roman portrait statues, whereas the other body parts are naturalistic, even down to callused toes and bulging forearm veins. The head was perhaps meant to convey the transcendence of the other-worldly nature of the Emperor over the human sphere, notable in its larger-than-life-size eyes which gaze toward eternity from a rigidly impersonal, frontal face. The treatment of the head shows a synthesis of individualistic portraiture: aquiline nose, deep jaw and prominent chin characteristic of all images of Constantine, with the trends of late Roman portraiture which focus on symbolism and abstraction rather than detail.

In this great public work, Constantine is portrayed in unapproachable grandeur, like the effigy of a god, although he is really intended to reflect the Christian deity. According to the classicist Michael Grant:

Here was the man at whose court...writers felt it appropriate to speak of the 'Divine Face' and 'Sacred Countenance'. The sculptor has conceived this countenance as a holy mask, an overpowering cult object resembling, though on a far greater scale, the icons of future Byzantium: an idol animated with the divine presence, and with the power to repel the demons lurking in pagan images.

Fragments in the Palazzo dei Conservatori

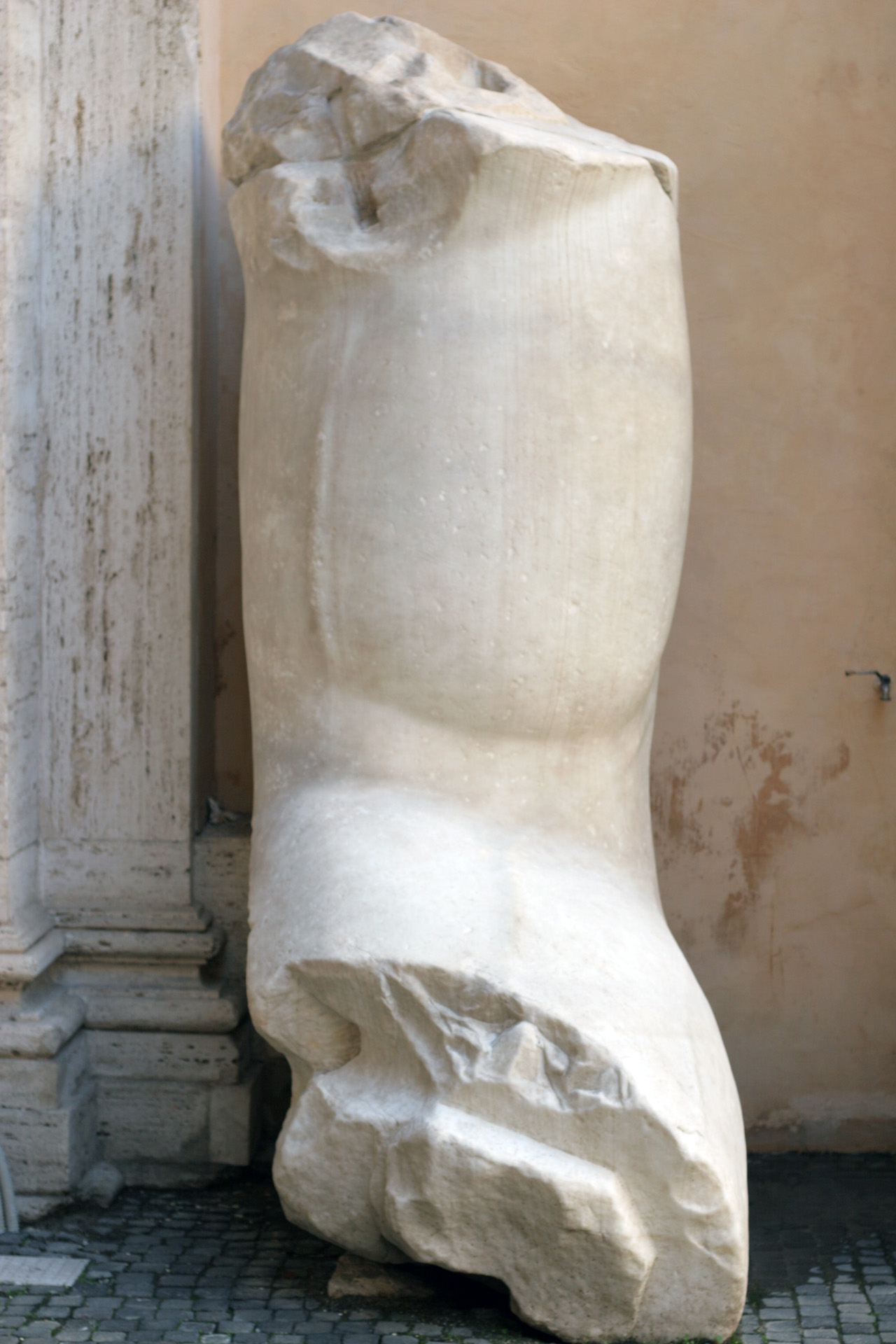
Right arm and elbow

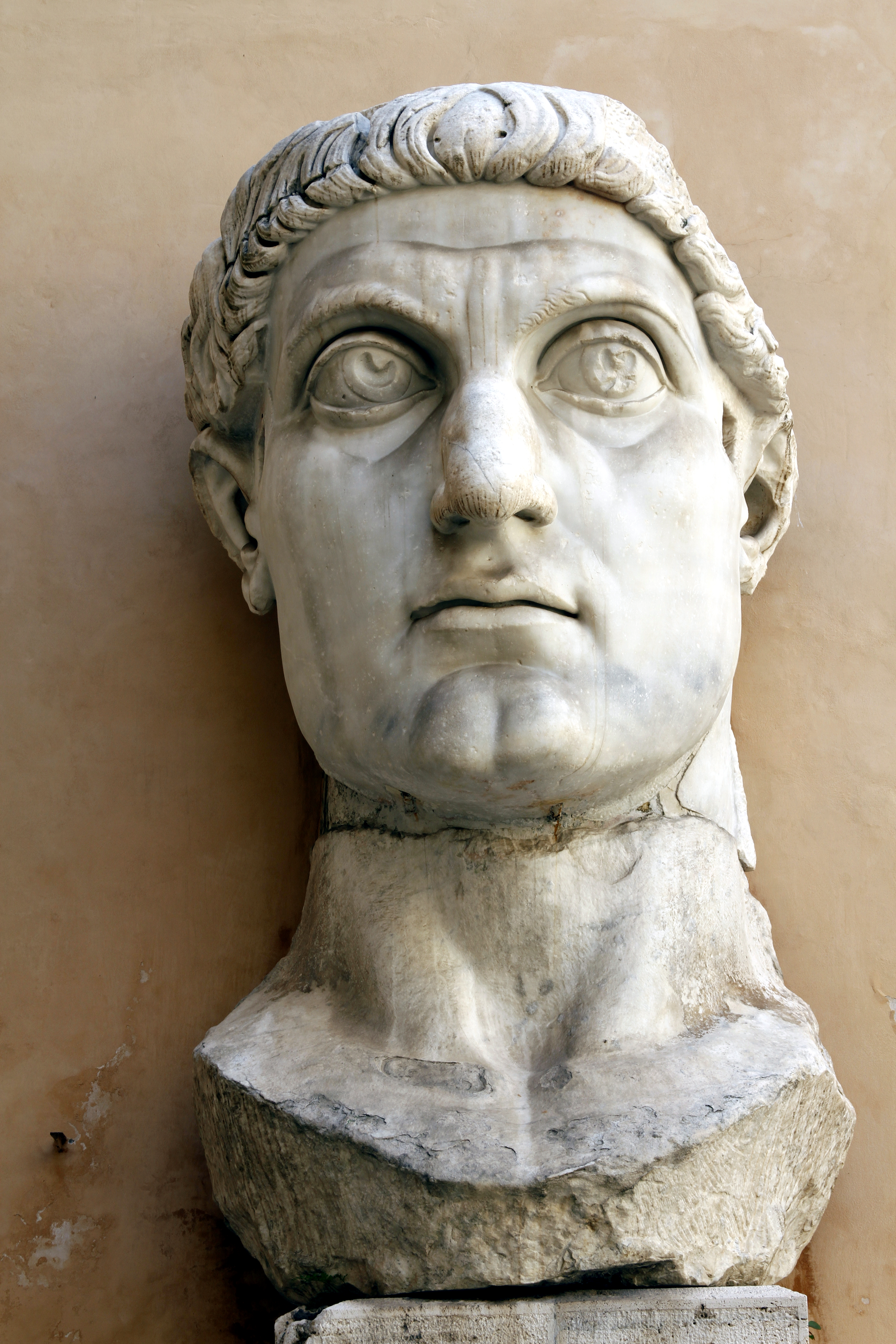
Head

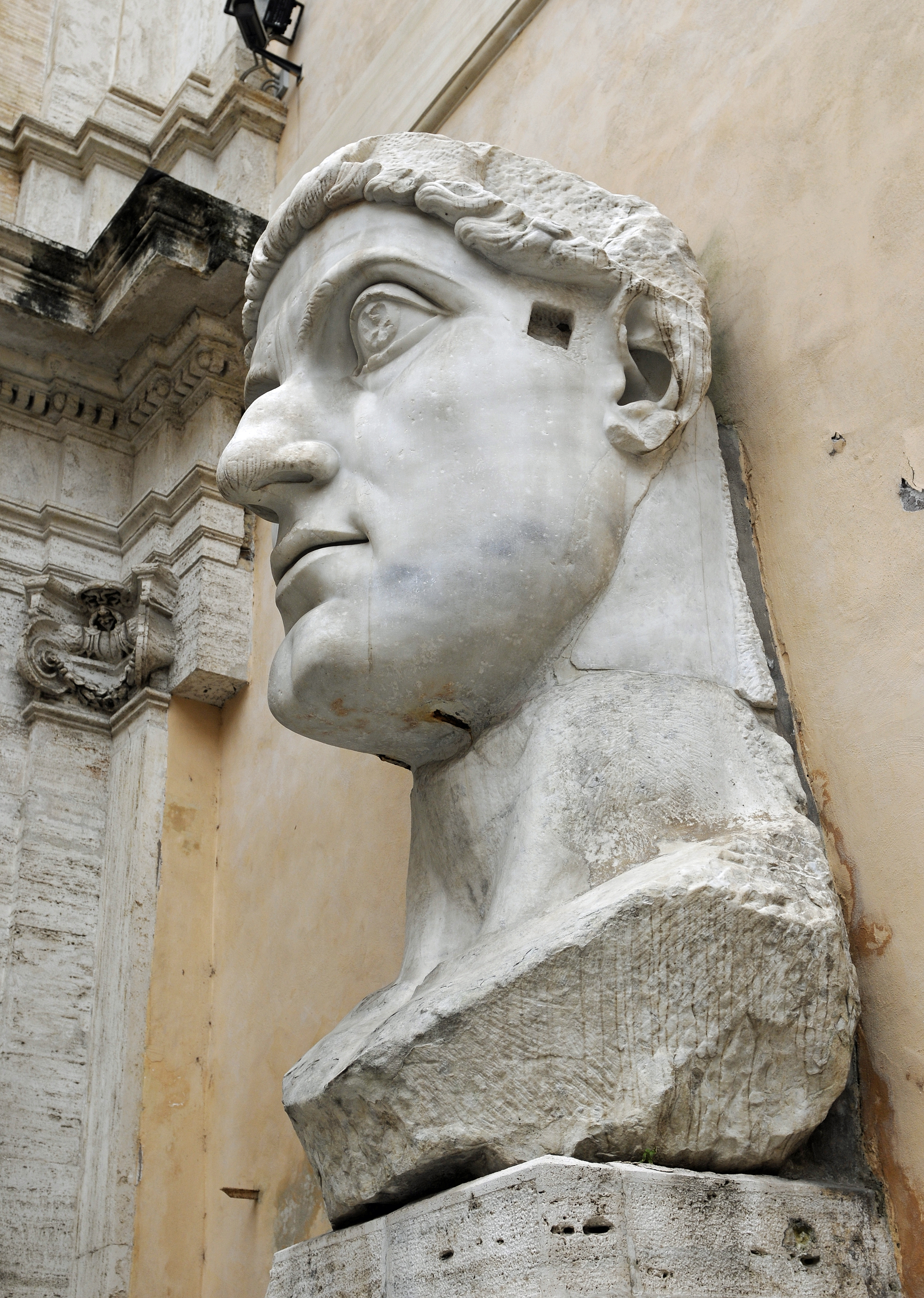
Head, side view

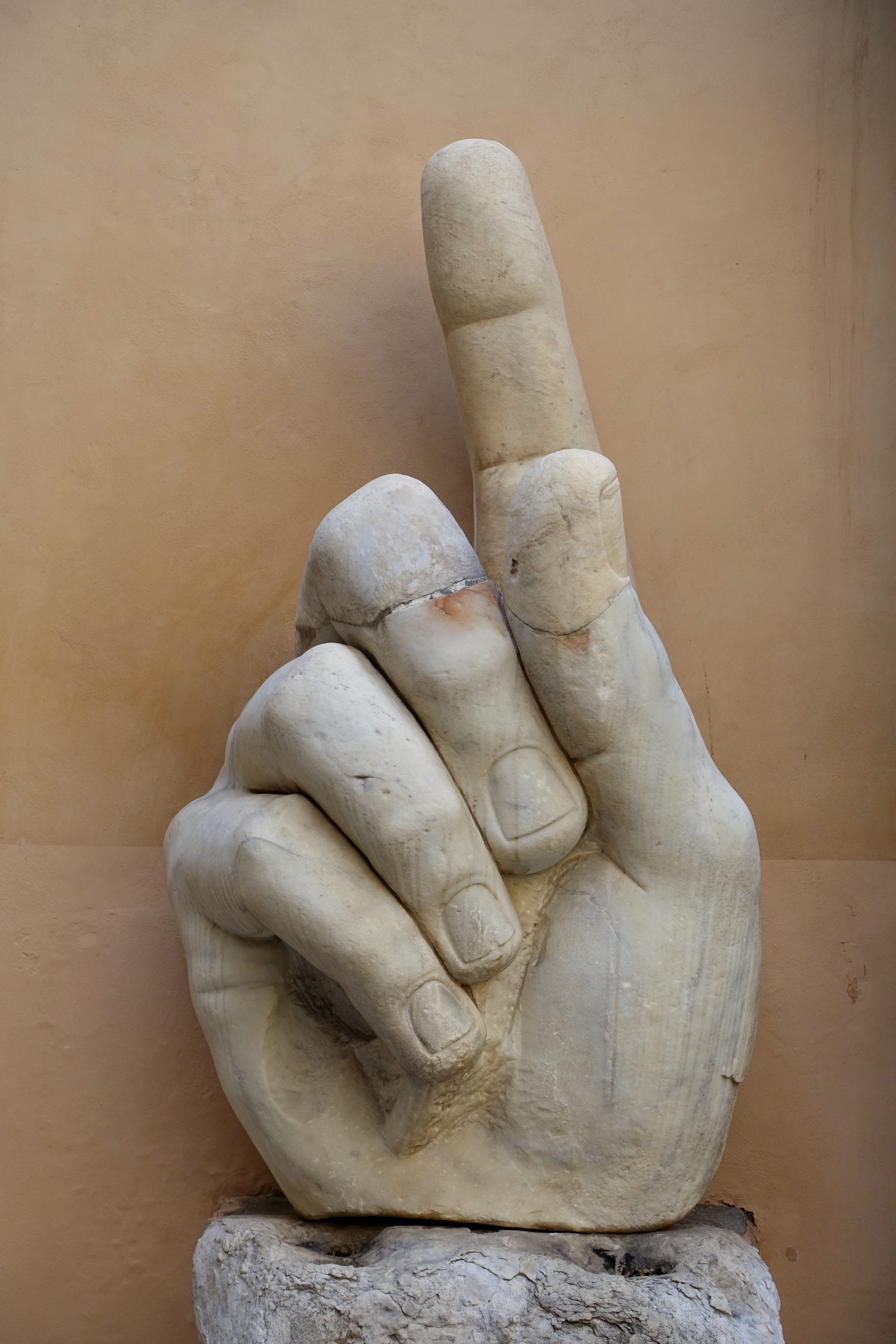
Right hand

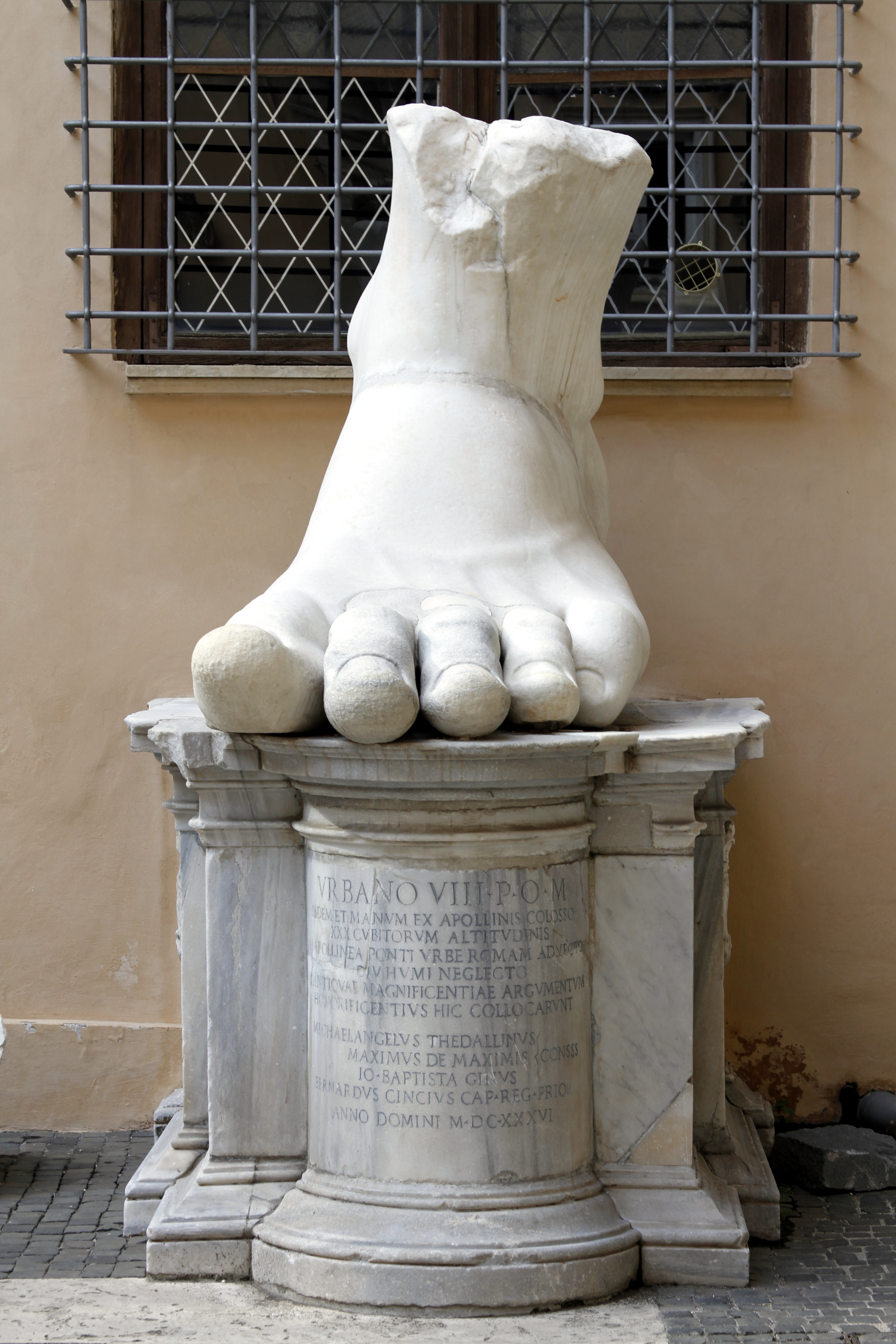
Left foot

== History ==
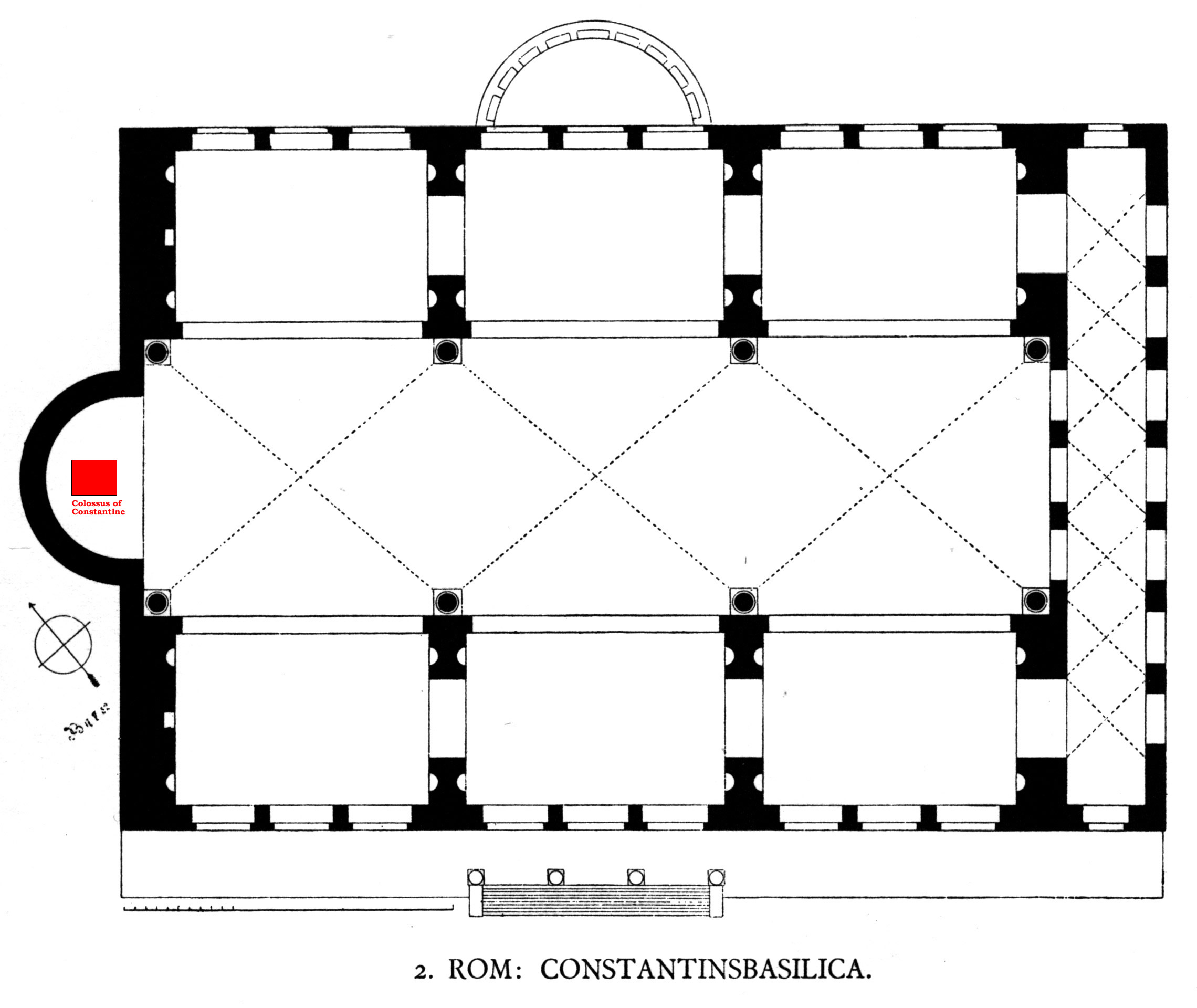
Plan of the Basilica of Maxentius with the location of the Colossus in red.

The Basilica of Maxentius, on the northern boundary of the Forum, was begun in 307 by co-Emperor Maxentius. Constantine completed the Basilica after he defeated Maxentius at the Battle of the Milvian Bridge in 312. Constantine seems to have reoriented the building, changing the site of the principal entrance and adding a new northern apse. With these changes, including the great statue in the west apse, Constantine publicly and visibly declared his overthrow of his vanquished adversary. Precise dating of the statue itself is problematical; it has been suggested that a date of 312–315 for the initial creation of the statue is likely from political considerations, whilst a substantial reworking of the features some time after 325 is indicated on art-historical grounds.

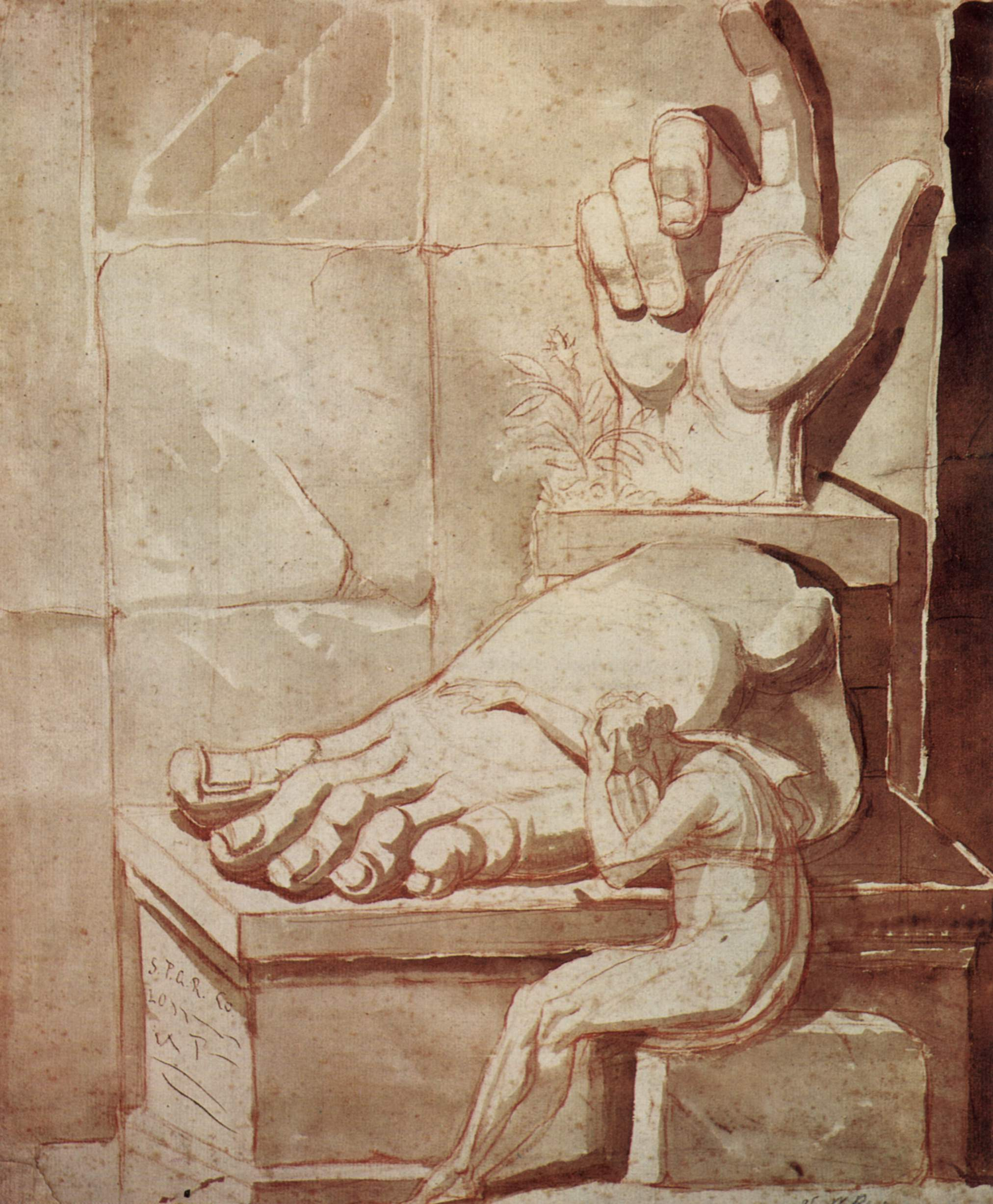
Henry Fuseli. The Artist's Despair Before the Grandeur of Ancient Ruins, 1778–1780.

The Colossus was pillaged sometime in Late Antiquity, most likely for the bronze body portions. The marble portions of the statue were brought to light in 1486. The surviving remnants were later removed from the Basilica and placed in the nearby Palazzo dei Conservatori Courtyard by Michelangelo, who was working in the area. Strangely, there are two right hands (with upraised index fingers) amongst the remains of the statue, which differ slightly. It has been proposed that the statue was re-worked at some time late in Constantine's reign and a hand holding a sceptre was replaced by a hand holding a Christian symbol.

The marble fragments underwent restoration during 2000–2001. Between 6 and 10 February 2006, a 3D laser scan of the fragments was carried out on behalf of the Land of Rhineland-Palatinate in collaboration with the Capitoline Museums in Rome. Both reconstruction and castings were displayed from 2 June to 4 November 2007 as part of the major cultural and historical "Constantine the Great" Exhibition in Trier, Germany.

== Reconstruction ==
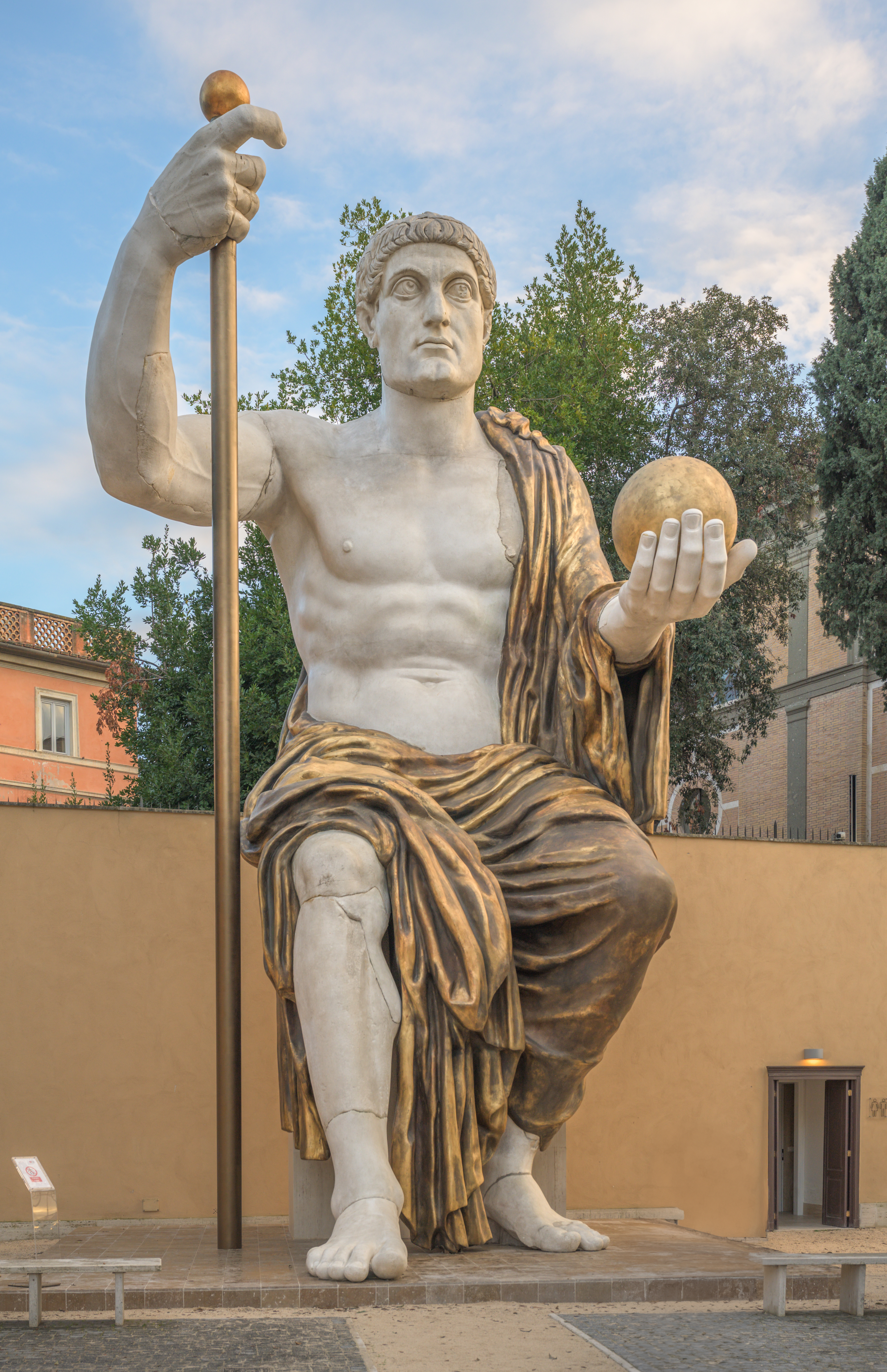
Reconstructed version at the Capitoline Museum in 2024

In March 2022, researchers at the Factum Foundation of Digital Technology and Preservation used photogrammetry and LiDAR technology to create three-dimensional models of the surviving fragments of the Colossus. In collaboration with the Capitoline Museums, the team reconstructed the statue's original form, measuring approximately 13 m (42 ft 8 in) in height, based on technical analysis of the fragments, supported by historical and epigraphic sources. Elements derived from the surviving fragments were reproduced as facsimiles and visually distinguished from the reconstructed portions of the statue.

The completed reconstruction was first displayed at the exhibition Recycling Beauty at the Fondazione Prada from 17 November 2022 – 27 February 2023, curated by Salvatore Settis. On 6 February 2024, it was installed in the gardens of the Villa Caffarelli as part of the Capitoline Museums.

== See also ==
- Bronze colossus of Constantine
- Head of Constantine the Great, York
- Statue of Constantine the Great, York

| Preceded by Augustus of Prima Porta | Landmarks of Rome; Colossus of Constantine | Succeeded by Bocca della Verità |
