= The Artist's Despair Before the Grandeur of Ancient Ruins =

Drawing by Henry Fuseli

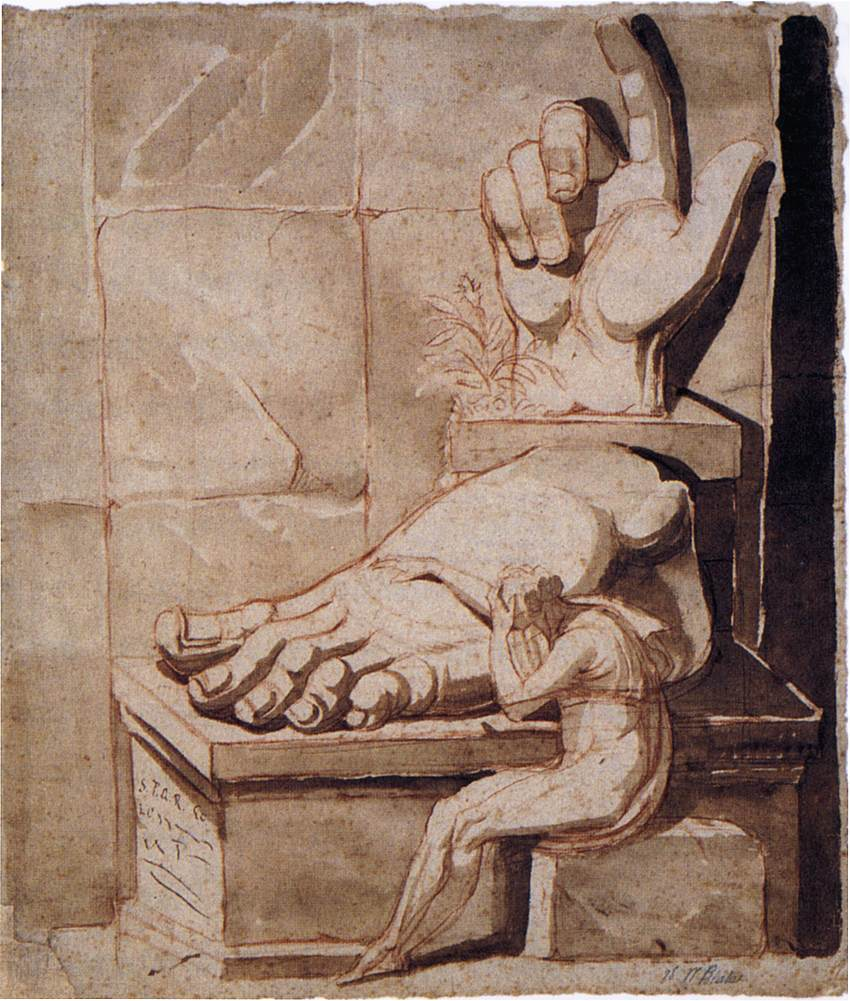
The artist's despair before the grandeur of ancient ruins by Johann Heinrich Füssli

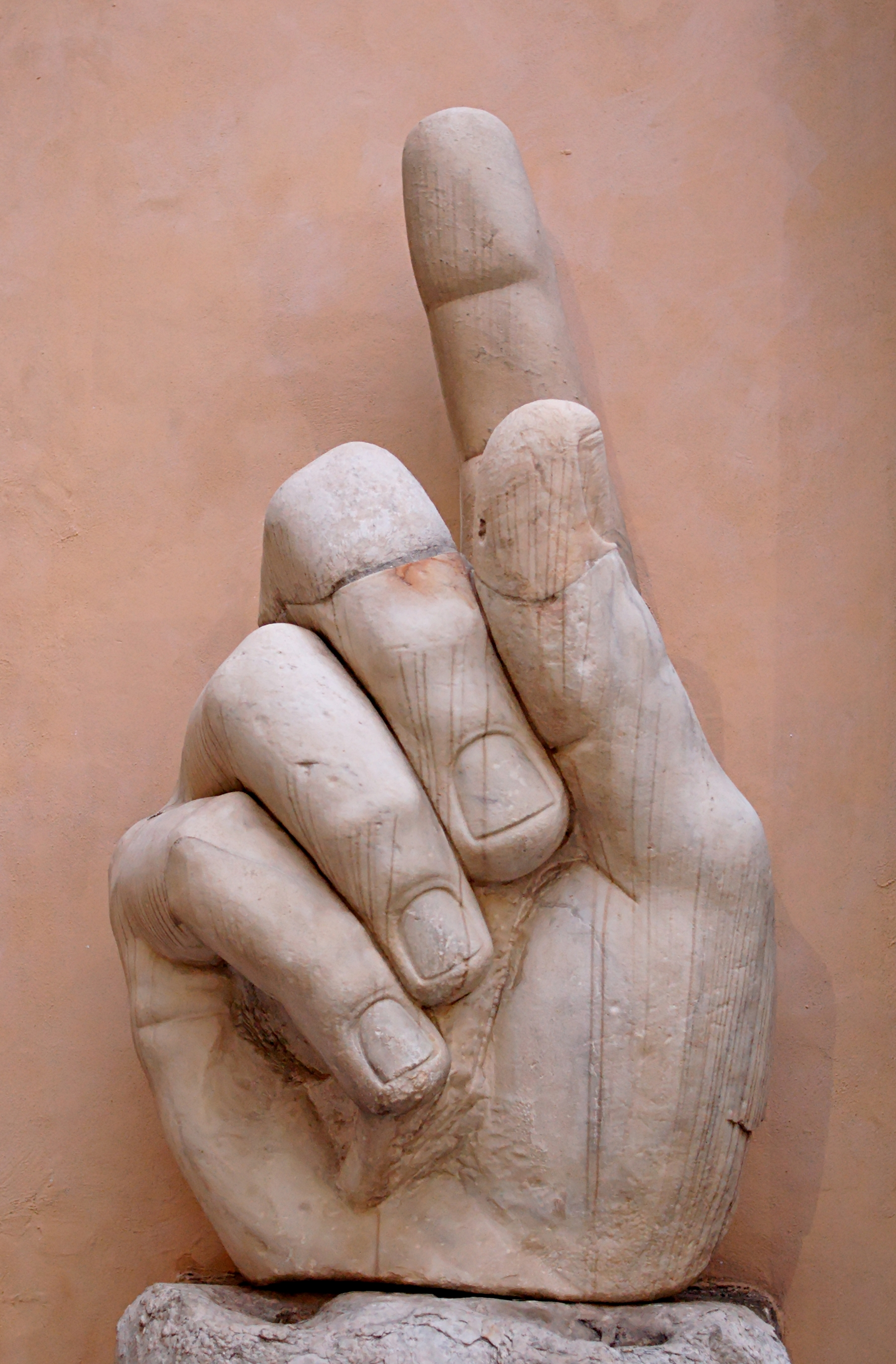
Hand of the Colossus of Constantine

The Artist's Despair Before the Grandeur of Ancient Ruins (German: Der Künstler verzweifelnd vor der Grösse der antiken Trümmer) is a drawing in red chalk with brown wash executed between 1778 and 1780 by the Swiss artist Henry Fuseli. It depicts an artist's response to ruins, namely those of the Colossus of Constantine at the Capitoline Museums in Rome. The work was acquired by the Kunsthaus Zürich in 1940.

The artist's despair may be caused by "the impossibility of emulating the greatness of the past", by the knowledge that all things must decay, or by a sense of unfulfilled longing and dislocation. Distortions of perspective and the "plunge into the abyss" along the right edge conjure up a sense of nightmare. SPQR may be read in the inscription on the base of the foot, while vegetation sprouts up near the hand; the artist, in a "fit of melancholy", is dwarfed by the fragments of the past.

Art historian Linda Nochlin saw the artist portrayed in the drawing as "not merely 'overwhelmed' but ... in mourning, mourning a terrible loss ... ten years before the outbreak of the French Revolution.... Out of this loss is constructed the Modern itself".

== See also ==
- Classicism
- Romanticism
- Roman sculpture
- The Anxiety of Influence
