= Basilica of Maxentius =

Ancient Roman civic basilica in Rome

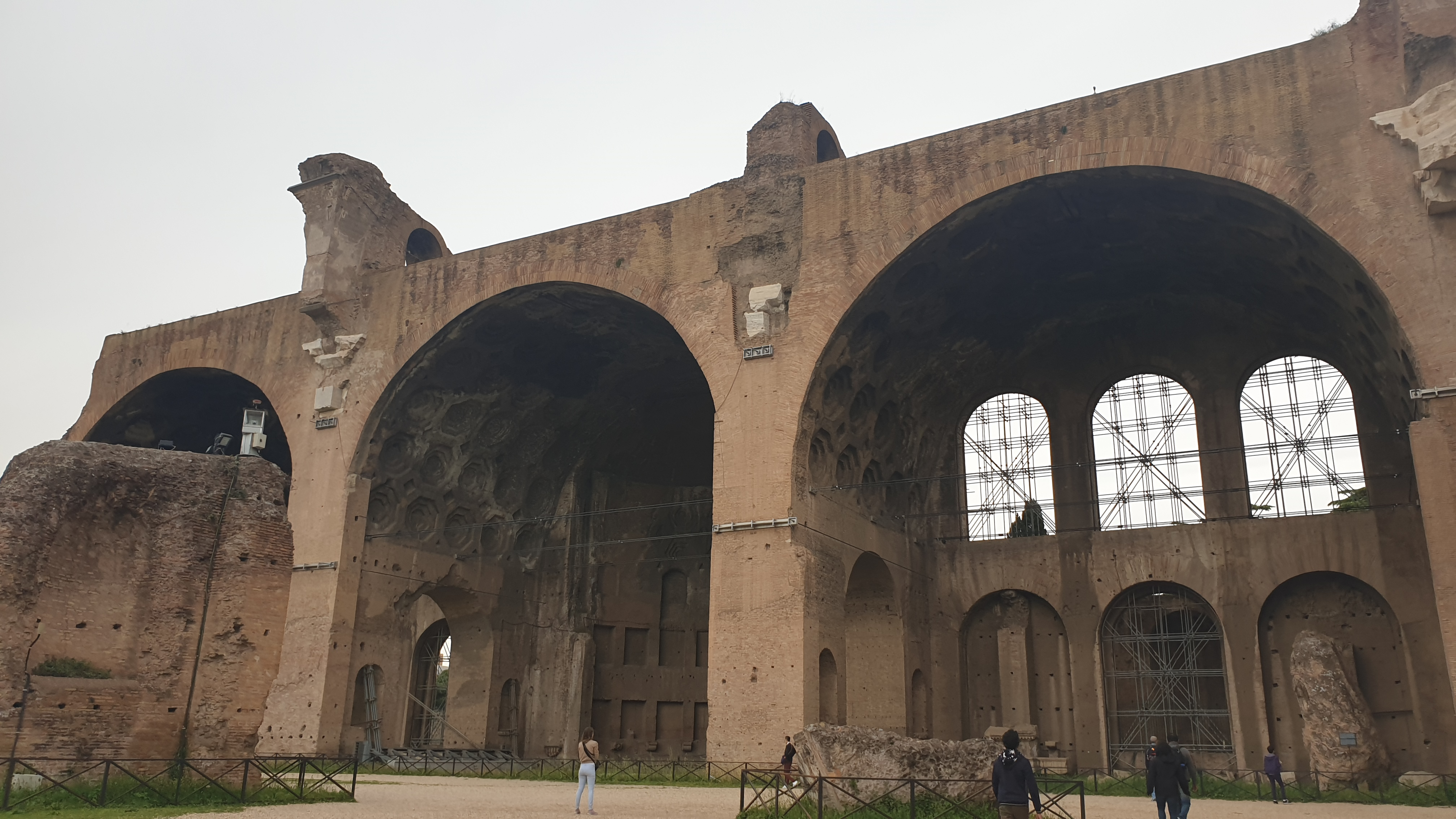
- Remains of the Basilica of Maxentius and Constantine. The building's northern aisle is all that remains.

- Shown within Augustan Rome
- Click on the map for a fullscreen view
- 41°53′31″N 12°29′18″E
- Type: Basilica
- Location: Regio IV Templum Pacis

History
- Built: AD 312
- Built by: Maxentius, Constantine I

The Basilica of Maxentius (Italian: Basilica di Massenzio), sometimes known by its original Latin name, Basilica Nova or, less commonly, the Basilica of Constantine (Italian: Basilica Constantini), was a civic basilica in the Roman Forum. At the time of its construction, it was the largest building in the Forum, and the last Roman basilica built in the city.

== History ==
In ancient Rome, a basilica was a rectangular building with a large central open space, and often a raised apse at the far end from the entrance. Basilicas served a variety of functions, including a combination of a courthouse, council chamber and meeting hall. There might be, however, numerous statues of the gods displayed in niches set into the walls. Under Constantine and his successors this type of building was chosen as the basis for the design of the larger places of Christian worship, presumably as the basilica form had fewer pagan associations than those of the designs of traditional Greco-Roman temples, and allowed large congregations. As a result of the building programmes of the Christian Roman emperors the term basilica later became largely synonymous with a large church or cathedral.

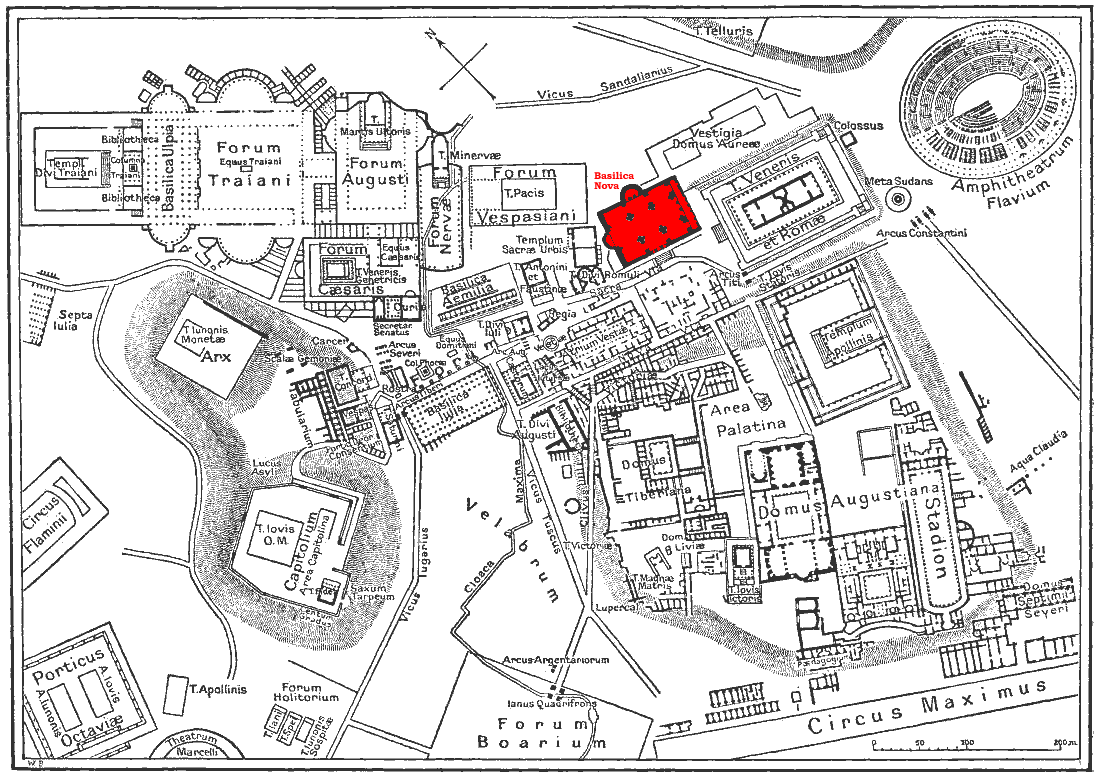
Location of the basilica in the Roman Forum.

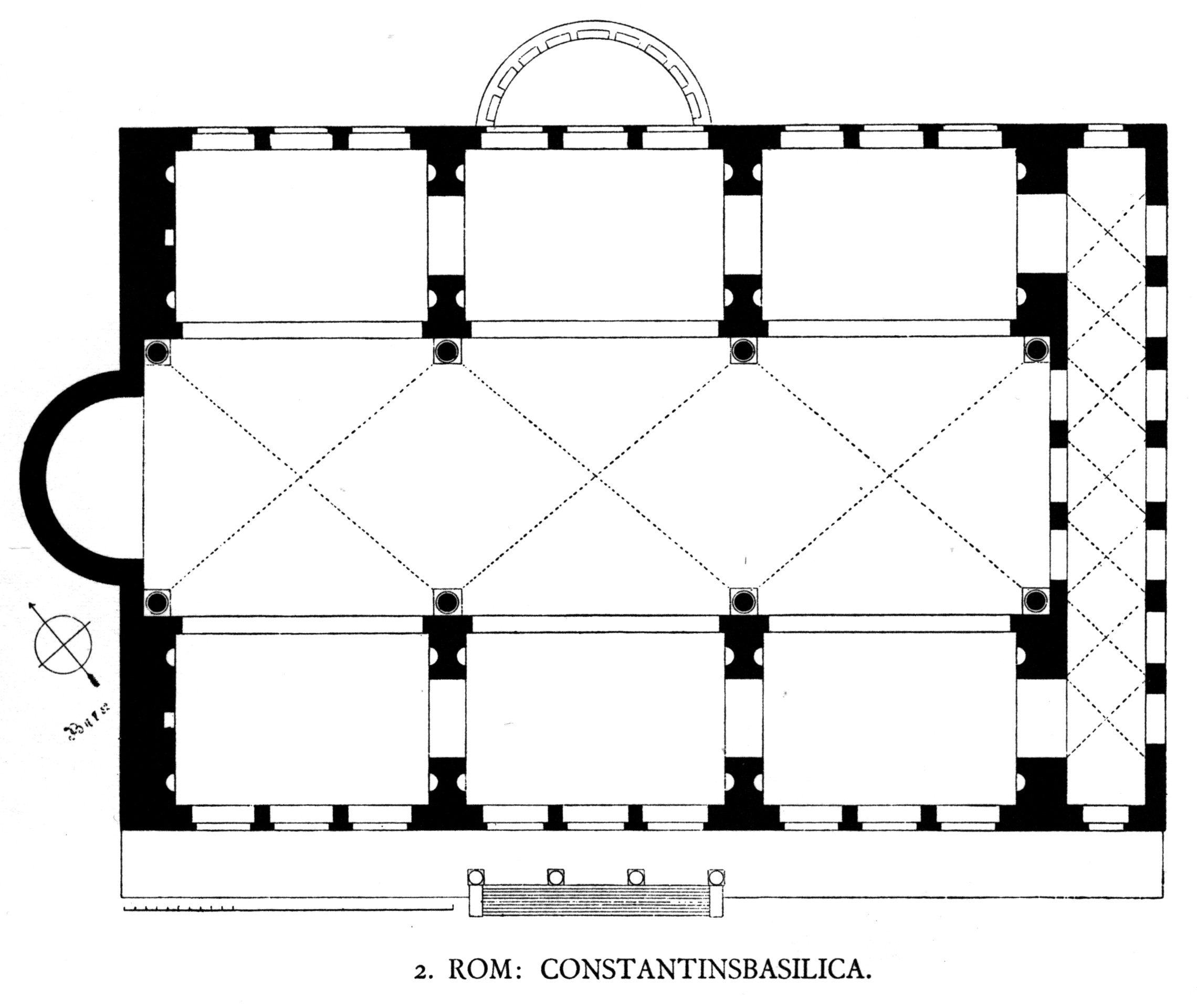
Reconstruction of the plan.

Construction began on the northern side of the forum under the emperor Maxentius in 308 AD, and was completed in 312 by Constantine I after his defeat of Maxentius at the Battle of the Milvian Bridge. The building rose on the north side of the Via Sacra, close to the Temple of Peace, at that time probably neglected, and the Temple of Venus and Rome, whose reconstruction was part of Maxentius' interventions.

During the 6th century, the building was called "templum Romae".

== Architecture ==
The colour of the building before it was destroyed was white. The basilica stood on a 100-by-65-metre (328 ft × 213 ft) concrete and rectangular platform. The thickness of the platform is not known/communicated. The central nave was 80 metres (260 ft) long, 25 metres (82 ft) wide, 35 metres (115 ft) high, with side aisles 16 metres (52 ft) wide and 24.5 metres (80 ft) high. Eight massive marble columns 14.5 metres (48 ft) high and 5.4 metres (18 ft) in circumference stood at the corners of the nave. They were all destroyed except one that was removed by Paul V in 1613 to the Santa Maria Maggiore where it still stands.

The building consisted of a central nave covered by three groin vaults suspended 39 metres (128 ft) above the floor on four large piers, ending in an apse at the western end containing a colossal statue of Constantine (remnants of which are now in a courtyard of the Palazzo dei Conservatori of the Musei Capitolini). The lateral forces of the groin vaults were held by flanking aisles measuring 23 by 17 metres (75 ft × 56 ft). The aisles were spanned by three semi-circular barrel vaults perpendicular to the nave, and narrow arcades ran parallel to the nave beneath the barrel vaults. The nave itself measured 25 by 80 metres (82 ft × 262 ft) creating a 2,000-square-metre (22,000 sq ft) floor. Like the great imperial baths, the basilica made use of vast interior space with its emotional effect. Running the length of the eastern face of the building was a projecting arcade. On the south face was a projecting (prostyle) porch with four columns (tetrastyle).

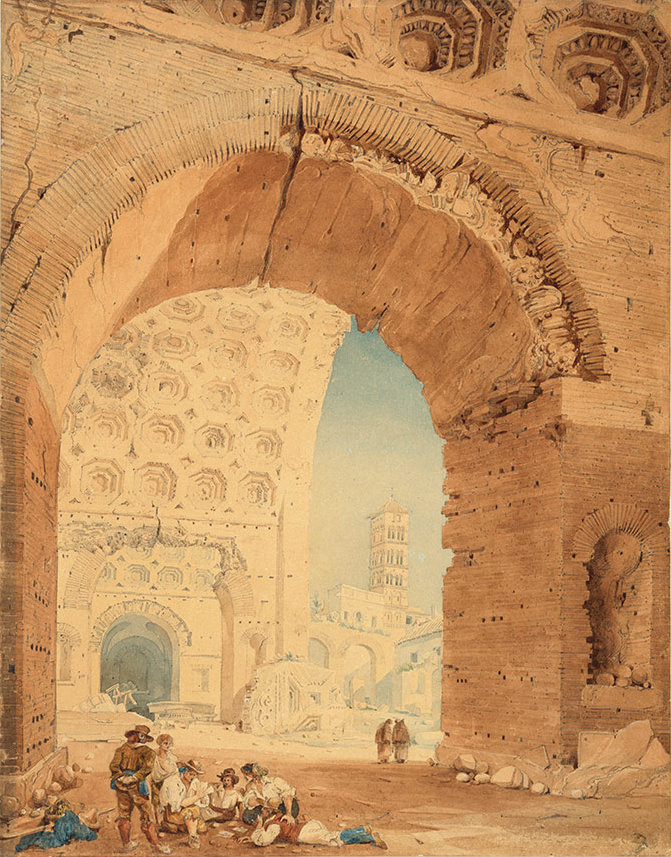
John Goldicutt, View in Rome, 1820. Watercolor over pencil. The Huntington Library, Art Collections, and Botanical Gardens, Gilbert Davis Collection.

The south and central sections were probably destroyed by the earthquake of 847. In 1349 the vault of the nave collapsed in another earthquake. The only one of the eight 20-metre (66 ft) high columns that survived the earthquake was brought by Pope Paul V to Piazza Santa Maria Maggiore in 1614. All that remains of the basilica today is the north aisle with its three concrete barrel vaults. The ceilings of the barrel vaults show advanced weight-saving structural skill with octagonal ceiling coffers.

On the outside wall of the basilica, facing onto the via dei Fori Imperiali, are contemporary maps showing the various stages of the rise of the Roman Empire which were added during the Fascist regime of Benito Mussolini. A map depicting Mussolini's "New Roman Empire" was removed from the wall after the war. The wrestling events were held here during the 1960 Summer Olympic Games.

== Engineering ==
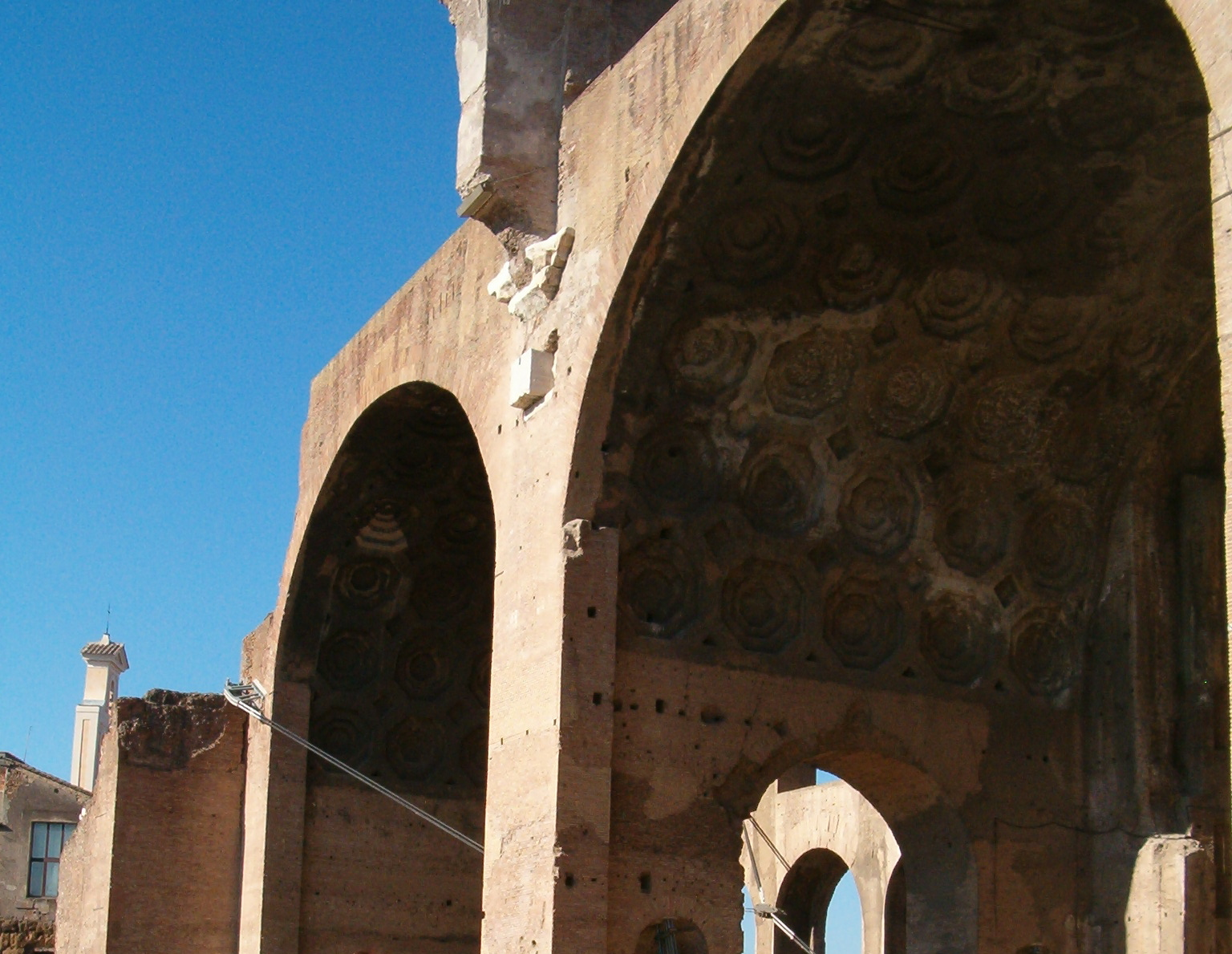
Detail of the coffered vaults of concrete

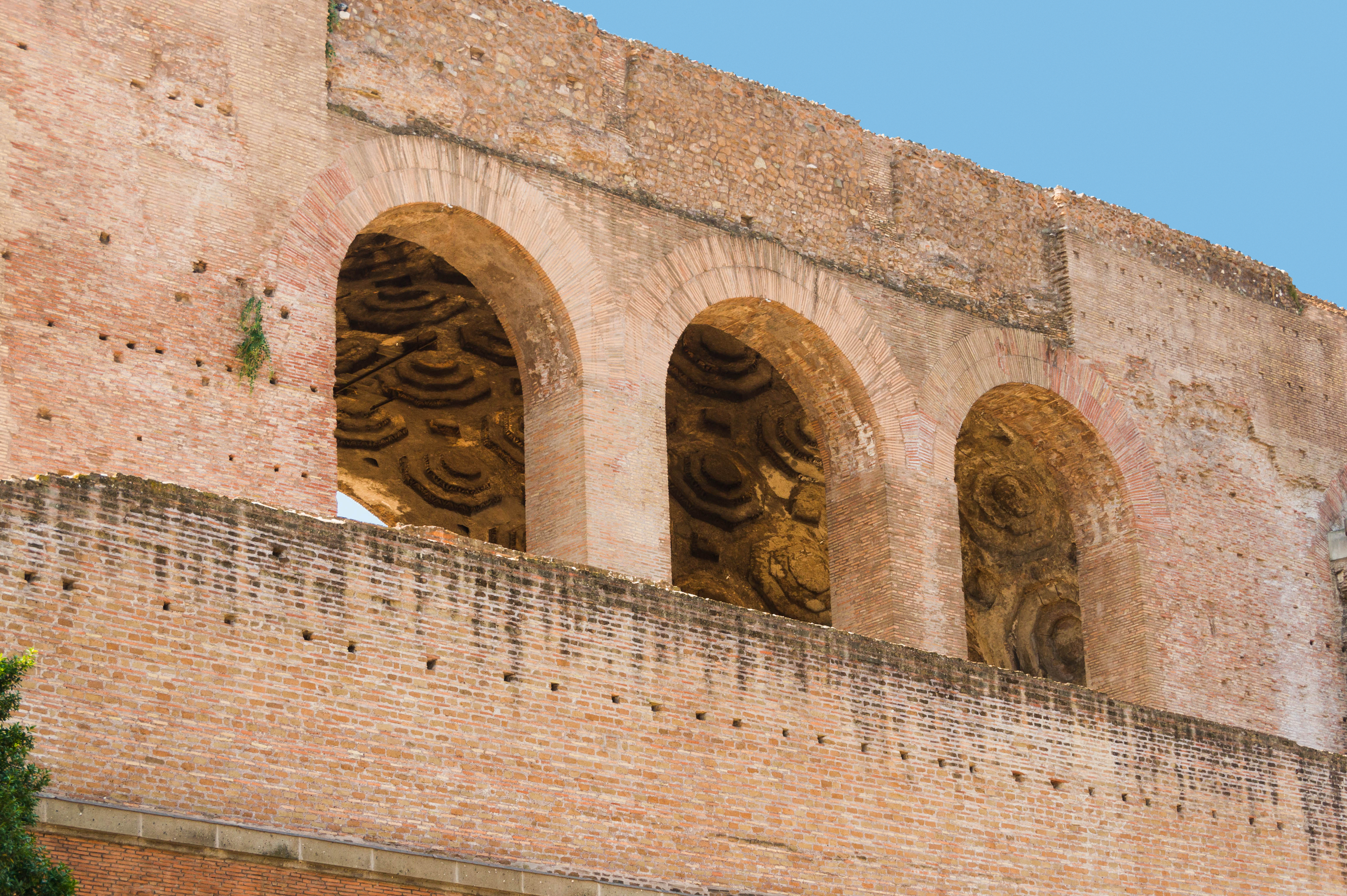
Triple windows seen from the Via dei Fori Imperiali

The basilica of Maxentius took aspects from Roman baths as well as typical Roman basilicas. At that time, it used the most advanced engineering techniques known including innovations taken from the Markets of Trajan and the Baths of Diocletian.

Similar to many basilicas at the time such as the Basilica Ulpia, the Basilica of Maxentius featured a huge open space in the central nave. However, instead of having columns support the ceiling like other basilicas, it was built using arches, a much more common feature in Roman baths than basilicas. Another difference from traditional basilicas is the roof of the structure. While the former were built with a flat roof, the Basilica of Maxentius featured a folded roof, decreasing the overall weight of the structure and decreasing the horizontal forces exerted on the outer arches.

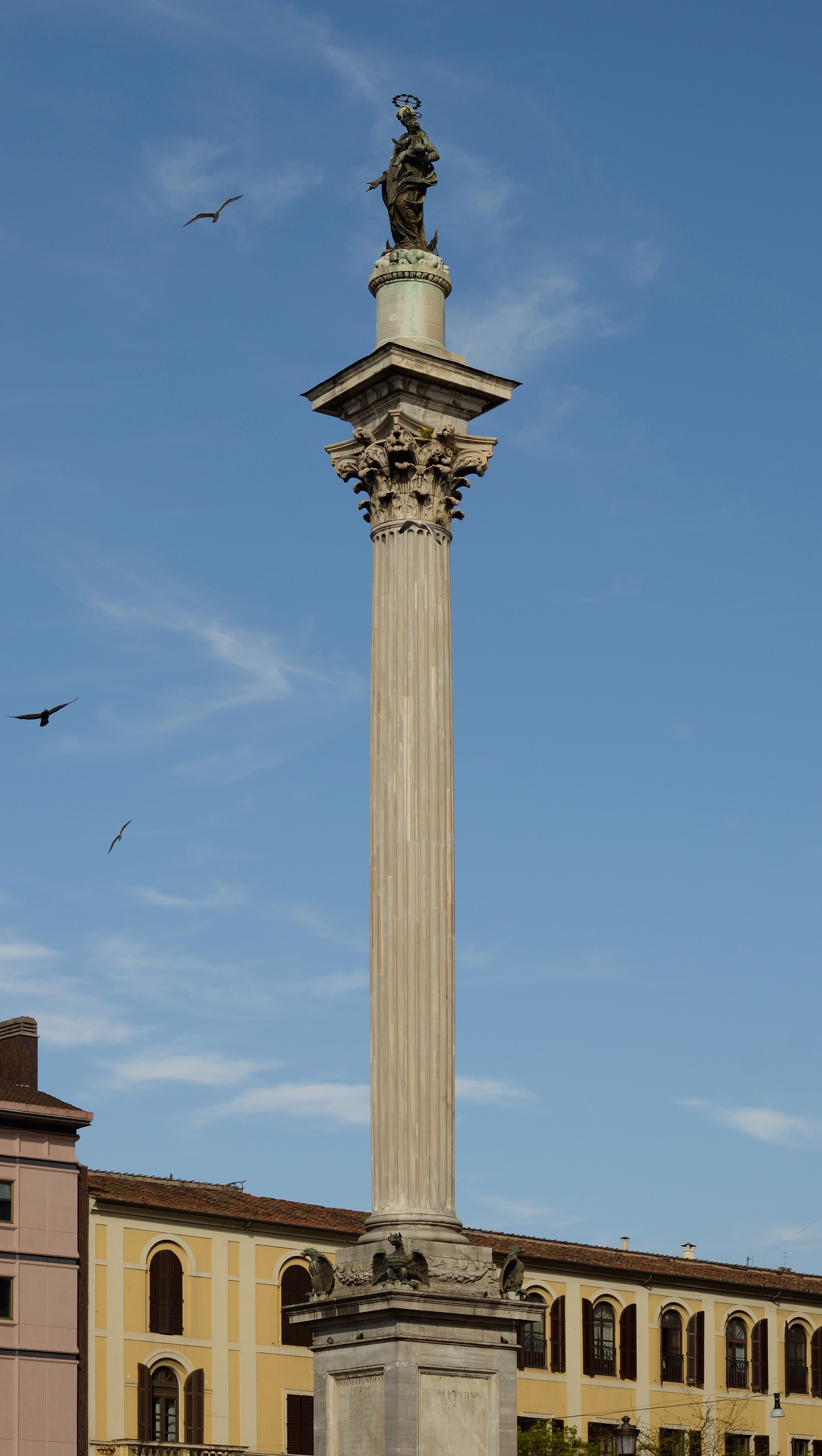
Column from the interior of the basilica, now the free-standing Colonna della Pace, outside Santa Maria Maggiore

== Legacy ==
The artist Giovanni Battista Piranesi (1720–1778) drew many etchings of the basilica.

The building became an inspiration for many buildings built afterwards, including New York City's former Penn Station.

== See also ==
- Colossus of Constantine, originally situated in the west apse of the Basilica.
- List of monuments of the Roman Forum

== Sources ==
- 1960 Summer Olympics official report. Volume 1. pp. 76, 79.
- The Roman Empire: From the Etruscans to the Decline of the Roman Empire, Henri Stierlin, TASCHEN, 2002, Edited by Silvia Kinkle, Cologne, ISBN 3-8228-1778-3

Preceded by Basilica of Junius Bassus	Landmarks of Rome; Basilica of Maxentius	Succeeded by Basilica of Neptune
