= Statue of Trajan, Tower Hill =

Statue on Tower Hill, London

Statue of Trajan
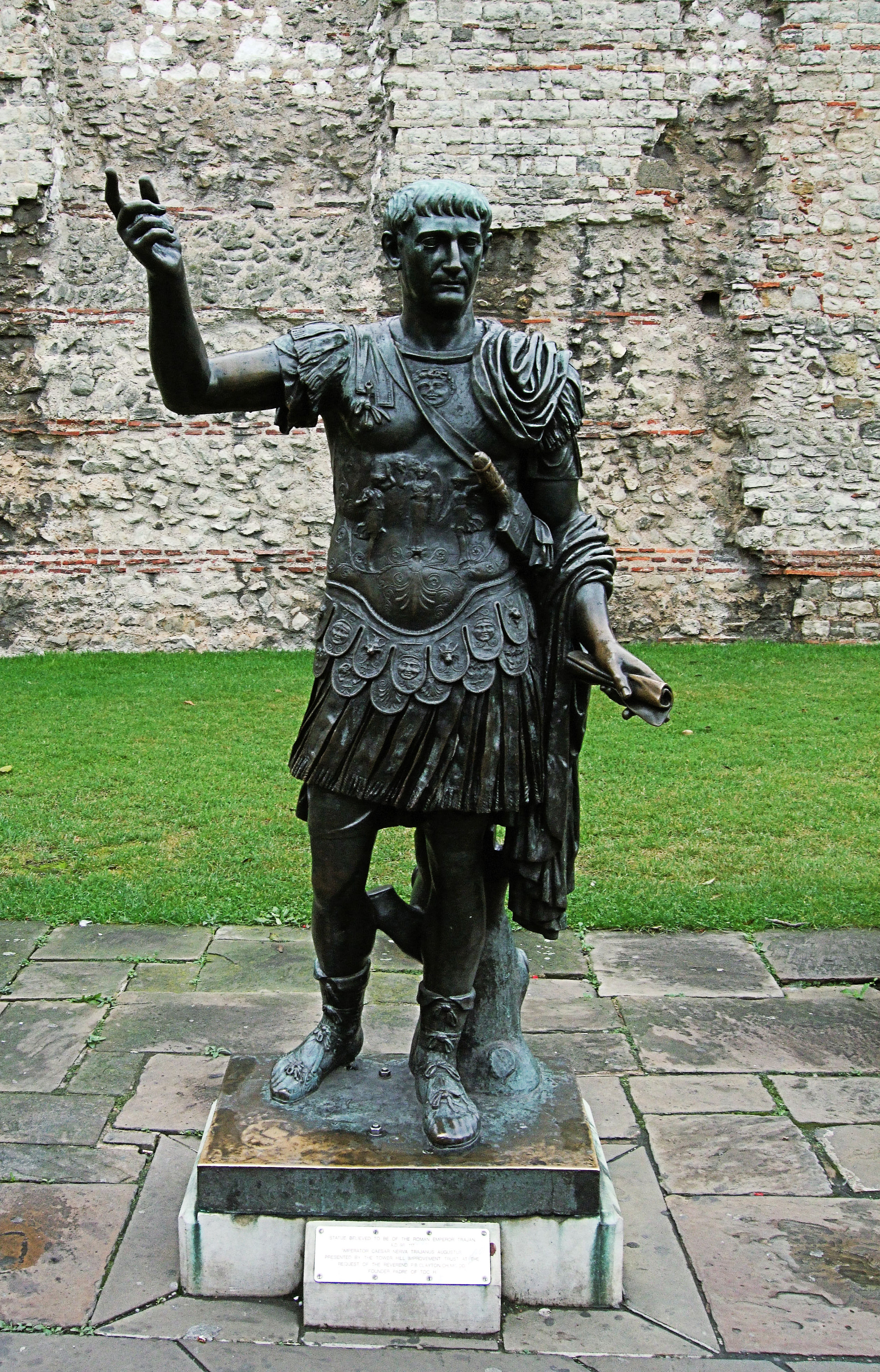
- Year: 1980 (erected)
- Medium: Bronze sculpture
- Subject: Trajan
- Location: London, United Kingdom; 51°30′36″N 0°04′34″W

The statue of Trajan is an outdoor twentieth-century bronze sculpture depicting the Roman Emperor Trajan, located in front of a section of the London Wall built by Romans, at Tower Hill in London, United Kingdom.

== Description ==
Trajan is shown bareheaded and wearing a tunic, holding a scroll in his left hand while gesturing with his right hand raised.

A plaque at its base contains the inscription:

STATUE BELIEVED TO BE OF THE ROMAN EMPEROR TRAJAN/ A.D. 98–117/ IMPERATOR CAESAR NERVA TRAJANUS AUGUSTUS/ PRESENTED BY THE TOWER HILL IMPROVEMENT TRUST AT THE/ REQUEST OF THE REVEREND P. B. CLAYTON, CH, MC, DD, /FOUNDER PADRE OF TOC H.

== History ==
The statue was installed in 1980 as a bequest from P. B. "Tubby" Clayton, the vicar of All Hallows-by-the-Tower. The Museum of London believes the figure to have been recovered from a scrapyard in Southampton in the 1920s, and notes that its head does not match its body. There is no information presented at the site about the sculptor.

It is a cast of a late 1st century statue found in Minturno, which is on display at the National Archaeological Museum in Naples. The upper part of the head is the result of restoration; other casts are in Rome (at the via dei Fori Imperiali and Museum of Roman Civilization), Ancona and Benevento.

Trajan presided over the second-greatest military expansion in Roman history, after Augustus, leading the empire to attain its maximum territorial extent by the time of his death. He never himself visited Britain.

== See also ==
- List of public art in the City of London
- Statue of Trajan, Rome
