= Statue of Julius Caesar =

Sculpture in Rome, Italy

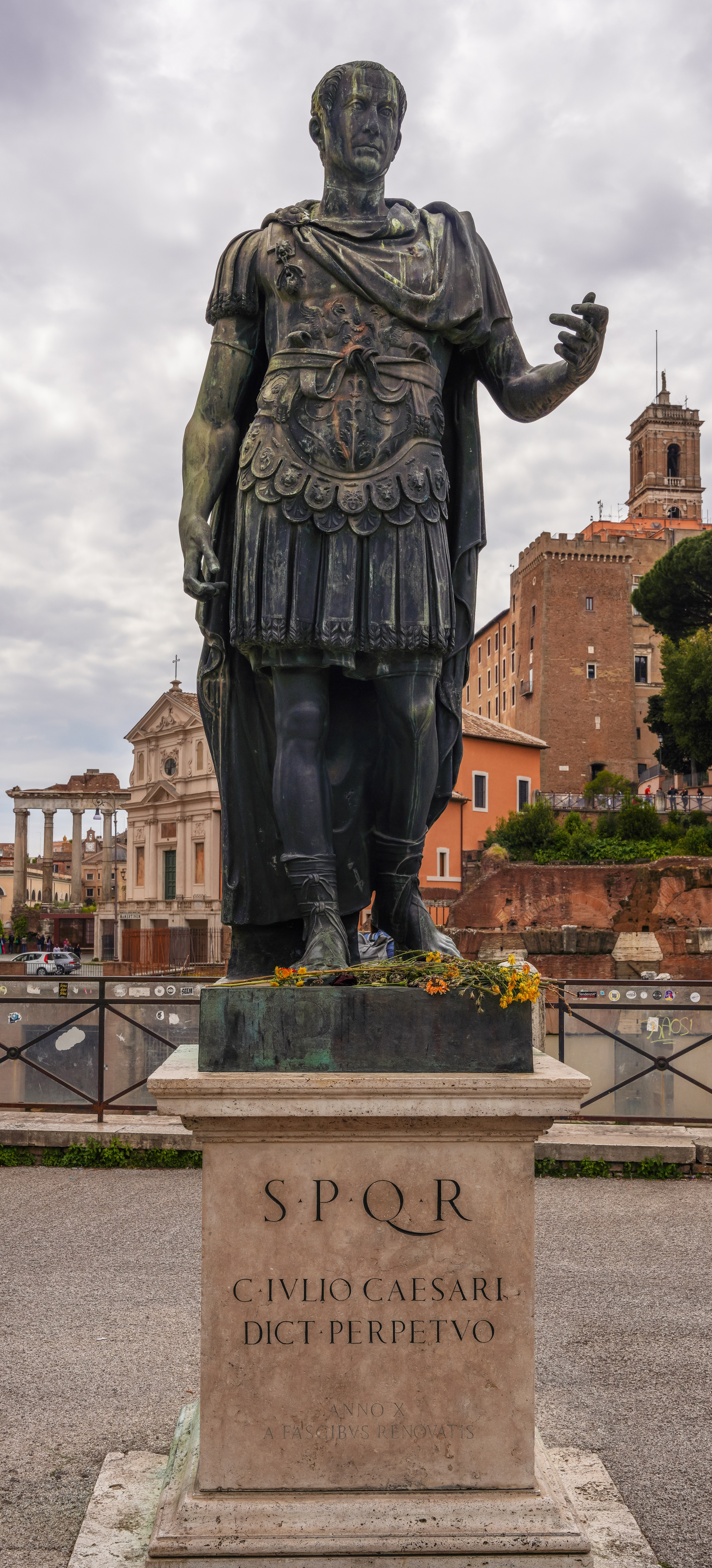
- The statue in 2022
- Subject: Julius Caesar
- Location: Rome, Italy

A statue of Julius Caesar is installed along Via dei Fori Imperiali in Rome, Italy.
