= Statue of Trajan, Rome =

Sculpture in Rome, Italy

Statue of Trajan
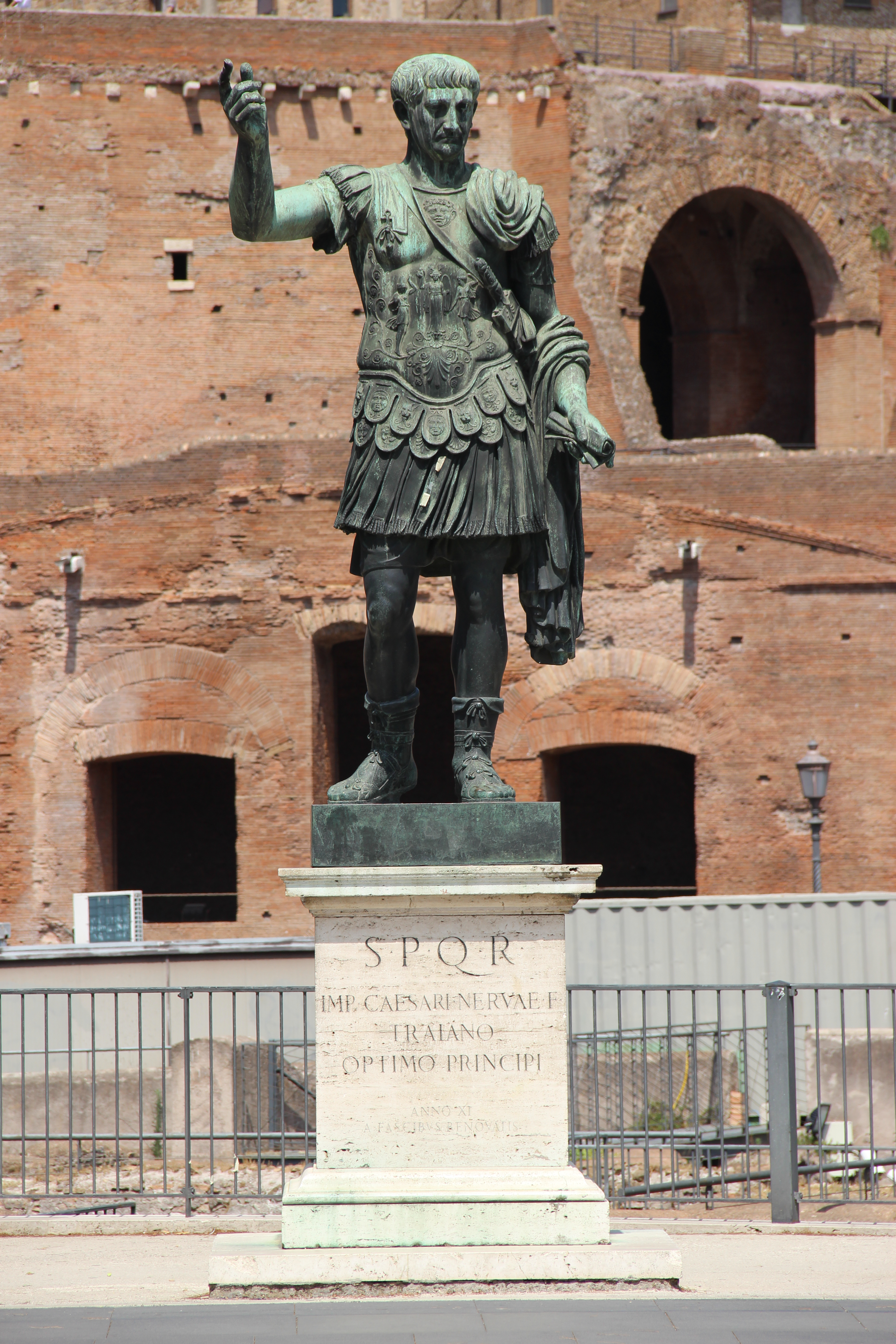
- The statue in 2019
- Subject: Trajan
- Location: Rome, Italy

A statue of Trajan is installed along Via dei Fori Imperiali in Rome, Italy.

== See also ==
- Statue of Trajan, Tower Hill
