= Forum of Nerva =

Ancient Roman imperial forum in Rome

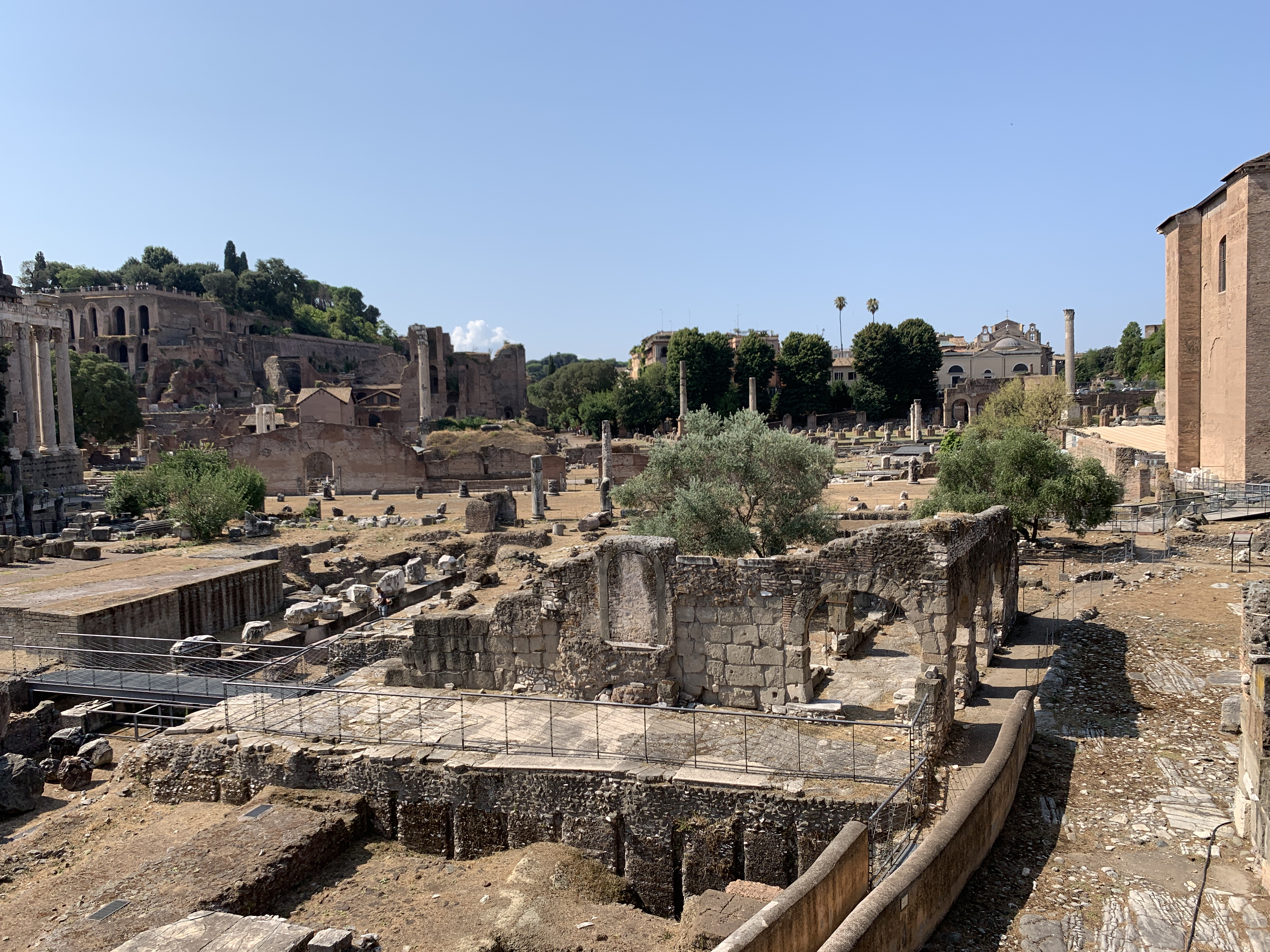

- Shown within Augustan Rome
- Interactive map of Forum of Nerva
- 41°53′35″N 12°29′10″E
- Type: Imperial fora
- Location: Regio VIII Forum Romanum

History
- Built: 85–97 AD
- Built by: Emperor Domitian

Forum of Nerva (Italian: Foro di Nerva; Latin: Forum Nervae) is an ancient structure in Rome, Italy, chronologically the next to the last of the Imperial fora built.

== Forum of Nerva (Forum Transitorium) ==
The Imperial fora within the city of Rome have, in recent decades, become again a focus of attention for archaeologists within the city. The east section of the Forum Transitorium was uncovered during large-scale excavations undertaken by the Fascist regime during the construction of the road which was originally called the Via dell’Impero, now called the Via dei Fori Imperiali. Rodolfo Lanciani was the first to gather historical sources regarding the Forum Transitorium in 1883. Initial excavations in 1913, 1926–28 and 1932-1941 helped to measure extant columns as well as uncovered the foundations of the Temple of Minerva and the perimeter wall. This temple also gave the forum another name which is used by Martial, the Forum Palladium. This derives from an epithet of the Greek Minerva, Pallas Athena. Although there was relatively little known regarding the forum outside of literary texts before the 20th century, new excavations and insights are leading historians and archaeologists to new and exciting theories about what this forum was used for and its importance as a thoroughfare through an increasingly important part of the Roman urban landscape.

== History ==
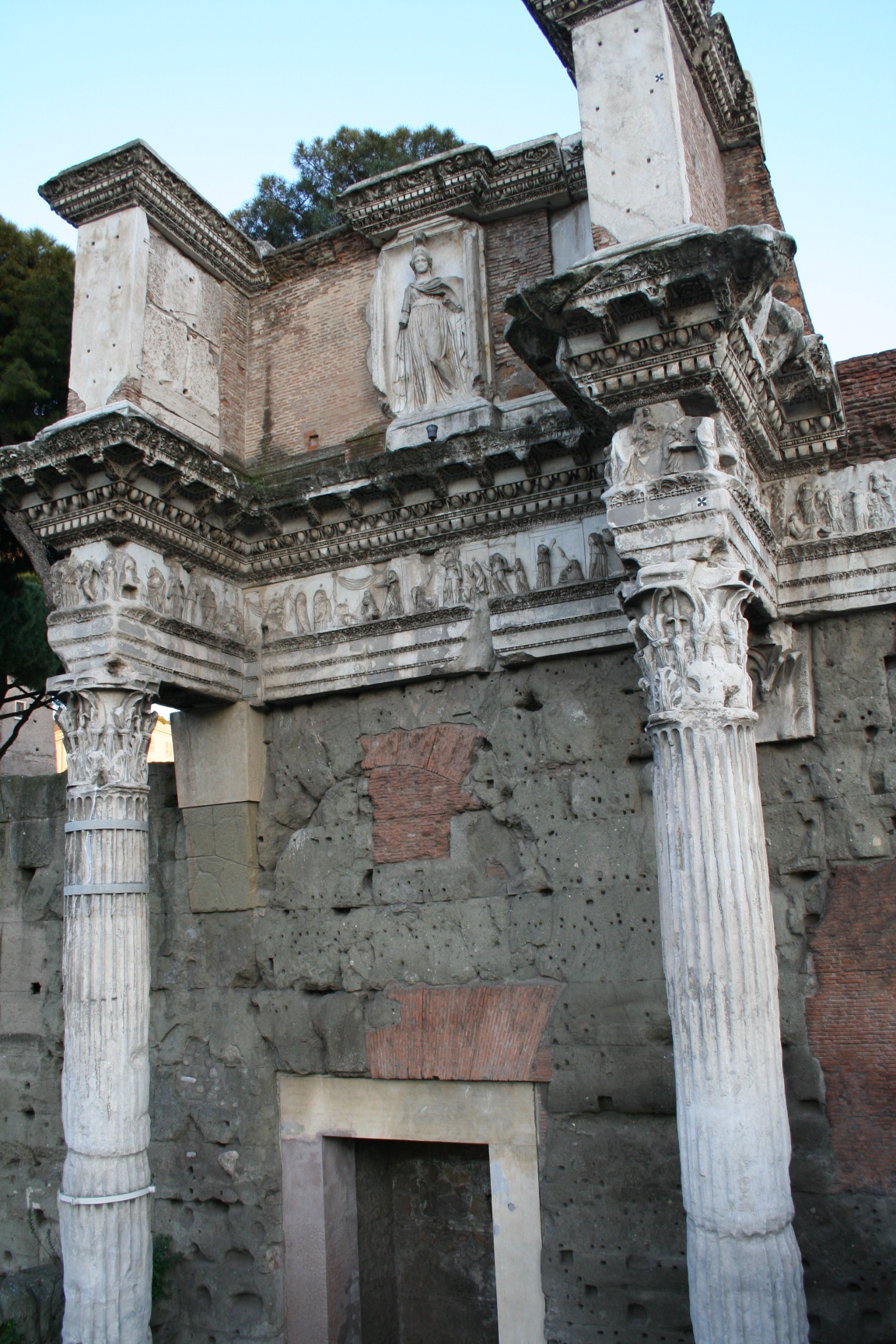
The Colonnacce, Forum of Nerva

The Forum of Nerva was the fourth and smallest of the imperial fora. Its construction was started by Emperor Domitian before the year 85 AD, but officially completed and opened by his successor, Nerva, in 97 AD, hence its official name. The street, which the forum replaced, the Argiletum, had long served as a market area, especially for booksellers and cobblers; the new forum continued to serve as both a thoroughfare and as a monumental entrance to the larger Roman Fora.

The plan of the Forum of Nerva is long and narrow, with protruding columns decorating the walls instead of arcades. A temple dedicated to Minerva dominated the western end, behind which was a monumental entrance.

Following the collapse of the Western Roman Empire, the area reverted to marshland. In the 9th century, a number of houses were built on the site, with materials salvaged from the ruins. The temple of Minerva remained relatively intact until its demolition by Pope Paul V in 1606 to provide materials for the Acqua Paola fountain in the Janiculum, and the Borghese chapel in Santa Maria Maggiore.

The eastern end of the complex was excavated from 1926 to 1940, with portions of the excavations subsequently destroyed by the creation of the Via dei Fori Imperiali. Further archaeological work was undertaken in the late 1990s.

=== Domitianic Period ===
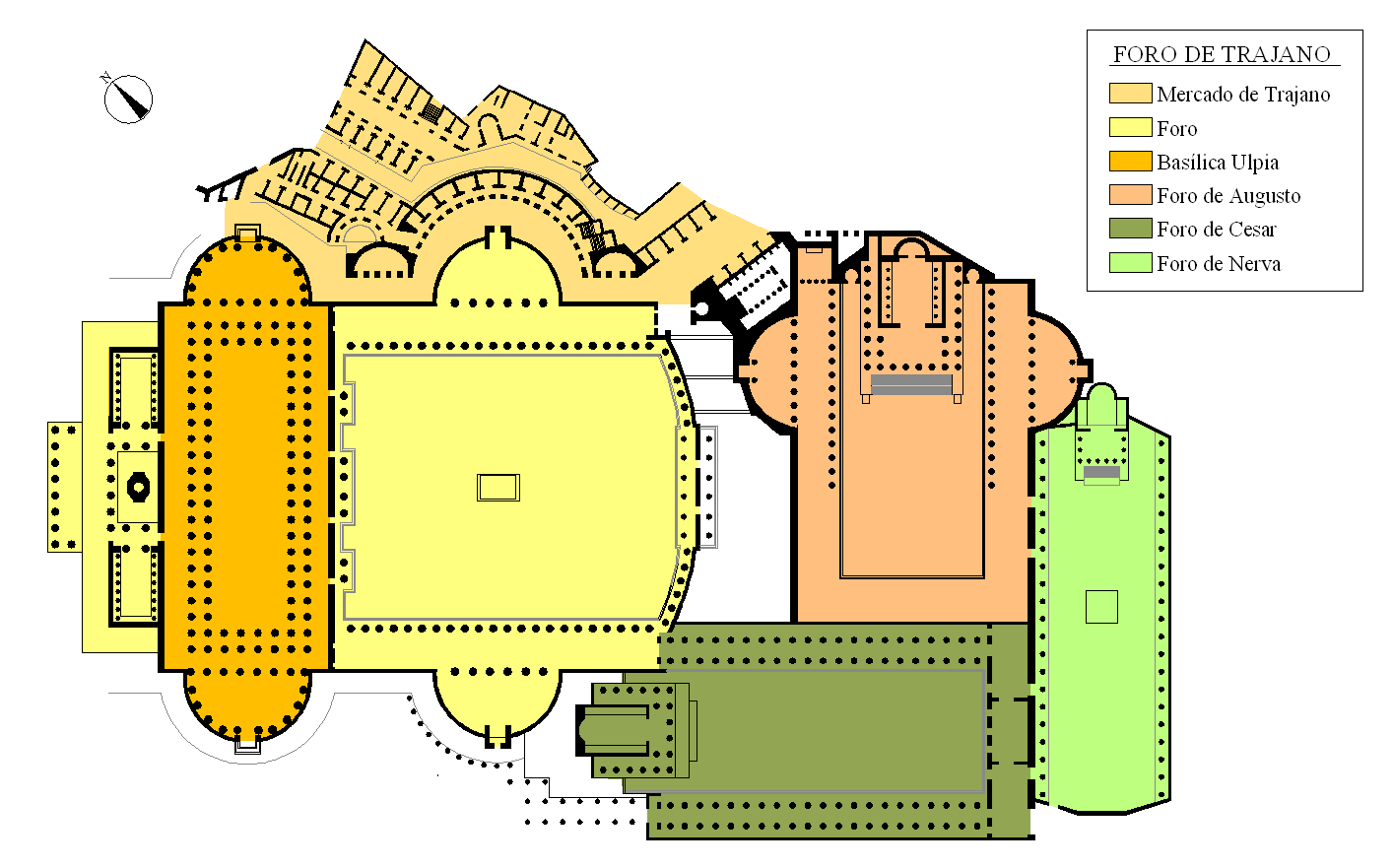
Layout of Imperial Fora.

The Forum Transitorium was originally a Domitianic reorganization and monumentalization of the Argiletum, an ancient road connecting the Forum Romanum to the Subura district. The name Forum Transitorium took hold mostly due to the enclosure including a part of this ancient route. This road ran a good distance throughout Rome, connecting the Tiber to the Esquiline. There is a good chance that the plan of its construction was created by Rabirius, the same architect who designed the Domus Augustana of Domitian. This is evidenced by the use of certain decorative details within the forum which include "spectacles" which were inserted between dentils in the "Colonnacce". The forum is long and thin (around 160 by 46 m) and conforms to the basic layout of the fora before it, with a temple dominating one end and high walls surrounding an open courtyard with a colonnade which supplied shelter and passageways. It had not yet been dedicated in AD 96 when Domitian was assassinated, however, it was likely close to being completed. It was dedicated by Nerva the year after the death of his predecessor in AD 97 and renamed Forum Nervae. In fact, the forum Transitorium was the only large-scale construction initiated by Domitian which was finished during the short fifteen-month reign of Nerva.

== Structure ==
The layout of the Forum of Nerva was dictated by the existing space between pre-existing structures. The available space was long and narrow (131 x 45 meters), and had outer walls made from blocks of lava stone peperino, covered with marble slabs, and decorated with projecting paired columns. The frieze in the entablature depicted the myth of Arachne and other reliefs depicting representations of the personifications of Roman provinces.

Access to the forum was from the sides, with three openings on the Roman Forum side and a monumental entrance on the opposing side with an exedra porticata in the shape of a horseshoe. This entrance was called Porticus Absidata.

The northern and southern ends of the forum were shaped as crescents, with a temple to Minerva (the patron deity of Domitian) at the western end, embedded into the northern crescent adjacent to the Porticus Absidata. The temple was built on a high podium, and had six Corinthian columns in front and three on the side. The back of the temple was hidden from the Forum by a wall. Near the opposite end, there may have been a temple dedicated to Janus. The underground Cloaca Maxima ran the length of the forum.

== Archaeology ==
Although the archaeological evidence of the Forum Transitorium is not extensive by any means, the evidence we do have when included with the Forma Urbis Romae (the Marble Plan) and the series of renaissance drawings which used the forum as its subject allow for a fairly accurate reproduction. The archaeological evidence includes the core of the podium of the Temple of Minerva as well as some of the temple's pavement and orthostats, foundations of the Porticus Absidata, as well as the “Colonnacce”. Most of the evidence lies at the north end of the enclosure, with the remaining southern reaches lying underneath the paved surface of the Via dei Fori Imperiali.

On the south side of the enclosure wall of the forum is the only surviving evidence of the columns en ressaut, known as the Colonnacce, which surrounded the interior of the space. These columns were a substitution for the normal colonnades which adorned the previous Imperial Fora. The reason for this substitution was purely practical due to the very limited amount of space between the Forum of Augustus and the Templum Pacis (Temple of Peace). In fact, the constraint of space and the adjacent fora walls not being parallel meant that the forum's width changes depending on where it is measured (from around 41 metres (135 ft) to 49 metres (161 ft)). Placing the columns at around 1.75 metres (5 ft 9 in) from the enclosure walls served to increase the space within the forum. With fluted pavonazzetto shafts, these columns support a richly decorated entablature with a figured frieze. Of the several preserved scenes, the best known depicts the myth of Arachne. The attic also had figures, but only a central panel with a representation of Minerva has survived in situ. The columns allowed the frieze to be broken away from the entablature and out over top of the columns and back again, an arrangement that likely ran down both long sides of the forum. This may have been responding to an original monumental colonnade placed along the Argiletum by Vespasian.

Ancient evidence also suggests that Domitian may have wanted to perpetuate the memory of the Argiletum by placing the shrine of Janus Quadrifons into the Forum Transitorium. There is no archaeological evidence for the shrine's existence. However, Martial and Statius indicate that Janus was incorporated into the plan of the new forum, the god having heralded the "Golden Age" of Domitian.

== Temple of Minerva ==
Minerva was the patron deity of Domitian, who initiated the construction of the Forum Transitorium. The rise of Minerva during this period has been attributed to the origin of her cult being in the Sabine region, which was considered the ancestral home of the Flavians. According to the research completed by H. Bauer, the travertine and peperino foundations represent two different stages of construction. The earlier temple was narrower, although it went further into the open space of the forum than did the later shrine. The earlier temple displayed equality within its intercolumnations, while the later temple varied the distances between columns depending on where they were. While the porch of the Minerva temple projected into the open space of the forum, the cella was narrowed on the northwest end in order to accommodate one of the hemicycles which protruded outwards from the Forum of Augustus.

The temple was a frontal Italic temple with marble facing which was set on a high podium which stood over the large forecourt which made up the open space of the Forum Transitorium. As with some other temples of the time, the cella ended in an apse which contained the cult statue. This apse is detailed in the Forma Urbis Romae. The façade was hexastyle (six columns on the front) with the pronaos (front room) containing two or three columns and antae on each end (architecturally representing wooden supports, holding up the roof of ancient wood-built temples). These columns were Corinthian in order and made from Phrygian marble. However, due to its extremely poor state of preservation, the front of the temple cannot be accurately measured.

== Le Colonnacce ==
Le Colonnacce is the only surviving portion of the columns en ressaut which ran down the lengths of the Forum Transitorium and stands along the flank of the Temple of Minerva. The wall is built with blocks of peperino which would have originally been faced with marble. The Corinthian columns stand only 1.75 m from the wall. The columns support an entablature that was richly decorated with a figured frieze, 21 m of which are in situ out of an original 160 m on each long flank, depicting scenes from myth, the best known being that of Arachne.

Above the cornice originally ran a continuous attic which displayed figures carved in high relief, of which one survives depicting Minerva. According to Anderson (1984), this type of architectural decoration appears to be a Domitianic innovation which had been adapted from triumphal arches, seen when compared to the Arch of Augustus at Susa along with the Arch of Trajan at Benevento. However, the use of columns in this way was Hellenistic in origin and seemingly arrived in Italy in a courtyard Façade at Praeneste and at the Porta Marzia at Perugia.

=== Arachne ===
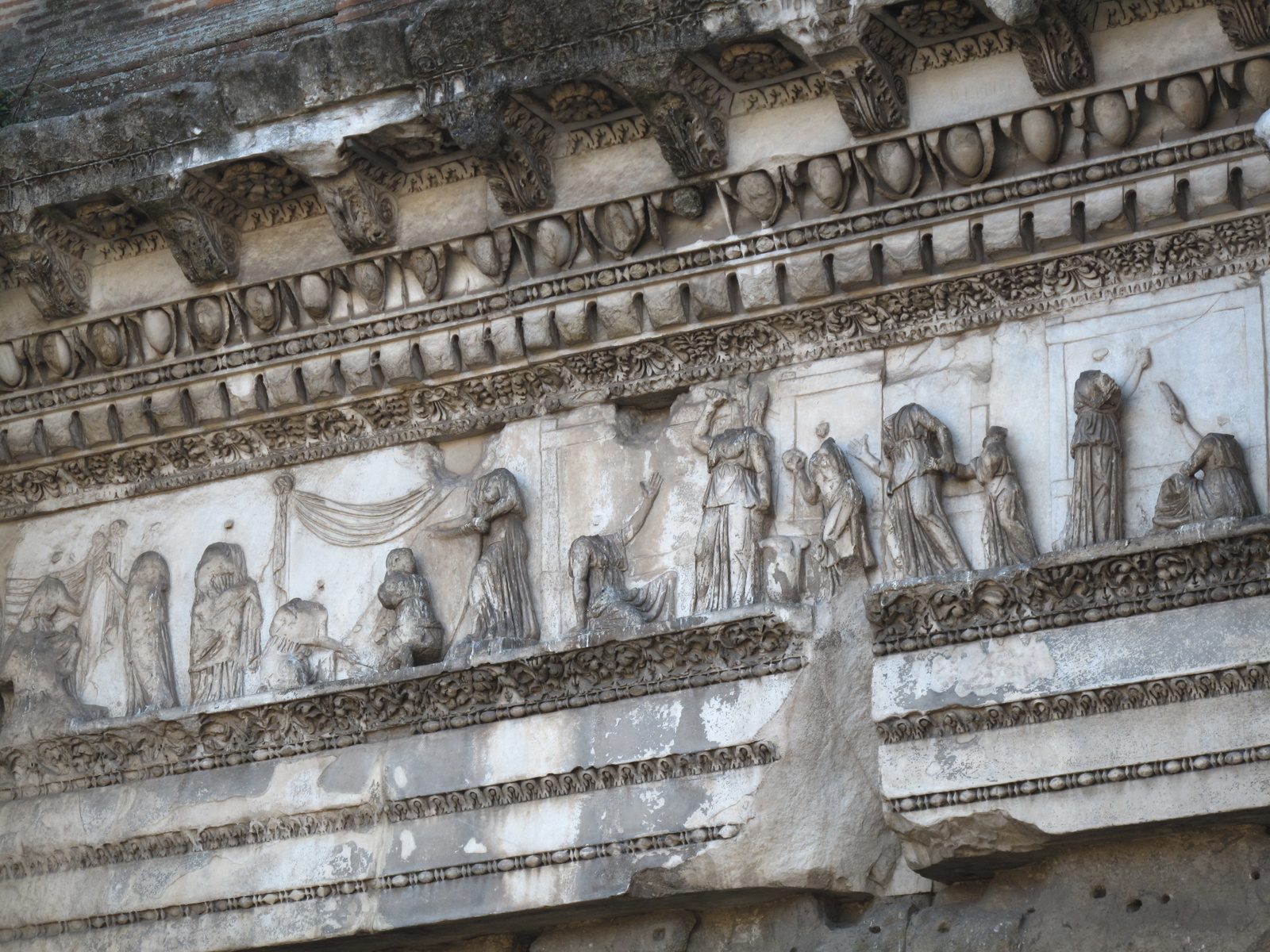
Arachne myth from the Colonnacce. In the middle Arachne can be seen cowering as Minerva smites her.

The Arachne myth describes a young woman who had great skill on the loom, so great in fact that she thought she could challenge Minerva. The goddess, disguising herself as an old woman, warns Arachne not to enter the contest but she is ignored. When the contest is complete, Minerva is enraged at Arachne's cloth's excellent quality and design of sexual acts of the gods, so she destroys it. After stopping Arachne from committing suicide, she doles out a suitable punishment, turning the young girl into a spider, doomed to spin webs in dark places. This is the only depiction of this myth in the state-sponsored art of ancient Rome. The rest of the frieze depicts women weaving and spinning under the tutelage of Minerva, the opposite to the defiant Arachne. Blanckenhagen offers one of the more detailed analyses of the frieze, viewing it as "depicting the local craftsmen's celebration of Minerva's festival, the Quinquatrus".

== Later history ==
What is known of the later history of the Forum Transitorium is only fragmentary. The first changes made to the forum appear to have been made by Alexander Severus (reigned 222-235 AD) who set up a gallery of statues of deified emperors. Contracts for the removal of stone for construction throughout the city of Rome appear in 1425, 1504, 1522, and 1527, with an attempt to preserve a small section of the forum rejected within the Roman courts in 1520. A church, perhaps that of S. Maria in Macello, appearing within a contract of 1517, tells us of its location within the forum and statuary which was removed from the space between 1550 and 1555 on the orders of Pope Julius III. The temple of Minerva was dismantled beginning in 1592. The architrave block was then re-cut and reused as the new main altar within St. Peter's.

== See also ==
- Roman Forum – Ancient Roman centre of Rome, Italy
- Roman architecture
- Arachne

== Notes ==
Preceded by Forum of Caesar	Landmarks of Rome; Forum of Nerva	Succeeded by Forum of Vespasian
