= Statue of Augustus, Rome =

Sculpture in Rome, Italy

Statue of Augustus
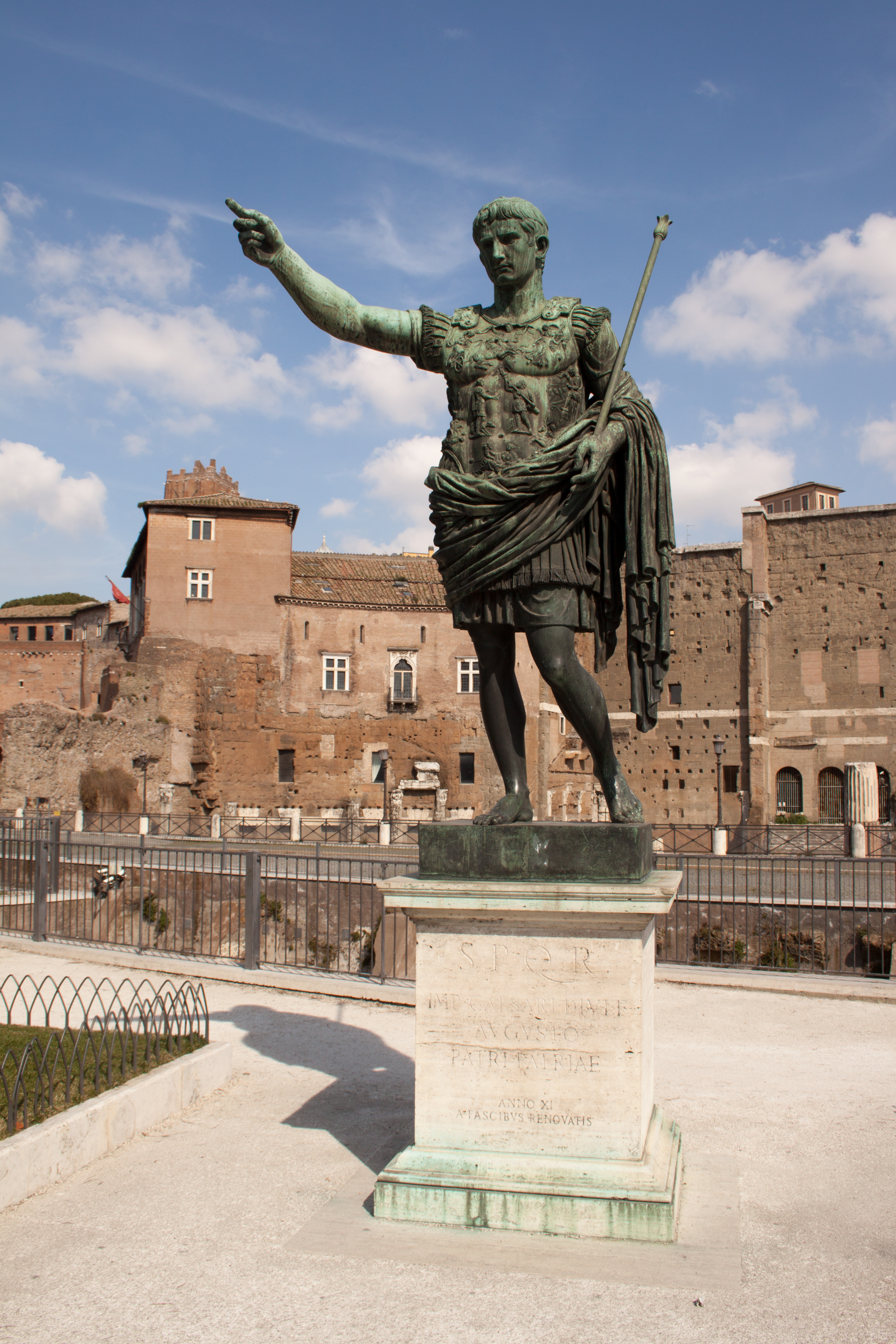
- The statue in 2013
- Subject: Augustus
- Location: Rome, Italy

A statue of Augustus is installed along Via dei Fori Imperiali in Rome, Italy.
