= Via dei Fori Imperiali =

Thoroughfare in Rome, Italy

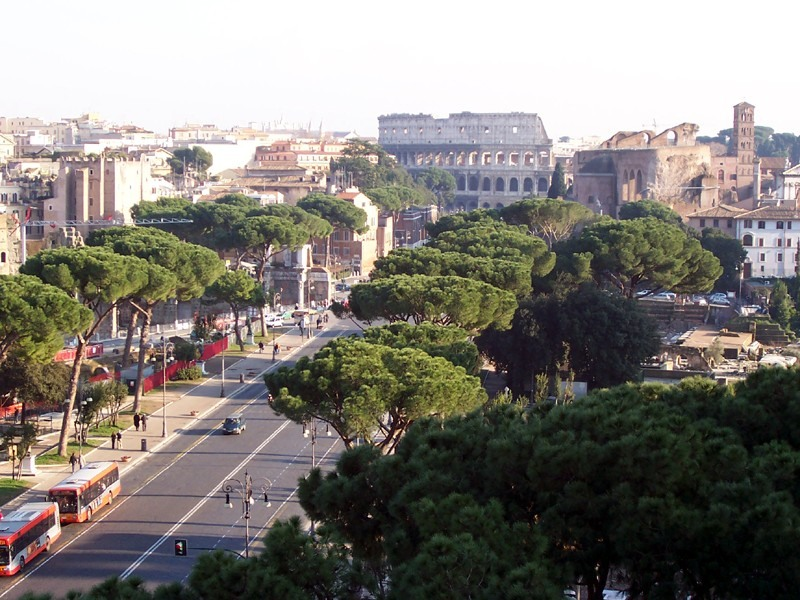
- Via dei Fori Imperiali
- Interactive map of Via dei Fori Imperiali
- Location: Rome, Italy
- Coordinates: 41°53′31″N 12°29′21″E

The Via dei Fori Imperiali (formerly Via dei Monti, then Via dell'Impero) is a road in the centre of the city of Rome, Italy, that is in a straight line from the Piazza Venezia to the Colosseum. The road was built in 1932 to rediscover and make visible the Imperial fora: Forum of Trajan, Forum of Augustus and Forum of Nerva, as well as Trajan's Market, previously hidden under the buildings. Most of these monuments can be seen on both sides of the road. The street is lined with stone pines (Pinus pinea). Since the 1990s, there has been a new deal of archaeological excavation along the road and in its gardens.

== History ==
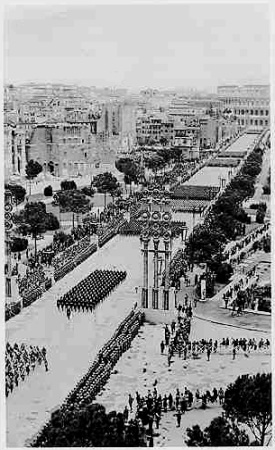
Fascist military parade on the Via dell'Impero.

In the Roman regulatory plans of 1873, 1883 and 1909 it was planned to open a road between Piazza Venezia and the Colosseum, therefore on the route of the present Via dei Fori Imperiali. The project was consistent with the philosophy of urban planning of the time, which provided for the opening in the city centres of wide connecting roads created by gutting the ancient building fabric. A classic example is the transformation of Paris during the Second French Empire, by Napoleon III and the prefect Baron Haussmann, but there were similar interventions in London (1848–1865), Florence (1859–1865), Vienna (1857) and Brussels (1867–1871).

The Via dei Fori Imperiali was finally built during the Fascist period between 1924 and 1932. The tentative name of the road during its construction was Via dei Monti, but it was named Via dell'Impero when it was inaugurated. Mussolini, on horseback, cut the ribbon opening the road on 9 April 1932 and led a military parade with veterans of World War I. After the end of World War II, the road was renamed to its present name. Each year on 2 June it hosts a parade in celebration of the founding of the modern Italian Republic.

== Road construction ==
The road was built to rediscover and make visible the Imperial fora: Forum of Trajan, Forum of Augustus, Forum of Caesar, Forum of Nerva and Trajan's Market, previously hidden under the buildings.

This decision necessitated demolishing buildings whose historical interest was deemed negligible compared to the ancient monuments that would be unearthed. This led to the demolition of more than 40,000 sq yd (8.3 acres; 3.3 ha) of one of the most densely populated areas of Rome, obliterating medieval and Renaissance structures, including three little churches and tenements that housed 746 of Rome's poorest families, which were relocated to peripheral neighborhoods. The artworks contained in the demolished buildings, including the frescoes, were saved by removing them.

Demolitions carried out:

- excavation and removal of a large part of the Velia, the hill halfway between the Colosseum and Piazza Venezia;
- destruction of the neighbourhood of Via Alessandrina;
- excavation and covering of the gardens of the 16th century Villa Rivaldi and its nymphaeums;
- demolition of the churches of San Lorenzo ai Monti, Sant'Urbano a Campo Carleo and Santa Maria degli Angeli in Macello Martyrum.

The Via dei Fori Imperiali completely changed the landscape and character of a part of Rome: before its construction, the Colosseum was not visible from Piazza Venezia and the imperial fora were hidden by a popular quarter of the fifteenth century.

In 1927,the street's designer, Antonio Muñoz, announced a competition to document the aspects of the areas that were destined to be demolished in those years of intense urban renewal of the capital; among these areas, naturally, was the quartiere Alessandrino. He wanted there to be evidence not only of the buildings, but also of daily life, through watercolours, oils, tempera, drawings, engravings and photographs. The works are preserved at the Museo di Roma (Museum of Rome)

Archaeological areas and monuments made visible with the construction of Via dei Fori Imperiali

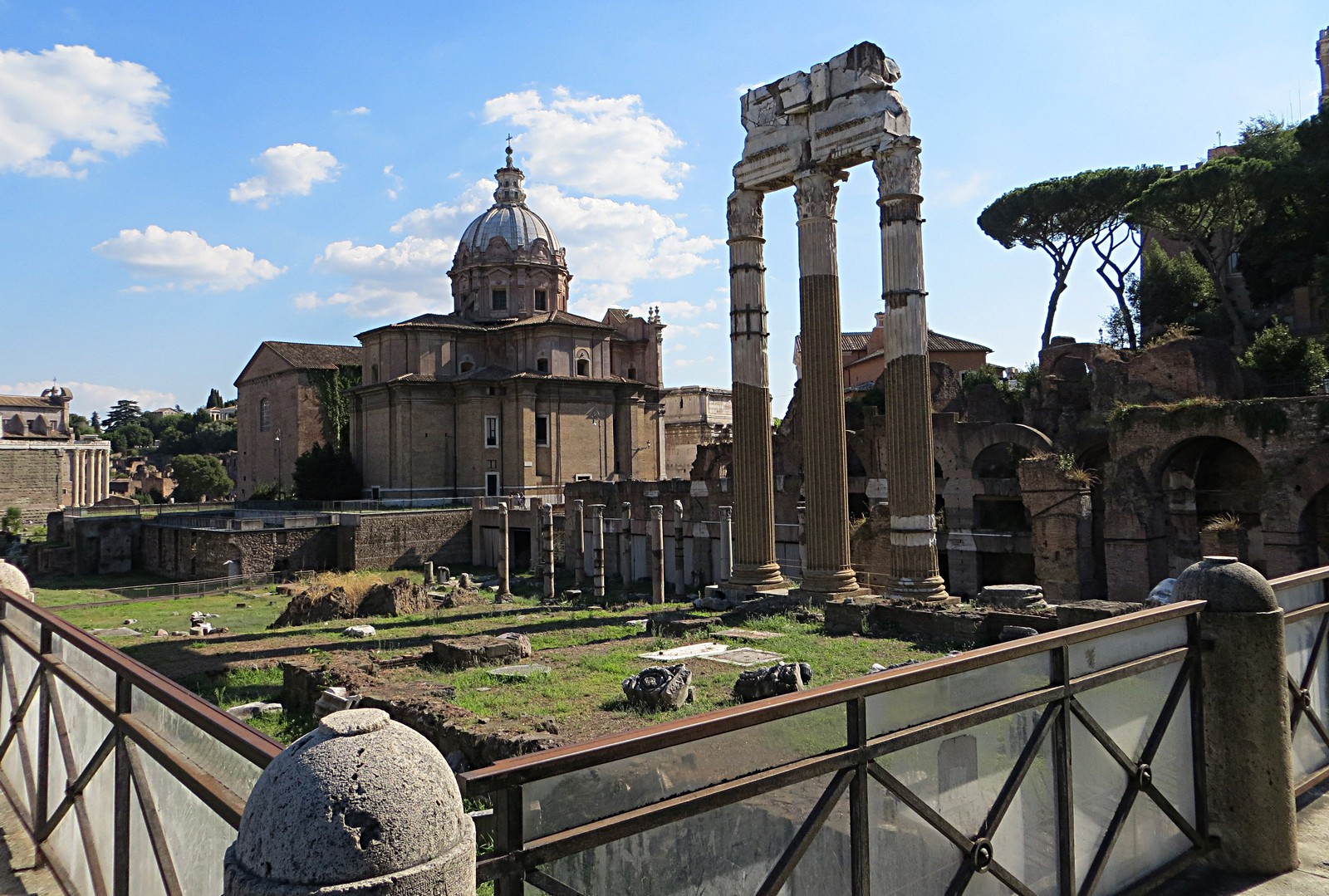
Forum of Caesar

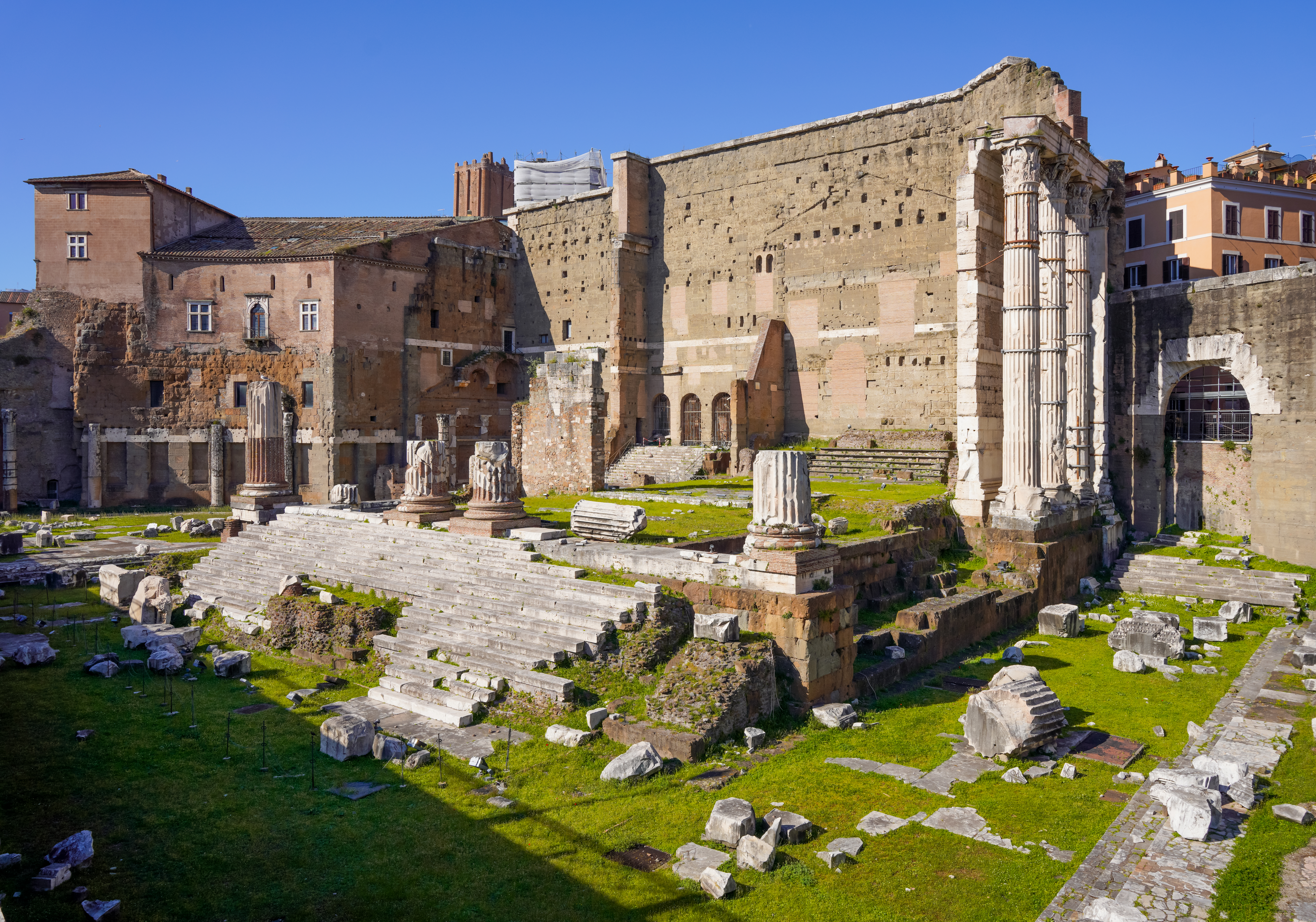
Forum of Augustus

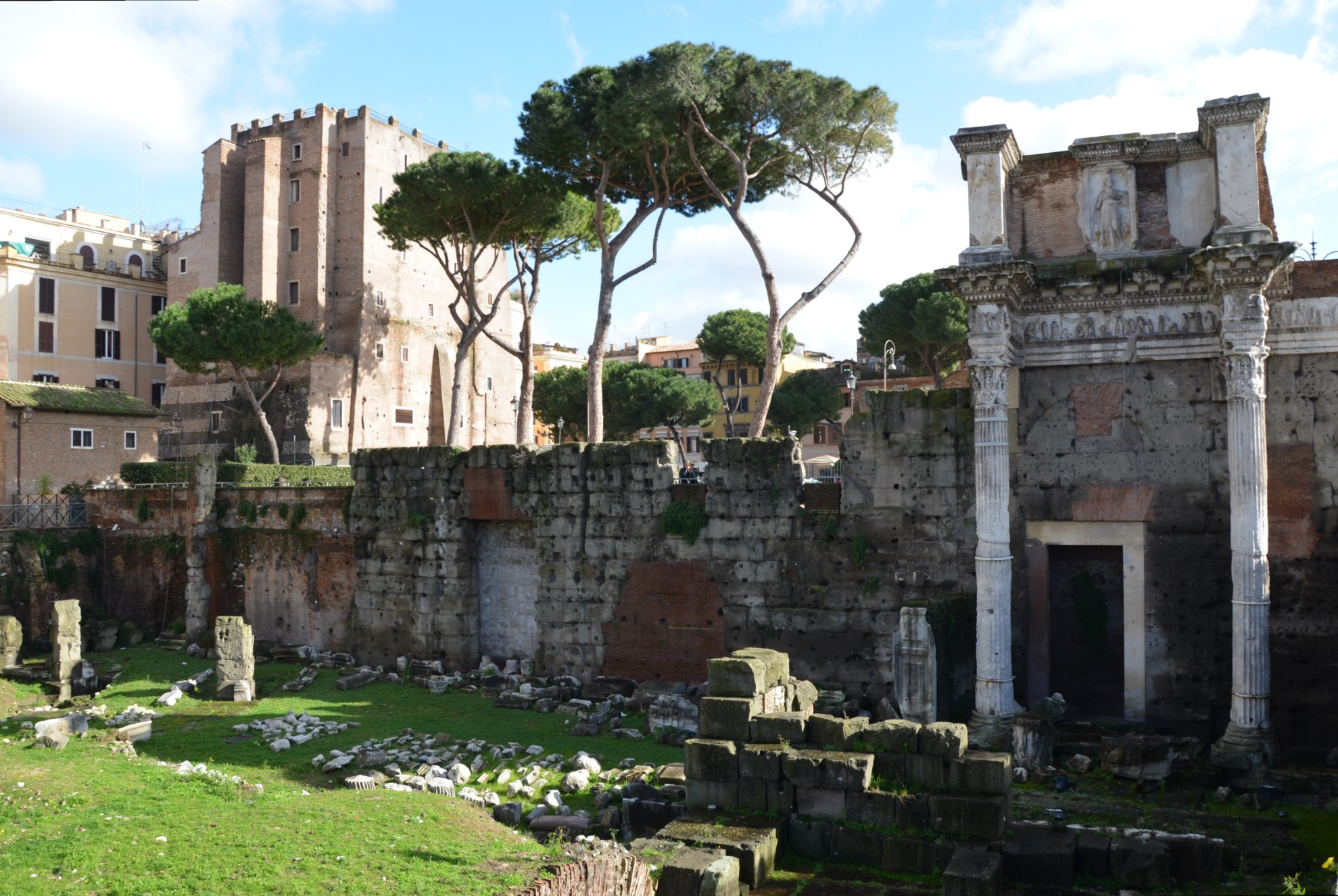
Forum of Nerva

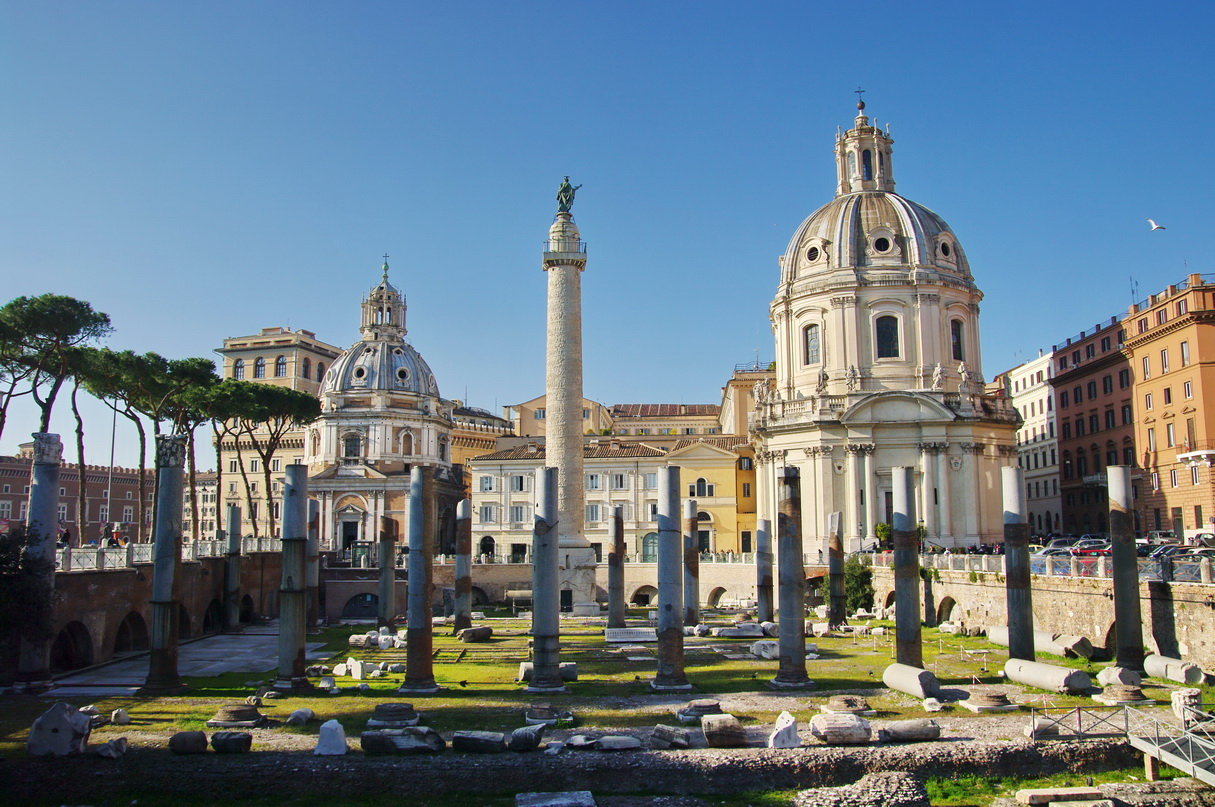
Forum of Trajan

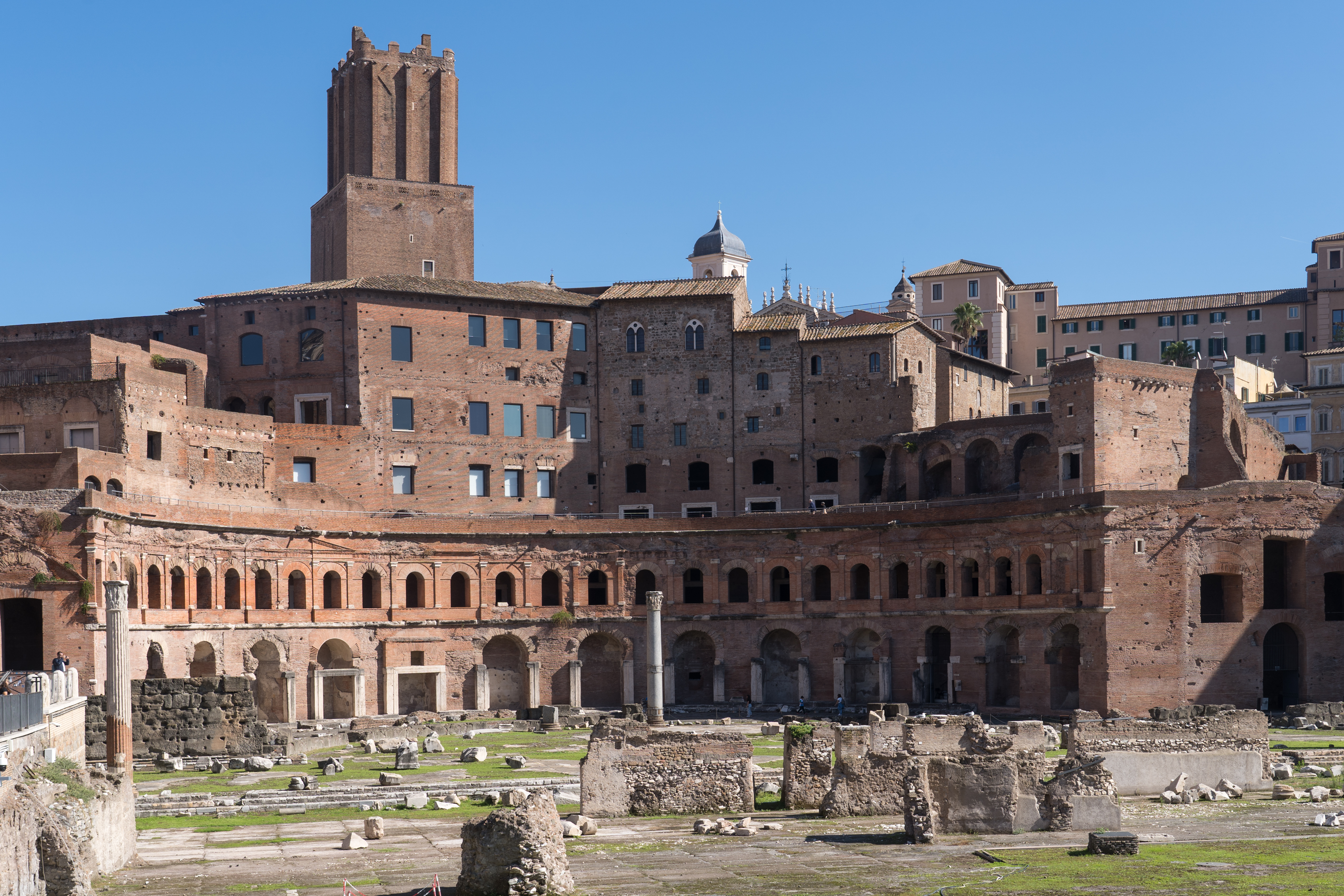
Trajan's Market

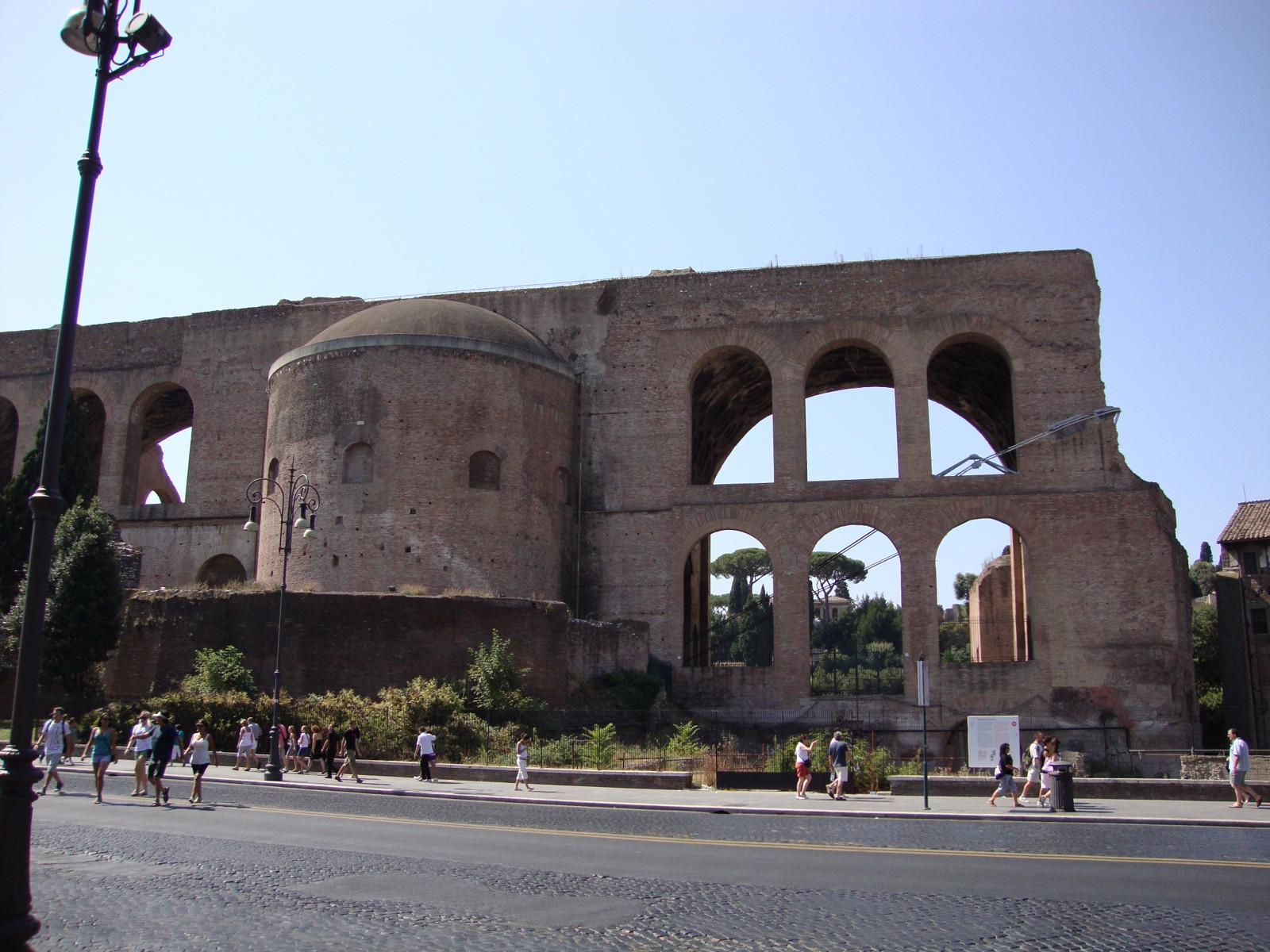
Back side of Basilica of Maxentius

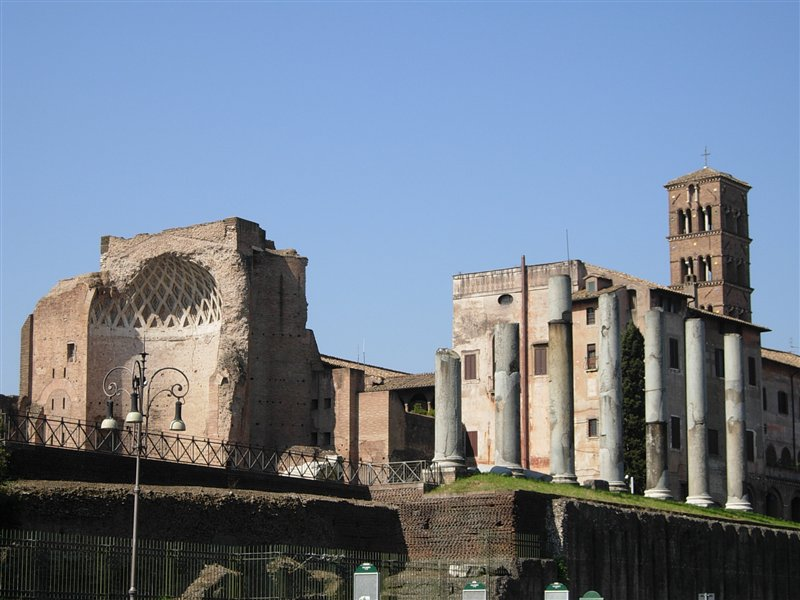
Temple of Venus and Roma

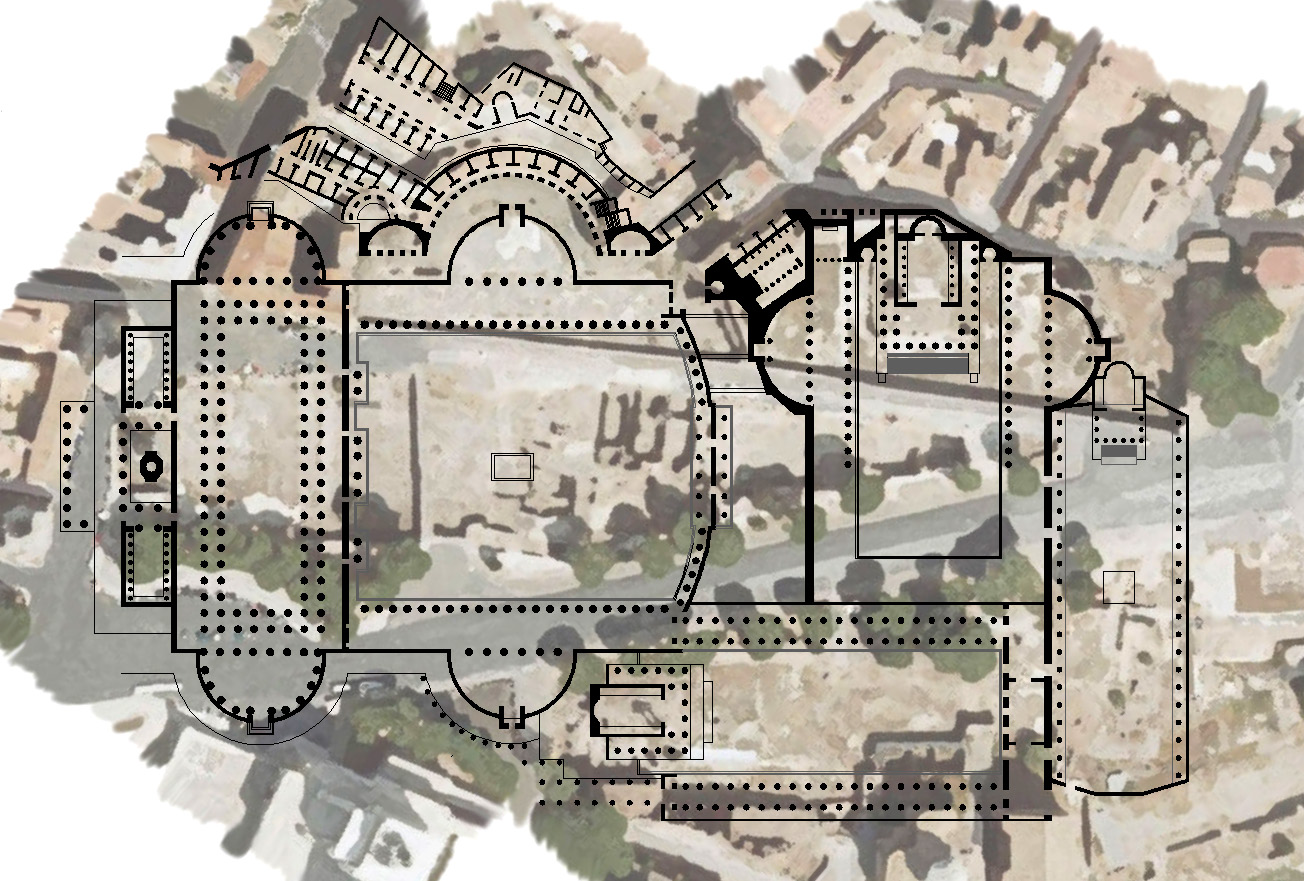
The map of the Imperial Forums superimposed on the street of the same name.

== The Future of Via dei Fori Imperiali ==
Since the 1970s, there was a debate about the future of the road, for some it should have been dismantled to allow the archaeological areas that extend along its sides to be joined together. For others it was one of the most spectacular roads in Rome and should have been preserved. Art historian Cesare Brandi spoke out against the road's dismantling because he believed the Imperial Forums could be better admired among the pines and laurels, looking out from the road, due to its elevated position above the archaeological area.

Since the 1990s, there has been a new deal of archaeological excavation along the road and in its gardens. This has sparked heated controversy, due to the elimination of part of the gardens and the exposure of the ruins of very recent buildings, considered "historical testimonies" on a par with the ruins of the Imperial era.

The debate ended in 2023, when the Rome Capital Authority and the Capitoline Superintendency for Cultural Heritage announced an international design competition for the redevelopment of Via dei Fori Imperiali. The following year, the commission selected the winning design, the work of a Roman architecture and urban planning firm. The project envisions maintaining the street and increasing its services, including pedestrian spaces, green areas, balconies, elevated walkways, and cycle/pedestrian paths.

== Road traffic ==
The four-lane, heavily trafficked road carried an extremely heavy load of motor vehicle traffic straight through the Roman Forum area, whose exhaust fumes and vibrations damaged the ancient Roman monuments. After numerous failed efforts by academics and citizens' groups to pressure the Roman city government to close the road to traffic, the Mayor of Rome Ignazio Marino on 3 August 2013 closed the southern part of the road (between Largo Corrado Ricci and the Colosseum) to private motor vehicles, while buses and taxis are still allowed to use it.

Currently, Via dei Fori Imperiali is completely pedestrianized on the Saturday and Sunday of every last weekend of the month.

== See also ==
- Statue of Augustus, Rome
- Statue of Julius Caesar
- Statue of Nerva
- Statue of Trajan, Rome

== Sources ==
- Rendina, Claudio (1999). Enciclopedia di Roma (in Italian). Newton Compton.

Preceded by Via della Conciliazione	Landmarks of Rome; Via dei Fori Imperiali	Succeeded by Via Sacra
