= History of the Vittoriano =

History of the Vittoriano, an Italian national monument

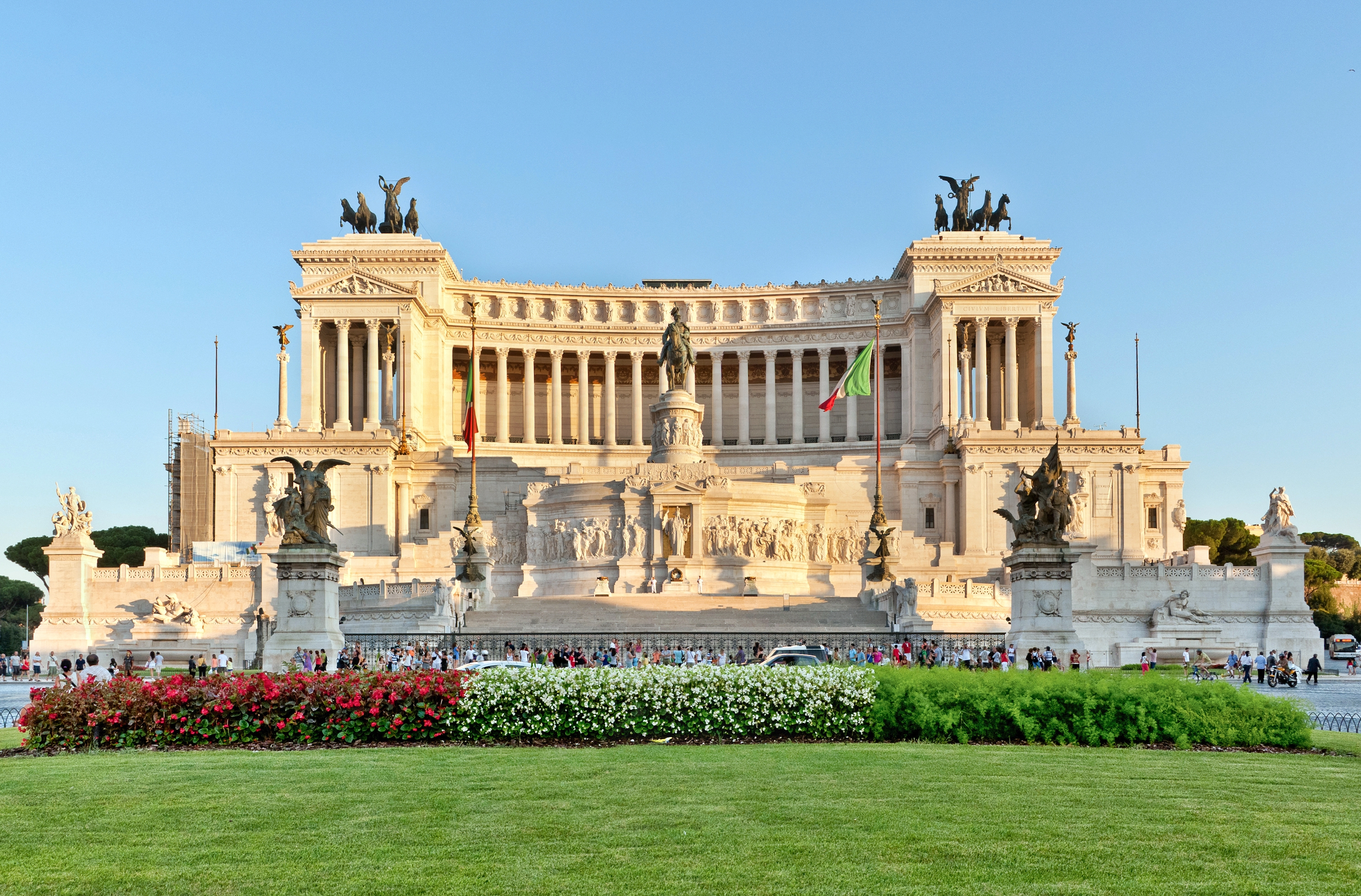
The Vittoriano as seen from Piazza Venezia. In the foreground is the hedge with the shape and colors of the flag of Italy that is located in the center of the square

The history of the Vittoriano, an Italian national monument complex located in Rome's Piazza Venezia on the northern slope of the Capitoline Hill, began in 1878 when it was decided to erect in the capital a permanent monument named after Victor Emmanuel II of Savoy, the first king of Italy in the modern era, who brought the process of Italian unification to fruition, so much so that he is referred to by historiography as the “Father of the Fatherland.”

In 1880, a first international competition was announced for the construction of the monument, won by Frenchman Henri-Paul Nénot, but this was not followed by an implementation phase of the project. This first attempt was followed in 1882 by a second competition, won by Giuseppe Sacconi, who later became the architect who designed the Vittoriano. The foundation stone of the monument was solemnly laid by King Umberto I of Savoy in 1885. To erect it it was necessary to proceed, between 1885 and 1888, with numerous expropriations and demolitions of pre-existing buildings in the area adjacent to the Capitol, carried out thanks to a precise program established by the government led by Agostino Depretis.

The monumental complex was inaugurated by King Victor Emmanuel III of Savoy on June 4, 1911, on the occasion of the events connected with the National Exhibition, during the celebrations of the 50th anniversary of the Unification of Italy. In 1921 part of the monument, the Altar of the Fatherland, originally an altar of the goddess Roma, was chosen to house the remains of the Unknown Soldier, whose body was buried on November 4 in a ceremony attended by a huge crowd. The last completion works took place in 1935, with the construction of the Central Museum of the Risorgimento, which was inaugurated and opened to the public decades later, in 1970.

With the advent of fascism (1922) the Vittoriano became one of the stages of the regime led by Benito Mussolini. With the fall of Fascism (July 25, 1943) and the end of World War II (September 2, 1945), from which resulted the referendum of June 2, 1946, after which the Italian Republic was proclaimed, the Vittoriano, emptied of the military content that was associated with it by Fascism, returned to its previous function, becoming again - through the evocation of the figure of Victor Emmanuel II of Savoy and the realization of the Altar of the Fatherland - a secular temple metaphorically dedicated to free and united Italy and celebrating - by virtue of the burial of the Unknown Soldier - the sacrifice for the fatherland and for the ideals connected to it. In the 1960s a slow disinterest of Italians in the Vittoriano began: the latter was in fact no longer seen as one of the symbols of national identity, but as a cumbersome monument representing an Italy outdated by history.

It was the President of the Italian Republic Carlo Azeglio Ciampi, at the beginning of the 21st century, who began a work of valorization and revitalization of Italy's patriotic symbols, including the Vittoriano. Thanks to Ciampi, the Vittoriano once again became the most important place where the most symbolically rich national events are organized. Ciampi's initiative was continued by his successors.

== Background ==
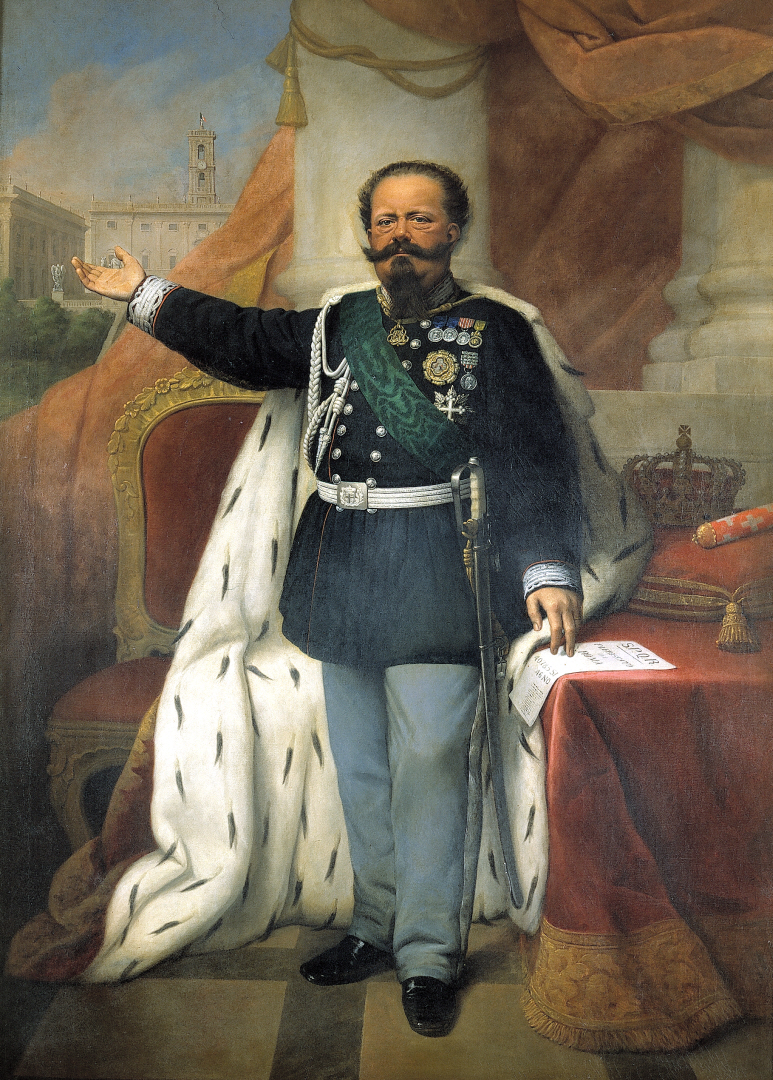
Victor Emmanuel II of Savoy, first king of united Italy, to whom the Vittoriano is dedicated

After the death of Victor Emmanuel II of Savoy on January 9, 1878, there were many initiatives intended to erect a permanent monument celebrating the first king of united Italy, that is, to the one who brought to fruition the process of Italian unification and liberation from foreign domination, so much so that he is referred to by historiography as the “Father of the Fatherland,” partly due to the political work of the Prime Minister of the Kingdom of Sardinia Camillo Benso, Count of Cavour and the military contribution of Giuseppe Garibaldi. The goal was thus to commemorate the entire Risorgimento period through one of its protagonists.

The first official act intended for the construction of a monument dedicated to Victor Emmanuel II of Savoy was a resolution of the Rome city council dated January 10, 1878. In this act it was decided to allocate one hundred thousand liras and to set up a national fund-raising campaign whose objective would be to raise funds destined to erect a permanent monument dedicated to Victor Emmanuel II of Savoy to be built in Rome.

This initiative was followed, on March 26, 1878, by a bill filed in the Chamber of Deputies of the Kingdom of Italy by MP Francesco Perroni Paladini with the same objective. On April 4, the government took up this indication represented by Giuseppe Zanardelli, Minister of the Interior of the Kingdom of Italy, who filed a similar bill in the Council of Ministers.

Zanardelli's bill was approved by the Parliament of the Kingdom of Italy on May 16, 1878 with 211 votes in favor and 10 votes against. An excerpt from this legislative act, which was the first formal step addressed to the erection of the monument, reads:

[...] A national monument shall be erected in Rome to the memory of King Victor Emmanuel, liberator of the Fatherland, founder of its Unity [...]

— Law No. 115 of May 16, 1878

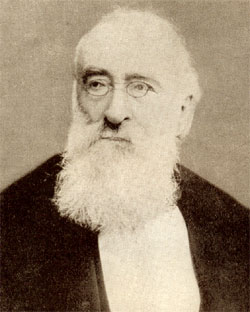
Agostino Depretis, several times president of the Council of Ministers of the Kingdom of Italy

The bill did not specify the type of monument, nor did it specify the place in Rome where it would be erected, since it delegated the decision on these matters to a special commission that would be chaired by the president of the Council of Ministers and made up of nine senators, nine deputies, the mayor of Rome as well as the minister of public education and the minister of public works.

The work of this commission led the president of the Council of Ministers to present the executive project of the monument to the Chamber of Deputies on June 14, 1879. The latter specified the details of the initiative: an international public competition would be announced; the public funds earmarked for the work would amount to eight million liras (to which would then be added the money raised by a public fundraising campaign open to all Italians, including those who had moved abroad during the Italian migration of the late 19th and early 20th centuries); the monument would be erected in the square of the Baths of Diocletian; the type of construction would be a triumphal arch; the allegorical meanings it was to convey would be “independence,” “unity,” and “freedom”; it was to depict, through architectural and artistic works, the history of the Risorgimento.

All of the commission's important decisions were contested: those concerning the method decided for the call for entries (the international significance of the competition, which would have given the possibility of victory to foreign artists: this was, according to some, incompatible with the national character of the monument being erected), the type of monument chosen and the place where it would be erected. The fall of Agostino Depretis' government on July 14, 1879, caused the temporary postponement of the project; it was resumed in March 1880 after the general elections in May of that year.

A new commission was set up, which decided to remove all constraints from the notice, which would still be international: the latter, in fact, no longer specified either the place where the monument would be erected (the possible choices were: Piazza di Termini (the modern “Piazza dei Cinquecento”), Piazza Vittorio Emanuele II, the Pincian Hill, the Prati district or the Capitoline Hill) nor the type of construction to be built (the possibilities were: statues, triumphal arches, pantheons, simple arches and/or monumental squares). This proposal was later approved by parliament.

== The first competition ==
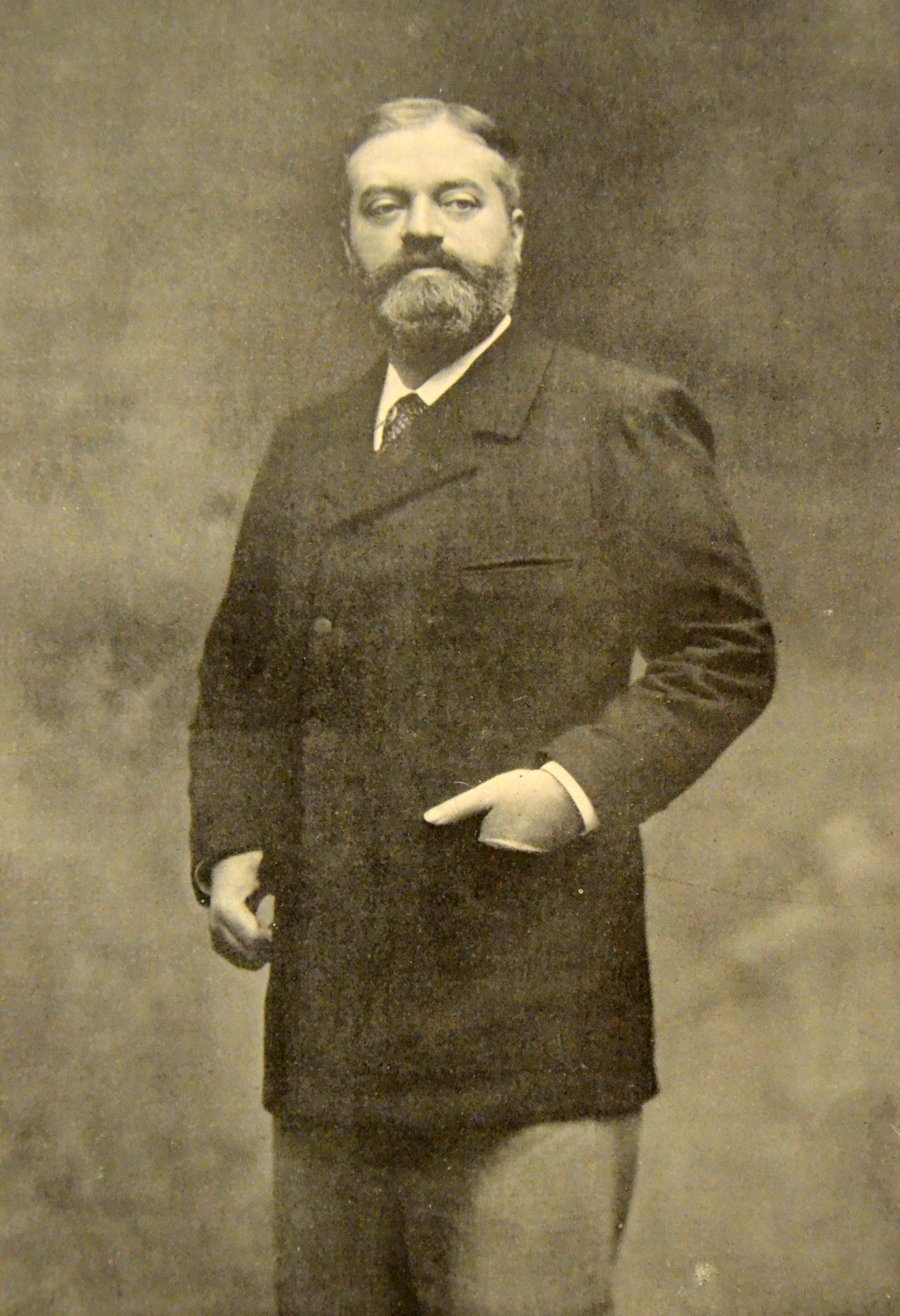
Henri-Paul Nénot, winner of the first competition, which was later cancelled

On September 13, 1880, the “Royal Commission for the Monument to Victor Emmanuel II” was established, which announced on September 23 of the same month an international competition in which three hundred and eleven competitors then participated. All the designs were exhibited to the public on December 15, 1881 at the Santa Susanna Agricultural Museum.

The competition was won by Frenchman Henri-Paul Nénot, but this was not followed by an implementation phase of the project. Nénot's idea was to build a triumphal arch with three fornixes along Via Nazionale at the entrance to Piazza di Termini (Nénot chose this location because it was one of the busiest “entrances” to Rome, given the proximity of the Termini train station): a flight of steps surrounded by eight statues was to be erected there, in the center of which was a statue of Victor Emmanuel II of Savoy, portrayed standing and with his arm raised. Four fountains were also to be placed in the square.

It was decided not to go ahead with the project for various reasons. The heated controversy over the fact that the winner was, for a monument representing a prominent figure in Italian history, a foreigner; the fact that Nénot's idea was, as discovered only later, a slightly updated version of an earlier design for a French university that he carried out in 1877. Added to this was the tension due to the so-called “slap of Tunis,” or the occupation of Tunisia by France, Nénot's nation of origin.

Another reason for the failure to implement Nénot's project was the excessive freedom given to the artists in choosing the place of construction and the type of monument to be built, guidelines that had led to a flourishing of architectural proposals that were too different from each other (in total there were 293 projects filed). They ranged from very simple monuments formed by monumental columns and equestrian statues, to complex and large buildings.

The runners-up were Ettore Ferrari and Pio Piacentini, who produced a collaboratively drafted proposal that was much liked, which envisaged the construction of a monument on the northern slope of the Capitoline hill, namely that on which the basilica of Santa Maria in Aracoeli stands. Ferrari-Piacentini's project envisaged a monument to be built alongside the aforementioned basilica in the form of an imposing marble construction marked by ascending tiers of steps, with a majestic colonnade on its summit and with a statue of Victor Emmanuel II of Savoy seated on a throne, which would be the centerpiece of the architectural complex. This design was the one later realized with the construction of the Vittoriano, which has precisely such features, with the appropriate variations (the pose of the king would later be on horseback and not on a throne).

== The second competition ==
=== The preparatory phase ===
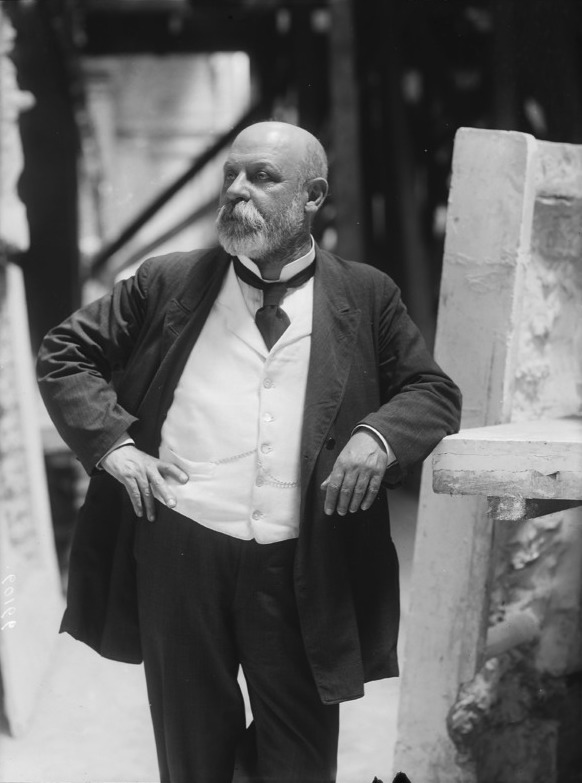
Pio Piacentini, who made, together with Ettore Ferrari, the design of the Vittoriano that inspired the announcement of the second competition

Since the excessive freedom granted by the notice had led to the failure of the first competition, it was decided to hold a second one that would establish, this time, both the place of construction and the precise characteristics of the building.

The debate prior to the holding of the second competition was dominated by the choice of the place where the monument would be erected: the Capitoline Hill, the preferred solution from the beginning of the discussion; the Piazza di Termini, which was on the border between the historic district of Rome and more recent buildings (“between the old and the new Rome,” as it is stated on the minutes of the commission); or the enlargement and modification of the Pantheon and the adjacent Piazza della Rotonda with the construction of new monumental buildings. In the debate it was also proposed, in case the Vittoriano was to be built on the Capitoline Hill, the demolition of the pre-existing Palazzo Senatorio to the ground level of the underlying Tabularium, which would serve as the foundation for the monument dedicated to Victor Emmanuel II: the latter would thus dominate the Imperial Fora.

In the project that came second in the first competition, drawn up by Ettore Ferrari and Pio Piacentini, the chosen location was the Capitoline Hill; this idea was liked by most members of the Royal Commission. The Vittoriano, a monumental symbol of the history of the Risorgimento, with this choice, would in fact have been grafted onto the history of ancient Rome, given the presence of the aforementioned Palazzo Senatorio and Tabularium, which make this hill of Rome one of the most representative of Roman antiquity, since both are in fact the symbol of the power of Rome (from them derives the other appellation by which the Capitolium is known: “Capitoline Hill,” i.e., relating to the political and administrative center represented by the “capital”) since they housed the public state archives, i.e., the most important public acts of ancient Rome, from decrees of the Roman Senate to peace treaties.

Moreover, the bulk of the Vittoriano, given that it would be built in the historic center of Rome, would rival, even from a “secular-spiritual” point of view, the monuments of Papal Rome: in fact, the aversion against Papal Rome, and all its buildings, which was represented by Pope Pius IX, a pontiff who came into decisive opposition with the newly formed Kingdom of Italy leading to the resurgence of the Roman Question, was still very much alive.

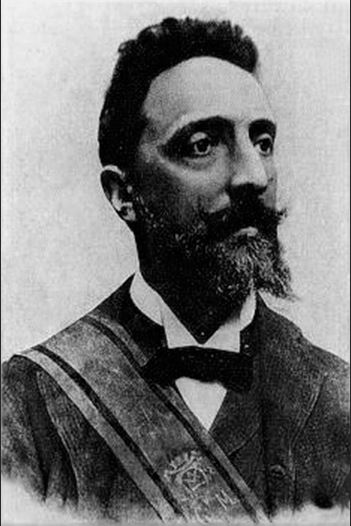
Ettore Ferrari, who made, together with Pio Piacentini, the design of the Vittoriano that inspired the announcement of the second competition

However, the commission decided to examine the problem of the site in depth by appointing, on June 8, 1882, three subcommittees that were to examine the three proposals under discussion: the Capitoline hill, the Pantheon and the Termini station square. The conclusions of the three assemblies were discussed between June 10 and 12, 1882 by the royal commission. During the debate it was pointed out, data in hand, that the solution at the Capitol Hill had an additional merit: the surface on which to build the monument. Demolishing also the Franciscan convent of the Ara Coeli, which was already municipal property following the suppression of the religious orders on October 20, 1873, would have resulted in 7 008 000 square meters on the Capitoline hill, an area vastly superior to the one available in Termini station square or near the Pantheon.

Another heated discussion that took place before the announcement of the competition was related to costs: the construction of the monument on the Capitoline Hill, the preferred location, was much more expensive, due to expropriations, than the one planned in the square of Termini station. In fact, the total cost of the work, for the monument built on the Capitoline Hill, excluding expropriations, reached nine million liras (one million coming from the public fundraising campaign to which as much as eight million of public money had to be added).

The debate continued until the vote of June 12, 1882, when it was decided, with 9 votes in favor and 6 votes against, to limit the discussion to only two places: the Capitoline Hill and the Termini station square. The work of the royal commission then resumed on September 16, 1882. On that occasion, the stalemate that had been created was resolved by Agostino Depretis, president of the Council of Ministers, who decisively proposed the solution of building the monument on the Capitoline Hill. Agostino Depretis, in this regard, declared:

[...] In the choice one could not [disregard] political considerations; and these considerations [advised] to prefer the Capitolium to any other place. [...]

— Agostino Depretis

The royal commission then unanimously approved Depretis's proposal. On September 16, 1882, the commission then announced a second competition, much more precise than the previous one and open only to Italian artists, which also specified the site of construction, the Capitoline Hill, i.e., one of Rome's hills richest in national symbolism, and the general type of building, which was to rival in grandeur the most important constructions built by the ancient Romans and popes: a monument whose style would be inspired by the design of Ettore Ferrari and Pio Piacentini, that is, an imposing marble construction distinguished by ascending tiers of steps, with a wide and majestic colonnade at its top, and with an equestrian statue of Victor Emmanuel II of Savoy in the center.

=== The holding of the competition ===
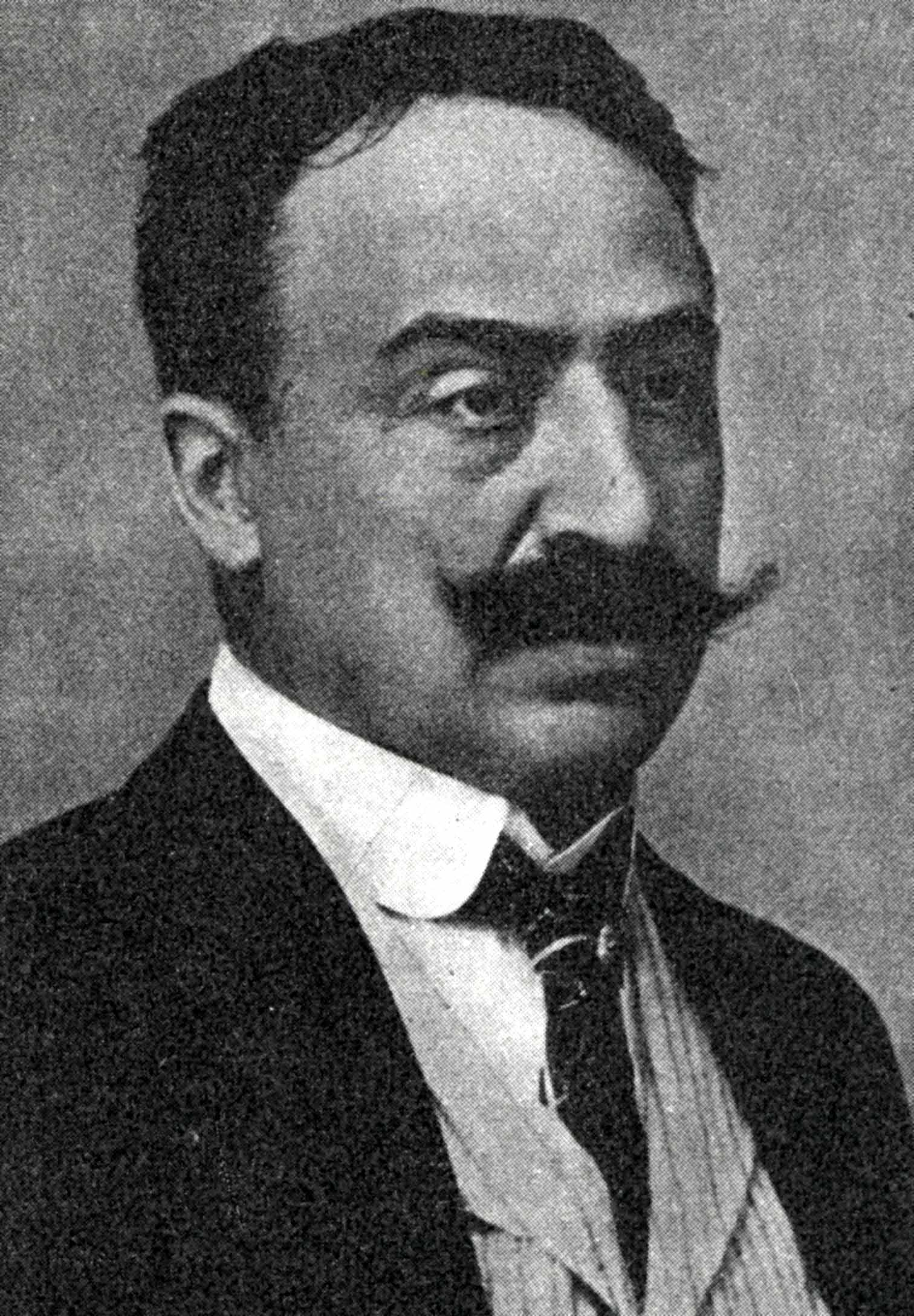
Giuseppe Sacconi, author of the Vittoriano project and director of its construction site

The details of the design, including changing the type of statue of Victor Emmanuel II from a figure seated on a throne to an equestrian statue, were finally approved on November 19, 1882. The altitude at which to place the statue of Victor Emmanuel II was also set: 27 meters above sea level. The notice also specified the precise characteristics of the colonnade, behind which the civic tower of the Palazzo Senatorio, which is located just behind the monument, adjacent to the basilica of Santa Maria in Aracoeli, was to be imperatively seen.

During the meeting of the Commission on 19 September 1882, a controversy broke out between Agostino Depretis and some members of the Assembly, who did not appreciate the firm stance taken by the Prime Minister. These members of the assembly proposed that the equestrian statue of Marcus Aurelius, located in Capitoline Square, be moved to a museum for the monument, replacing it with a similar artifact representing Victor Emmanuel II of Savoy. Palazzo Senatorio would then be modified in its function, with its transformation to a monument celebrating Victor Emmanuel II and the Risorgimento with the creation of an upper loggia facing the square that would house the most important figures of this historical period. This proposal was later not followed up.

The point of Depretis' tough stance was related to the problems regarding the additional costs, which were large, but which were supposed, according to the Prime Minister, to take a back seat. Therefore, the Capitoline Hill was chosen because it was a hill in Rome located in the historic center of the eternal city, which was rich in historical symbolism, since it is on this very hill that the aforementioned Palazzo Senatorio and Tabularium are located. This was intended to emphasize and highlight Rome's role as the capital of Italy. In this regard, the official motivation drafted by the royal commission was:

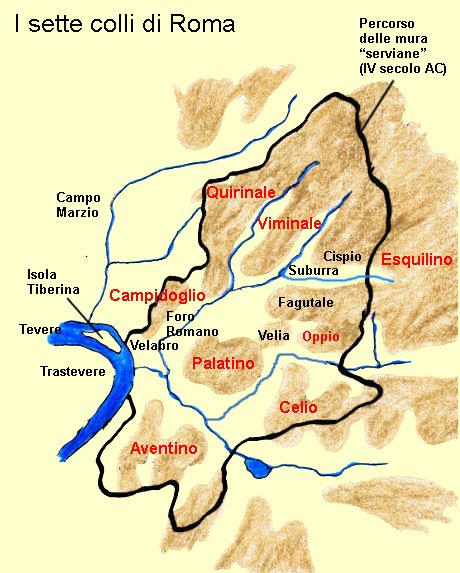
The seven hills of Rome: the Aventine, Capitolium (also called “Capitoline Hill”), Caelian Hill, Esquiline Hill, Palatine Hill, Quirinal Hill, and Viminal Hill. Also marked on the map are the Servian walls, part of which were found during the excavations necessary to build the Vittoriano

[...] [The chosen site would be the Capitolium] where the history of the political Italian Risorgimento would be grafted onto the memories of ancient Roman history. [...]

— Minutes of the Royal Commission for the Monument to Victor Emmanuel II.

The second reason for Agostino Depretis' decisive stance lay in political reasons: the Kingdom of Italy had recently launched its own colonial policy, and with the choice of the Capitoline Hill, an important political center of ancient Rome and thus a place of universal significance, it was also intended to emphasize the transnational tendencies of the newly formed state. Given the government's tough stance, which ended all discussion, the program for the second competition was published, on December 18, 1882, in No. 295 of the Official Gazette of the Kingdom of Italy:

[...] The monument will be built on the northern elevation of the Capitoline Hill, on the extension of the Via del Corso, and in front of it [...] it will be composed of the following parts: a) the bronze equestrian statue of Victor Emmanuel II [...]; b) an architectural background [...]; c) the stairs, which will rise to the new esplanade of the monument. [...] [The monument shall include] an architectural background of at least thirty meters in length and twenty-nine in height, left free in form but capable of covering the buildings behind and the lateral basilica of Santa Maria in Aracoeli. [...] The competitors shall [...] recall with art [...] the men and events which, always in relation to Victor Emmanuel, Father of the Fatherland, best cooperated with national independence and freedom [...]. [The future monument shall be a] Pantheon, vast shrine, destined to receive those who pioneered with thought, helped with their arms and sealed with blood the faith that triumphed with Victor Emmanuel. [...] [The monument shall then be dedicated to the king who] was not the first, but the only, was not the part but the whole” [...].

— Notice of construction of the Vittoriano, 1882

Participants in the competition, which ended on February 9, 1884, had one year to deliver their designs. Ninety-eight proposals were submitted: since the royal commission could not decide between the projects of Bruno Schmitz, Manfredo Manfredi, and Giuseppe Sacconi, it was necessary to announce a third competition, limited, however, to only these three proposals, which ended on June 24, 1884. Among the three projects, the commission then voted for that of Giuseppe Sacconi, a young architect from the Marche region, who thus won the competition and was commissioned to draw up the design of the upcoming Vittoriano.

== Design choices ==
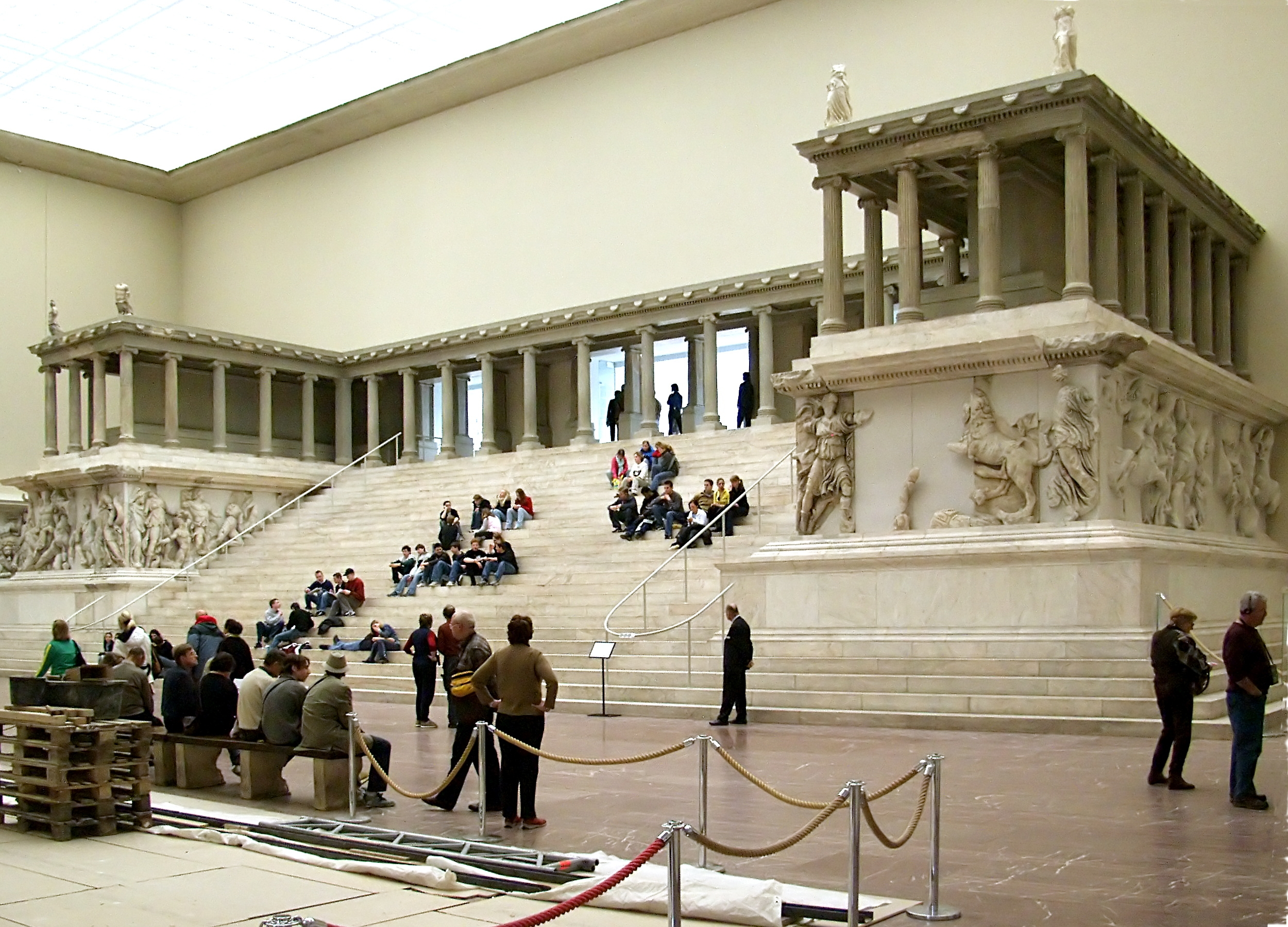
The facade of the Altar of Zeus at Pergamon, which is in the Pergamon Museum, one of the models for Ettore Ferrari and Pio Piacentini's design of the Vittoriano

Ettore Ferrari and Pio Piacentini's design was inspired by the great Hellenistic shrines, such as the Pergamon Altar in Pergamon and the Temple of Fortuna Primigenia in Palestrina. The Vittoriano was conceived as a large, modern forum open to citizens, located on a kind of elevated square in the historic district of Rome organized as an agora on three levels connected by tiers of steps, with conspicuous spaces reserved for visitors to stroll.

On its top there would have been a majestic portico characterized by a long colonnade and two imposing propylaea, one dedicated to the “unity of the fatherland” and the other to the “freedom of the citizens,” concepts metaphorically linked to the figure of Victor Emmanuel II of Savoy: it would thus have become one of the symbols of the new Italy, alongside the monuments of ancient Rome and those of Papal Rome. Having then been architecturally conceived as a large public square, the Vittoriano, in addition to representing a memorial dedicated to the person of King Victor Emmanuel II of Savoy, was invested with another role: a modern forum dedicated to the new free and united Italy.

From an architectural point of view, the monument was to consist of a series of staircases adapted to the steep sides of the Capitoline Hill. The entire monument, which would later appear as a kind of marble covering of the northern slope of the Capitol Hill, was to be charged with symbolic connotations related to the Risorgimento. The specific area for the construction of the monument was initially designated in Piazza dell'Esedra (the modern “Piazza della Repubblica”): later it was decided to construct the building north of the basilica of Santa Maria in Aracoeli, with the construction of a new square on the slopes of the Vittoriano, Piazza Venezia.

The original design of the Vittoriano (one of the grandest projects carried out in 19th-century Italy) called for the use of marble for the summit of the portico and travertine (the traditional stone of ancient Roman buildings) for the remaining part of the monument: however, the Vittoriano was later made entirely of Botticino marble, which is more easily shaped and more similar to the white marbles that ancient Romans used in their most representative buildings.

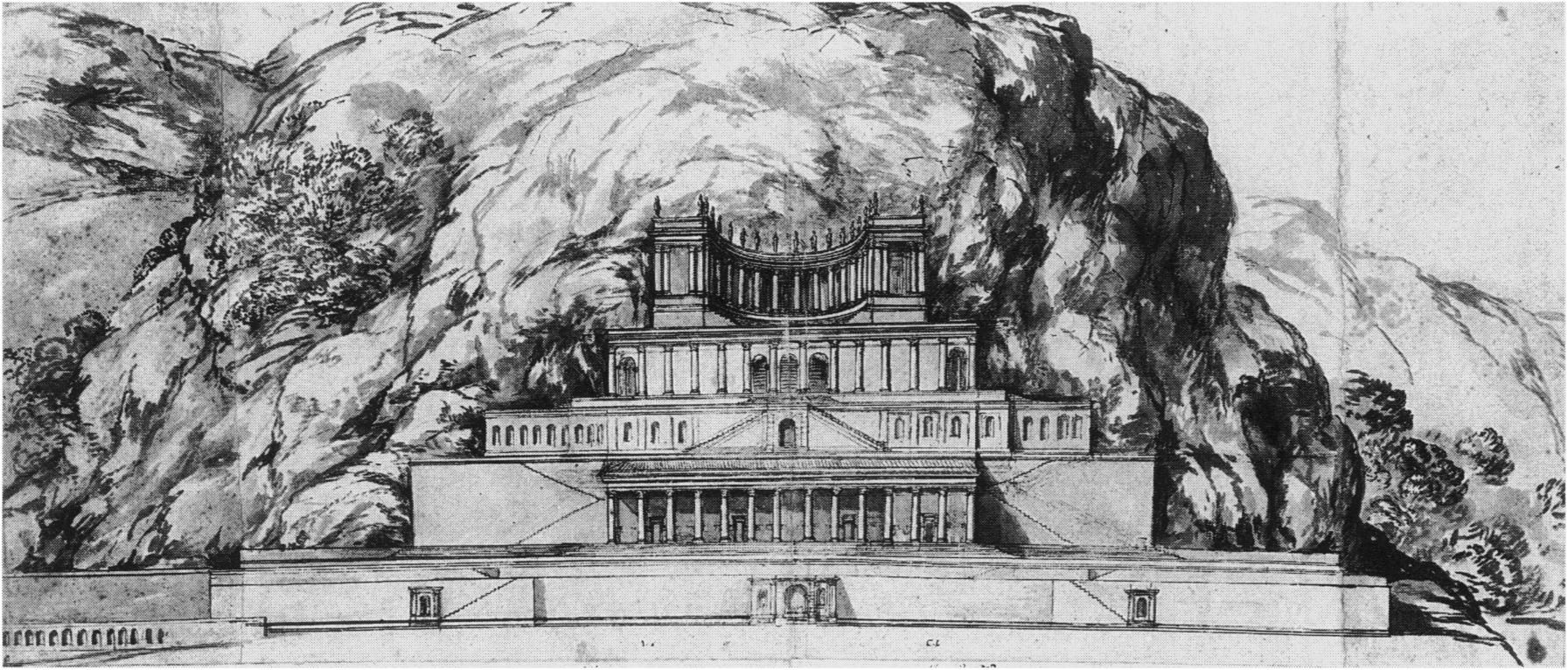
Pietro da Cortona's reconstructive hypothesis of the sanctuary of Fortuna Primigenia in Palestrina, one of the models for the Vittoriano project by Ettore Ferrari and Pio Piacentini

The first choice fell on Carrara marble, but a price demand deemed too high by the royal commission prompted it, on July 2, 1889, to decree the use of Botticino marble. Botticino marble was chosen mainly because of its chromatic peculiarities: compared to Carrara marble, which is characterized by absolute white, it has a white hue that possesses a slight tendency to straw yellow, a characteristic that gives this material a greater “warmth” than Carrara marble. Due to the change in the type of marble, which would have provided a different brightness, Giuseppe Sacconi was forced to revise the design, which was then subject to slight modifications.

Botticino marble takes its name from its quarrying area, Botticino, an Italian municipality northeast of Brescia, which is about 500 kilometers from Rome. The decision to replace the travertine chosen by Sacconi with Botticino marble thus generated much controversy, which originated from the distance from Rome to the Botticino marble quarries, which was deemed excessive: a few kilometers southeast of Rome, near Tivoli, there were in fact ample deposits of travertine, still widely exploited today in a multiplicity of quarries by numerous local companies. (Note: The very etymology of the word “travertine” (litus tiburtinum) is reminiscent of the many quarries near Rome. Cf. "Storia del travertino".) The use of travertine for buildings in Rome was typical as early as the Augustan age, with the exception of temples, for which marble was used.

The Vittoriano was therefore originally conceived by Sacconi with bichromatic shades, that is, with two dominant gradations, colors that originated from the use of two different cladding materials: travertine and Botticino marble. Subsequently, the decision to use only Botticino marble, which was taken by the royal commission in contrast to Sacconi's opinion, obliged the latter to enrich the Vittoriano with additional friezes, trophies, bas-reliefs and small statues, all placed along the Vittoriano's perimeter walls, which altogether provided the observer's eye with a visual impact comparable to the bichromatic effect due to the hypothetical use of two different cladding materials. In order to then draw the observer's eye to the upper portico, in lieu of a different covering material, Sacconi was obliged to revise the decorations of this part of the monument, which were made more lavish and conspicuous through the addition of some small statues.

=== The opening of the construction site and the archaeological findings ===
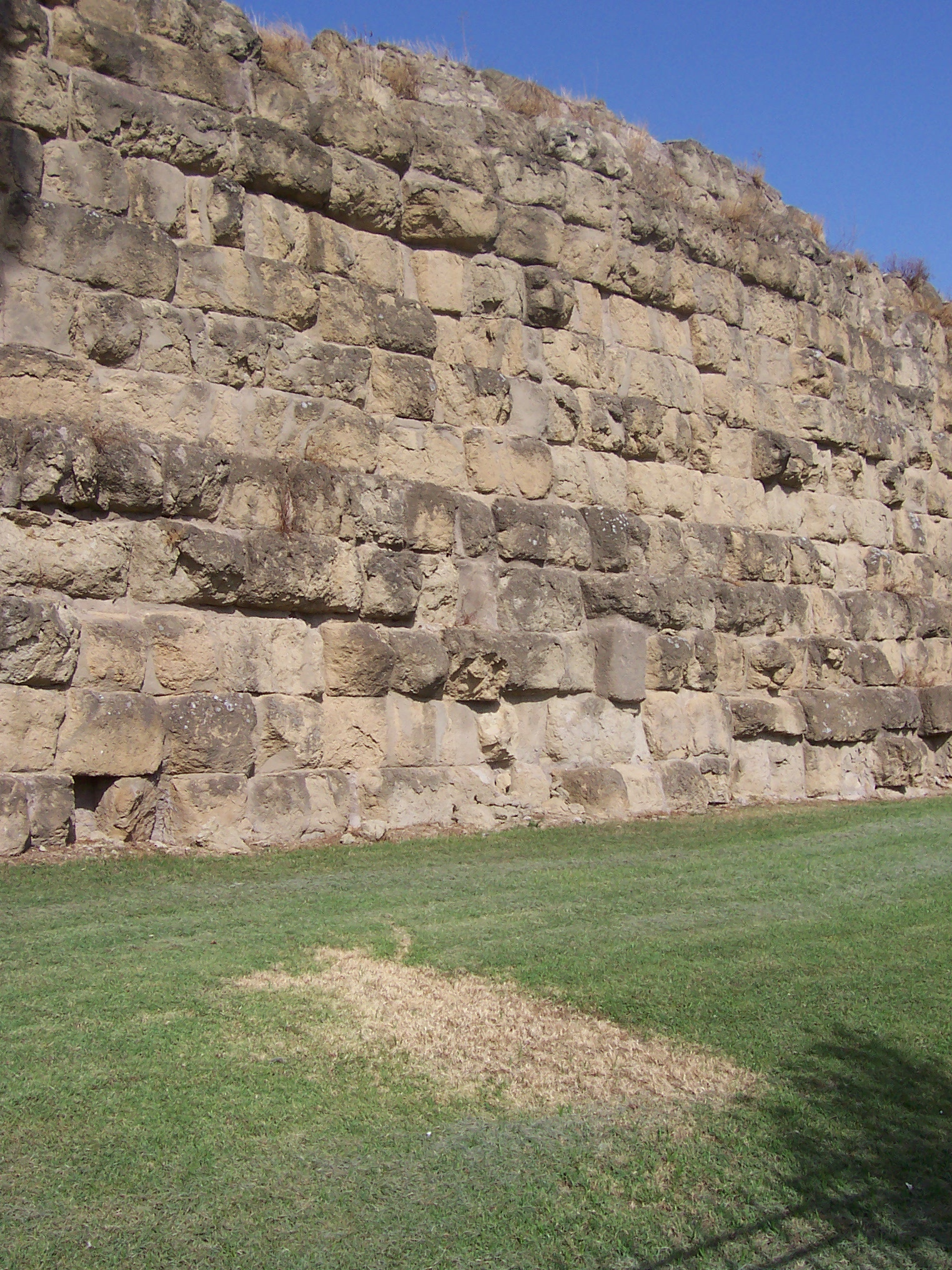
The Servian Wall visible at the Roma Termini train station, which is located near the Vittoriano

The direction of the work was entrusted, through a royal decree dated 30 December 1884, to Giuseppe Sacconi, with the official opening of the site on 1 January 1885. The solemn ceremony of laying the foundation stone of the Vittoriano took place on 22 March 1885 in the presence of King Umberto I of Savoy, Queen Margherita of Savoy and the entire royal family, as well as a large foreign delegation. The official speech was delivered by the Prime Minister Agostino Depretis, while the documents and parchment commemorating the inauguration were walled up in the third foundation pillar of the upper portico.

During the first excavations, in 1887, instead of the compact tuff on which the monument would stand, which everyone expected, river clay, sand banks and a conspicuous presence of caverns, tunnels and quarries were found. The caves and tunnels were partly expected, as it was known that the area had been excavated by the Romans in ancient times, but their presence on such a massive scale had not been anticipated.

Giuseppe Sacconi was obliged to modify the project and provide for the reinforcement of the tunnels with the construction of structures resting on their vaults. Some of the caves were later used during the Second World War (1940-1945) as air-raid shelters. During the excavations, a section of the Servian Wall, the first city wall dating back to the 6th century BC, i.e. to the time of the kings of Rome, was also discovered, as well as the remains of a mammoth, an extinct mammal that lived in prehistory: both findings were incorporated into the walls of the Vittoriano building (without destroying them, but leaving the possibility to inspect them), except for some parts of the fossil animal, which were transferred to the University of Rome. Many other Roman artifacts were then found, scattered over the entire site area, including remains of buildings, statues, capitals, everyday objects, etc.

The consequence of the discovery of the Servian Wall was a substantial modification of the project: two more foundation piers were added to the upper portico, in order to leave the archaeological remains found during the earthworks free and open to inspection. For this reason, the upper portico was more curved and its dimensions were changed, from 90 to 114 metres in length, with the number of columns, including propylaea, increasing from sixteen to twenty. The columns were also made more slender.

Due to the elongation of the upper portico, the overall view of the Vittoriano went beyond the planned limits, becoming the prominent element, from an architectural point of view, of Piazza Venezia. Originally, the Vittoriano had in fact been conceived as one of the many buildings in the square, without such a marked architectural prevalence: with its enlargement, it became necessary to intervene on the buildings in the square that were visually aligned with the new extreme limits of the Vittoriano, i.e. Palazzo Venezia and Palazzo Torlonia, which were both demolished, with the former being rebuilt considering the architectural novelty represented by the enlargement of the Vittoriano.

Another change during construction was the one conceived in February 1888, when Giuseppe Sacconi decided to provide interior spaces inside the Vittoriano. The idea came to him after the discovery of tunnels and caverns underground: some of them were then exploited to create part of the Vittoriano's interiors, i.e. rooms, crypts, galleries and corridors. These interiors would later house the Central Museum of the Risorgimento, the Shrine of the Flags and the Crypt of the Unknown Soldier.

This was also a necessity since it was no longer possible to place the Vittoriano's internal weight on the Capitoline Hill, so it was decided to exploit the galleries to create internal architectural spaces that would also have a structural function. The project was therefore also modified from an aesthetic point of view, as the Vittoriano was also to have windows and doors for the interior spaces, which were then placed on the building's perimeter walls.

Due to these changes, the cost of the work went from the initially estimated nine million liras to the final twenty-six and a half million. To build its foundations, 70,000 cubic metres of land had to be excavated.

== The demolition of surrounding buildings ==
=== Historical context ===
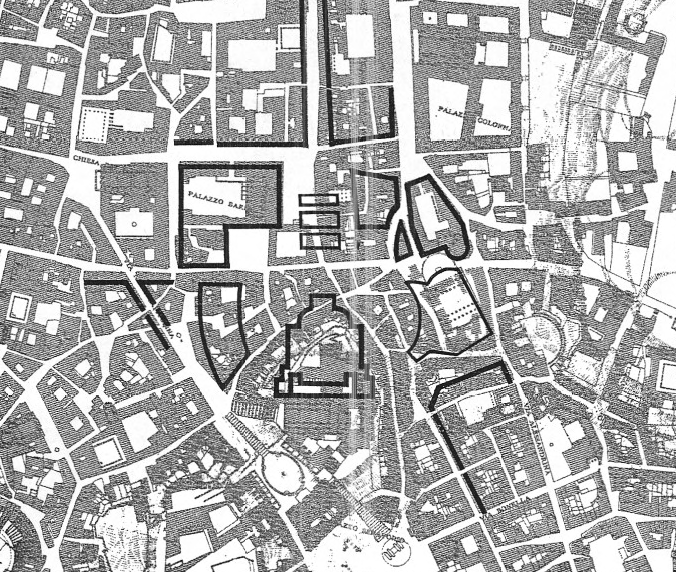
The area of the demolitions on the Capitoline Hill in Rome on a map of 1870, with the future Vittoriano and Piazza Venezia marked in black

In order to erect the Vittoriano it was necessary, between the last months of 1884 and 1899, to proceed with numerous expropriations and extensive demolitions of the buildings on the northern side of the Capitoline Hill, the one next to the basilica of Santa Maria in Aracoeli, where the monument was to be built.

The demolitions related to the Vittoriano were part of the project to change part of Rome's appearance to a more modern one: from the same period as the Vittoriano is, for instance, also the Palace of Justice, located in Piazza Cavour, in the then new Prati district, as well as the construction of Via Nazionale in these years, an artery aimed at connecting the railway station in Piazza dell'Esedra with the ancient centre in Piazza Venezia. Piazza Venezia, like many surrounding streets and squares, was embellished with flower beds and trees.

The changes for Rome were therefore considerable, also because they also involved the road system, with the construction of new roads that were made by demolishing many buildings, such as Via Nazionale and Corso Vittorio Emanuele II. Many existing roads were widened and their routes straightened and entire neighbourhoods were demolished and rebuilt, such as the Roman Ghetto. The strong anticlericalism due to the Roman Question also led to the demolition of many old religious buildings in Rome.

In this context it was deemed necessary to provide the city with infrastructure and buildings, including symbolic ones such as the Vittoriano, that would emphasise its role as capital of the newly-born Kingdom of Italy. Initially the idea was to build a new district to the north-east of the historical centre where the administrative and political centre of the capital could be realised, an idea that was implemented decades later, during Fascism, with the construction of the EUR district, which was however built for another reason: to host the Universal Exhibition, which never took place due to the outbreak of the Second World War. The idea of a new district was therefore initially discarded and it was decided to concentrate these new administrative buildings in the historical centre of Rome: this resulted in a massive acquisition, many times followed by demolitions, of old palaces, monasteries, etc.

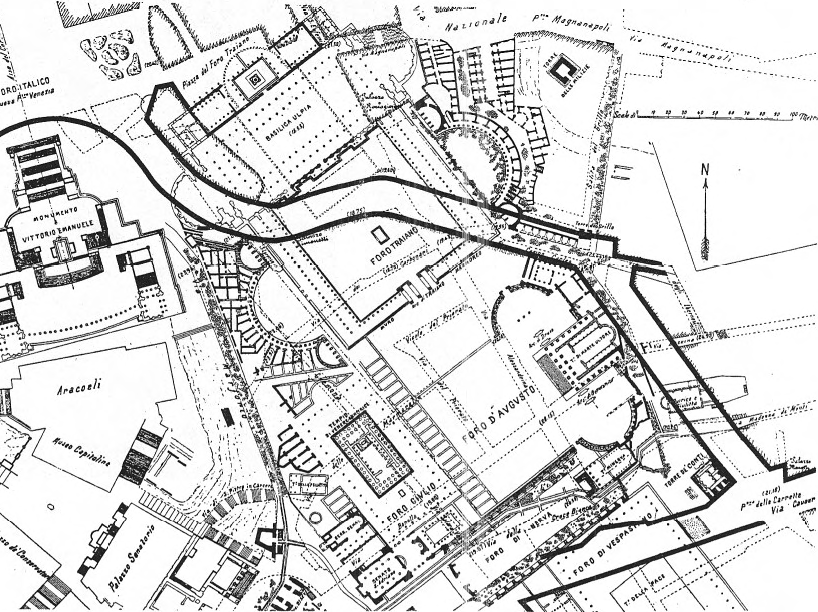
The demolition area on the slopes of the Capitoline Hill in Rome on a 1903 map, with the future Via dell'Impero (the modern Via dei Fori Imperiali) marked in black, which was built decades later, during Fascism. On the left, towards the top, one can recognise the silhouette of the Vittoriano

The overall aim was also to make Rome a modern European capital that would rival Berlin, Vienna, London and Paris by overcoming the centuries-old urban planning of Papal Rome. In this context, the Vittoriano would have been the equivalent of Berlin's Brandenburg Gate, London's Admiralty Arch and the Opéra Garnier in Paris: these buildings all share a monumental and classical appearance that metaphorically communicates the pride and power of the nation of which they are the symbol.

There were two obstacles to this goal: the lack of important modern buildings in the city centre to complement the historic ones, whose presence was conspicuous, and the size of Rome's city centre, which was small compared to other Italian cities. In 1870, the year Lazio was annexed to the Kingdom of Italy, Rome was the fifth largest Italian city after Naples, Milan, Genoa and Palermo.

The urban growth of the new capital, which was formally established on 1 July 1871 with the transfer of the Royal Court and the political and administrative class from Turin to Rome, was planned with the first three general plans approved in 1873, 1882 and 1909. As a result, the capital's population grew from 212,000 in 1871 to 660,000 in 1921 and 1,150,000 in 1936, an increase that made Rome the third most populous city in Italy after Naples and Milan in 1921, the second most populous city in Italy after Milan (which had by then reached the top of the ranking) in 1931, and the most populous city in Italy in 1936, a position it has never lost: with more than a million inhabitants, Rome once again reached the population it had during the golden age of the Roman Empire.

This conspicuous immigration was linked to the relocation of tens of thousands of bureaucrats, which was also followed by bankers and speculators. One of the reasons that prompted the Italian ruling class to decide on organizing a vast demolition campaign was the aforementioned aversion against Papal Rome, and all its buildings. The conspicuous urbanistic changes that Rome experienced after 1870 were the most profound in its history, at least considering the short period of time in which they took place. Associated with these works, which involved urban planning, were works for the implementation and improvement of services, such as the construction of new bridges over the Tiber River, the installation of new drinking water distribution systems and the construction of sewers.

=== The demolitions related to the construction of the Vittoriano ===
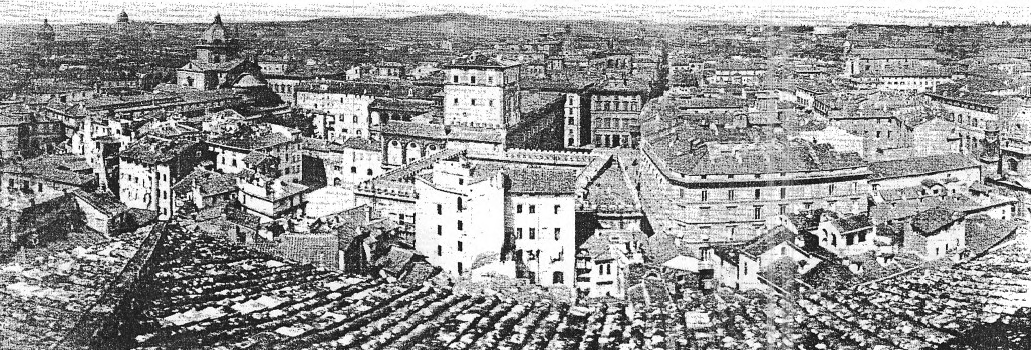
The future Piazza Venezia, seen in the center of the image (it is the clearing to the right of Palazzo Venezia, recognizable by the presence of a tower. To the right of the clearing can be seen Palazzo Torlonia, which was later demolished), seen from the side of the Capitoline Hill where the Vittoriano would be built, in an 1870 photograph

The first demolitions had already been carried out for the foundation stone-laying ceremony: in particular, several private homes and the Franciscan garden, which was part of the Ara Coeli convent, were demolished. The site chosen was in the heart of Rome's historic center and was therefore occupied by ancient buildings that provided the neighborhood with an urban design dating back to the Middle Ages.

The demolitions were deemed necessary because the Vittoriano was to be built in the heart of the historic district of Rome, in a modern urban context, in front of a large new square, the future Piazza Venezia, which at the time was a narrow square in front of the palace of the same name. Indeed, the symbolic meaning of the monument was modern: the celebration of the new free and united Italy. This series of demolitions also involved the enlargement of the adjacent Piazza d'Aracoeli.

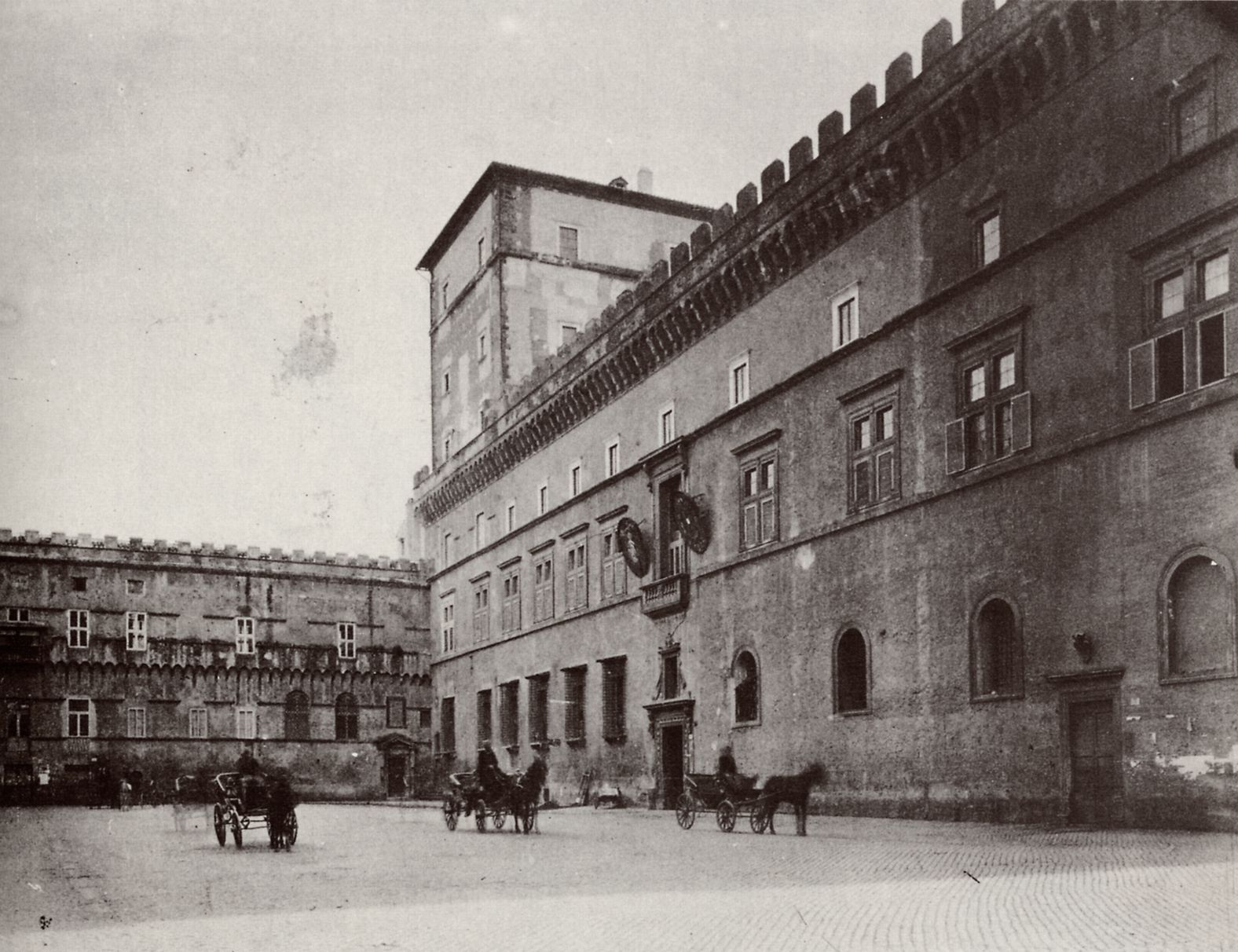
Piazza Venezia as it appeared before the start of demolitions for the construction of the Vittoriano.

As already mentioned, Piazza Venezia was completely redesigned. From the year 1900 to 1906 work was carried out, based on the ideas of Giuseppe Sacconi, to enlarge it and make it more regular in shape and symmetrical with respect to the Vittoriano: previously its boundaries, which were much more limited than those of the present square, followed the ancient buildings that stood there, from which resulted an irregular shape of the square. In particular, Palazzo Venezia was demolished and then rebuilt further west, and Palazzo Torlonia was also demolished.

The demolitions were carried out through a precise program established by Agostino Depretis, president of the Council of Ministers of the Kingdom of Italy. The demolition works, and consequently those for the construction of the Vittoriano, proceeded expeditiously due to special urban planning tools made available by the government. All demolitions, thus including those necessary to build the Vittoriano, went through the scrutiny of the royal commission that decided, among the hundreds of buildings, or archaeological remains, which ones to preserve and which ones could be destroyed.

Several personalities spoke out against the demolitions, including Rome Mayor Leopoldo Torlonia and archaeologist Rodolfo Lanciani. In parliament, on the other hand, it was Ruggiero Bonghi, on May 10, 1883, who vehemently attacked the demolitions, that prompted the municipal administration of Rome, with the mayor at the head, to present a formal protest against the expropriations and the resulting demolitions.

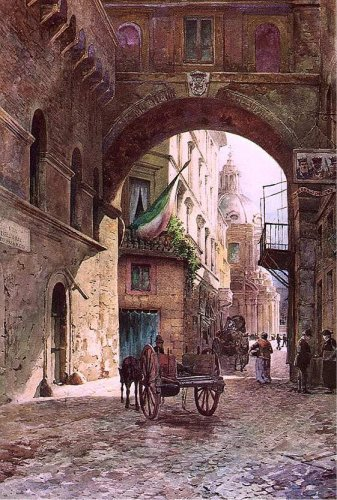
The arch of San Marco in 1880, demolished along with the surrounding neighborhood for the construction of the monument

All the archaeological finds that still lay underground in that area of the Capitolium would also have been lost, as they were destroyed. To these criticisms were added those of Ferdinand Gregorovius, a German historian famous for his studies on medieval Rome, and Andrea Busiri Vici, president of the National Academy of San Luca. Conversely, there were also favorable opinions, such as that of art historian Giovanni Battista Cavalcaselle and that of architect Camillo Boito, who were instead in favor of the demolitions, albeit with the appropriate distinctions.

After the debate that ensued (one of the places where the discussion was most heated, as already mentioned, was the Rome City Council), the authorities decided to proceed with the demolitions. The stance of Prime Minister Agostino Depretis, who judged such buildings to be expendable, considering the symbolic gain from the construction of the work in that very place, was decisive.

Following a survey by experts on June 26, 1883, which was the last one before final approval for the work, the vast neighborhood on the northern slope of the Capitoline Hill, where the Vittoriano was to be built, was thus demolished, consisting of medieval and Renaissance buildings, and many historical constructions such as the papal villa commonly known as the Tower of Paul III were demolished, the overpass connecting with Palazzo Venezia (the so-called “arch of St. Mark”), the three cloisters of the Franciscan convent of the Ara Coeli (the basilica of the same name was spared and still stands adjacent to the Vittoriano), the church of Santa Rita da Cascia in Campitelli (which was rebuilt elsewhere), the barracks of Santa Caterina da Siena, Palazzo Tiberi and all the minor buildings present on the slopes of the hill.

In this way, some of Rome's historic streets and related neighborhoods disappeared, such as Via Della Pedacchia, Via Di Testa Spaccata, Via Della Ripresa Dei Barberi, and Via Macel De' Corvi, while other streets, which were not erased from the maps, were turned upside down, with the demolition of all the blocks of buildings that stood on their sides, such as Via Giulio Romano, Via San Marco, and Via Marforio. Part of the demolitions were carried out to allow a view of the monument from Via del Corso and Via Nazionale. The total area that was razed was 19,200 square meters.

== The equestrian statue of Victor Emmanuel II ==
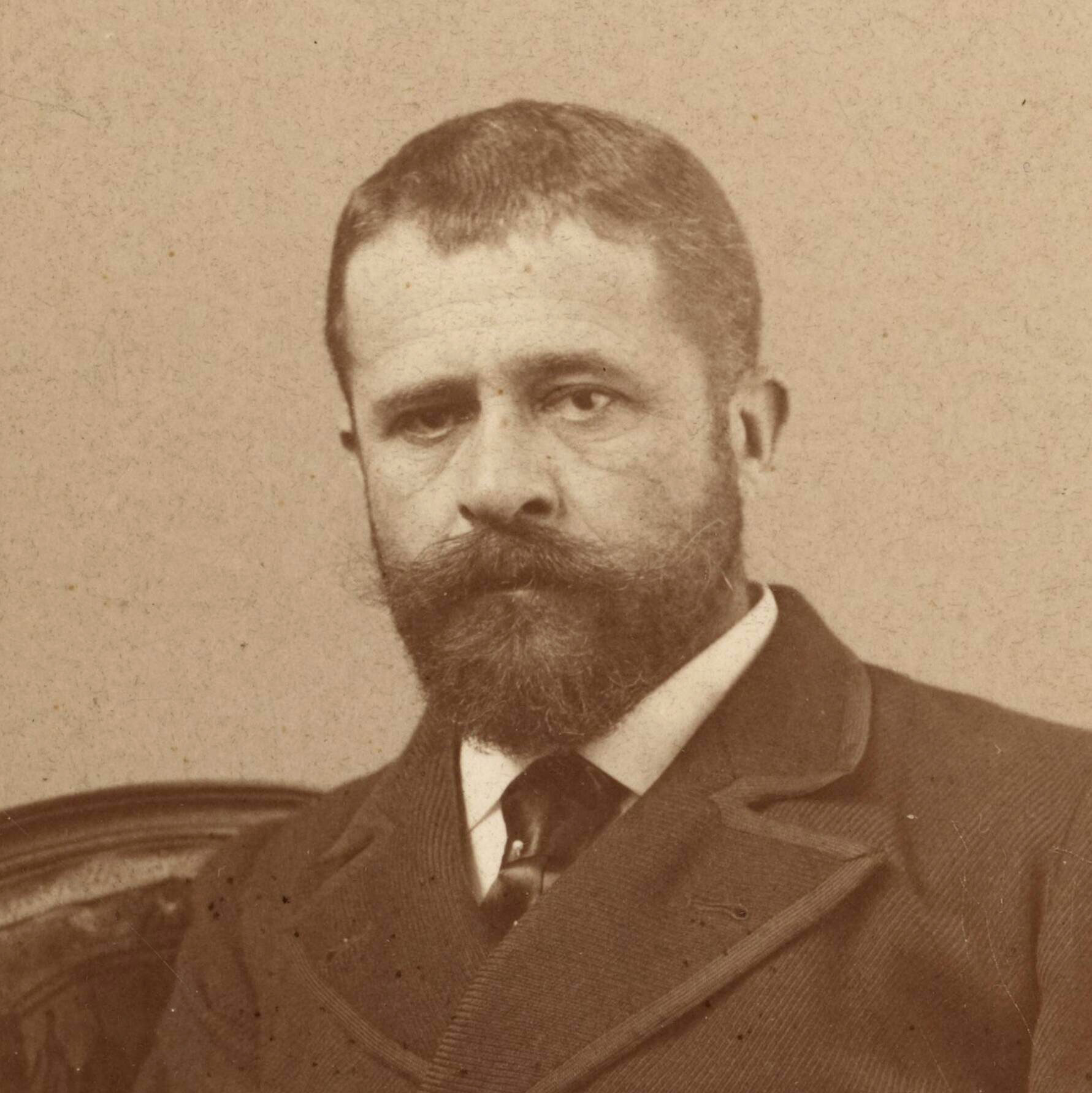
Enrico Chiaradia, author of the equestrian statue of Victor Emmanuel II

The construction of the equestrian statue of Victor Emmanuel II, the first work to be created and the architectural centerpiece of the entire monument, was entrusted by the royal commission, after another competition called on February 9, 1884, to Enrico Chiaradia as early as April 1889, on the very day the competition for the construction of the Vittoriano ended.

The genesis of the statue was not devoid of controversy: in fact, Chiaradia and Sacconi disagreed on its features. Chiaradia had in mind a very realistic statue, while Sacconi was thinking of a more classical sculpture, thus more idealistic and allegorical, which would better match the style of the Vittoriano.

In the end Chiaradia won, with the statue later completed by Emilio Gallori, since its creator had died in 1901. Gallori made changes to Chiaradia's design following the suggestions of the royal commission: the goal was to make the difference between the style of the statue and that of the Vittoriano less jarring. It was also proposed that a new statue be created from scratch, but this idea was shelved in favor of a slight reinterpretation of the work being made.

The statue was cast with bronze from some cannons of the Royal Army, and then mounted on the marble base where allegorical personifications of the fourteen “noble” cities of Italy were carved between 1907 and 1910. The “noble” cities depicted are the capitals of the ancient pre-unification Italian monarchies and maritime republics, the birth of which can be attributed to a period prior to the Savoy monarchy: for this reason they were considered the “noble mothers” of Risorgimento Italy.

On the occasion of King Victor Emmanuel III of Savoy's visit, the authorities decided to offer refreshments to a small group of guests from among those who had participated in the project. The event was set up inside the belly of the bronze horse, which was able to accommodate more than twenty people, as evidenced by period photographs, copies of which are displayed on the Vittoriano's rear terrace.

All the artwork created for the Vittoriano, including the equestrian statue of Victor Emmanuel II, involved the major artists then active in Italy.

== The continuation of the work ==
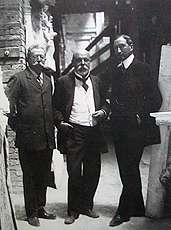
From left: Gaetano Koch, Manfredo Manfredi and Pio Piacentini at the Vittoriano construction site

The decision to include within the Vittoriano an “altar” dedicated to the homeland was made by Giuseppe Sacconi only after the design phase, during the construction work on the monument. The suggestion had apparently come from Giovanni Bovio, a philosopher and Republican deputy, who suggested to Sacconi the creation, in one part of the monument, of an Altar of the Fatherland modeled on similar civic altars built in France during the same period.

The place and the dominant subject were chosen immediately: a large statue of the goddess Roma that would be placed on the first terrace after the entrance to the monument, just below the equestrian statue of Victor Emmanuel II. Thus the Altar of the Fatherland, at least initially, before the burial of the body of the Unknown Soldier, was thought of as a sacellum of the goddess Roma. In this way, the greatness and majesty of Rome, elected to the role of the legitimate capital of Italy, was celebrated. This reference is not an exception: there are numerous artistic works in the Vittoriano that recall the history of ancient Rome.

On June 4, 1890 King Umberto I visited the construction site. This was an opportunity for Sacconi to assemble all the minor changes to the project that he had submitted to the royal commission over time and produce an updated drawing of the Vittoriano to show to the Sovereign: this drawing represented the second general design of the monument after the original one.

As time passed, the overall concept of the Vittoriano was transformed, due to changes made to the design during the course of the project, from a stern monument closed in on itself from an architectural point of view, to a modern forum open to Piazza Venezia. A major change to the design was made around the year 1900, after an interruption of work that lasted from 1896 to 1898 due to lack of funds: the original two-staircase entrance was changed to a single entrance flanked by two fountains, the “fountains of the seas”.

After Giuseppe Sacconi's death in 1905, construction work on the Vittoriano continued under the direction of Gaetano Koch, Manfredo Manfredi and Pio Piacentini, who prepared the fourth general design of the Vittoriano: the third design was instead carried out by Pompeo Passerini, Adolfo Cozza and Giulio Crimini in 1906, that is, by the three close collaborators of Sacconi who temporarily took over the reins of the construction site after his death, and a plaster model of it, later lost in a fire, was shown to the public at the International Exhibition in Milan.

With this fourth and final project, the Vittoriano took its final form: a monument characterized by allegorical works of art with the exception of the equestrian statue of Victor Emmanuel II, which is a depiction of a real person who existed, over which the Altar of the Fatherland stands out symbolically. With the construction of the Altar of the Fatherland, the Vittoriano changed its function: from a memorial dedicated to the person of King Victor Emmanuel II of Savoy having also the function of a modern forum of Italy it became a secular temple designed, at least initially, as an altar of the goddess Roma. This new metaphorical meaning of the Vittoriano, characterized by a universal significance, was also remarked upon by the conspicuous presence of allegorical artistic works that conveyed the same meaning.

In 1906, by royal decree dated May 17, the “National Committee for the History of the Risorgimento,” forerunner of the modern institute of the same name, was established. In the same decree the location of this committee was decided: the Vittoriano. At the same time, it was decreed that the Vittoriano, in its interior, would also house the “Cultural Center for Studies and Research on the Risorgimento,” as well as a museum and library on the subject. Earlier, in February of the year 1900, there was the transfer of the management of the construction site from the “Royal Commission for the Monument to Victor Emmanuel II” to the Ministry of Public Works.

In the years leading up to 1911, the year in which the Vittoriano was inaugurated, final changes were made to the design, an update that resulted in the final version of the monument. This last revision of the design, which included lowering the balustrades of the terraces and modifying some of the staircases (which were made more rectilinear), was aimed at further slimming the structure upward with the goal of giving the impression that the Vittoriano was the natural architectural continuation of Piazza Venezia.

== The debate over the subjects to be represented ==
The first proposal regarding the subjects to be depicted in the eight statues on the base of the third terrace for those coming from the entrance of the Vittoriano, that is, the one at the base of the upper portico, envisioned a list of illustrious men of the Risorgimento that included Giuseppe Garibaldi, Giuseppe Mazzini, Terenzio Mamiani, Massimo d'Azeglio, Camillo Benso, Count of Cavour, Manfredo Fanti, Luigi Carlo Farini, and Vincenzo Gioberti. In a second list Manfredo Fanti was replaced by Guglielmo Pepe, Massimo d'Azeglio by Daniele Manin and Terenzio Mamiani by Bettino Ricasoli. Another idea was to place these statues on either side of the Vittoriano's entrance staircase.

Since the choice of which illustrious men to represent could not be made, the proposal was made to carve scenes of the breach of Porta Pia on one side and the 1870 Rome plebiscite on the other. Other themes were proposed that departed from those of the Risorgimento. For example, the hypothesis of sculpting characters from ancient Rome was advanced, namely Romulus (who would allegorically represent the Origin or Redemption), Marcus Furius Camillus (the Liberation), Publius Cornelius Scipio (the Conquest), Cornelia (the Domestic Virtue), Gaius Julius Caesar (the Glory), Augustus (the Empire), Virgil (the Poetry), and Aemilius Papinianus (the Law), but again the discussion was heated, with various counterproposals on the choice of the characters to be portrayed. In the end, no decision was made, and the choice fell, decades later, on the placement of altars representing the “redeemed” cities, that is, the cities united with Italy following World War I and in the years immediately following: Trieste, Trento, Gorizia, Pula, Zadar and Fiume. Their placement was carried out between 1929 and 1930.

With regard to the subjects to be portrayed on the side of the goddess Roma, that is, on the first terrace for those coming from the entrance of the Vittoriano, subjects that were to pay homage to the personification of the eternal city through precise poses, the first idea was to sculpt along the base of the entire terrace, which is fifty meters long, a procession of prominent personalities of the Risorgimento converging toward the center, where the statue of the goddess Roma would be located. The proposal was welcomed by the Parliament of the Kingdom of Italy, since the subject was closely related to Victor Emmanuel II, whose equestrian statue would be located right above that of the goddess Roma. Another proposal was to portray thinkers such as Dante Alighieri, Niccolò Machiavelli, Galileo Galilei, Cola di Rienzo, Leonardo da Vinci, Giordano Bruno, Christopher Columbus and Virgil.

However, Sacconi rejected all the proposals related to historical figures: witnessing the discussions that were taking place to choose the subjects to be portrayed on the third terrace for those coming from the entrance of the Vittoriano, which were going nowhere because of the profound political meanings that such a choice could convey, he proposed to portray allegorical figures throughout the monument: the only non-symbolic representation of the Vittoriano, and therefore related to a historical figure, would be the equestrian statue of Victor Emmanuel II. Compared to the initial idea, the choice to instead portray allegorical figures, i.e., abstract and generic concepts through concrete and precise images (e.g., personifications of virtues, feelings, etc.), made the meanings conveyed by the Vittoriano's artistic presence more universal, since the concepts were detached from real historical people who had a precise and circumstantial life history.

The choice of subjects to be represented alongside the goddess Roma was delegated to a public competition that took place in 1908. This competition, in addition to choosing the artist to be entrusted with the work, left the sculptors free to propose the precise subject of the side depictions, without prejudice to the presence at the center of the statue of the goddess Roma. The winner was Angelo Zanelli, who proposed Virgil's Bucolics and Georgics, which were unveiled, together with the statue of the goddess Roma, in 1925 on the occasion of the Christmas of Rome (April 21).

== The inauguration ==
The names by which the Vittoriano is known

The “National Monument to Victor Emmanuel II” is referred to by two other names: “Vittoriano” and “Altare della Patria,” which from the inauguration to the present are the names most commonly used to call the monument.

Since 1921, when the Unknown Soldier was buried under the statue of the goddess Roma in the part of the Vittoriano that is called the “Altar of the Fatherland,” the use of that expression to refer to the entire structure and not just the place of the soldier's burial has taken on new vigor. The Unknown Soldier is an Italian soldier who died in World War I whose identity remains unknown; he is the symbol of all those who died and were missing in the war. The custom of calling the entire Vittoriano by the expression “Altar of the Fatherland” was a result of a process of metonymy fostered by the symbolism of the Unknown Soldier, which was greatly felt by the population.

The monumental complex was inaugurated in front of a huge crowd on June 4, 1911, on the occasion of the events related to the national exhibition during the celebrations of the 50th anniversary of the Unification of Italy, by King Victor Emmanuel III of Savoy.

The ceremony was also attended by Queen Elena, the Queen Mother, namely Margherita of Savoy, and the remainder of the royal family, including Maria Pia of Savoy, daughter of Victor Emmanuel II and Queen Mother of Portugal, who had recently been deposed by the revolution that had established the republic the previous year. Also present were Prime Minister Giovanni Giolitti, the six thousand mayors of Italy, veterans of the wars of the Risorgimento, and three thousand Roman school students.

Among the veterans of the wars, both those who had been part of the Royal Army and the Garibaldini, noteworthy were the last survivor of the Constituent Assembly that proclaimed the Roman Republic of 1849 and the three Garibaldini who paraded a tricolor flag during the Trentino campaign (a military operation of the Third Italian War of Independence led in 1866 by Giuseppe Garibaldi) and the Battle of Dijon (a clash fought between 1870 and 1871 during the Franco-Prussian War; the flag was carried by Italian volunteers who decided to participate externally in this conflict in support of the Prussian ally): this flag was badly damaged by machine-gun fire, so much so that only the green ribbon, close to the mast, remained intact, while the white ribbon was completely frayed.

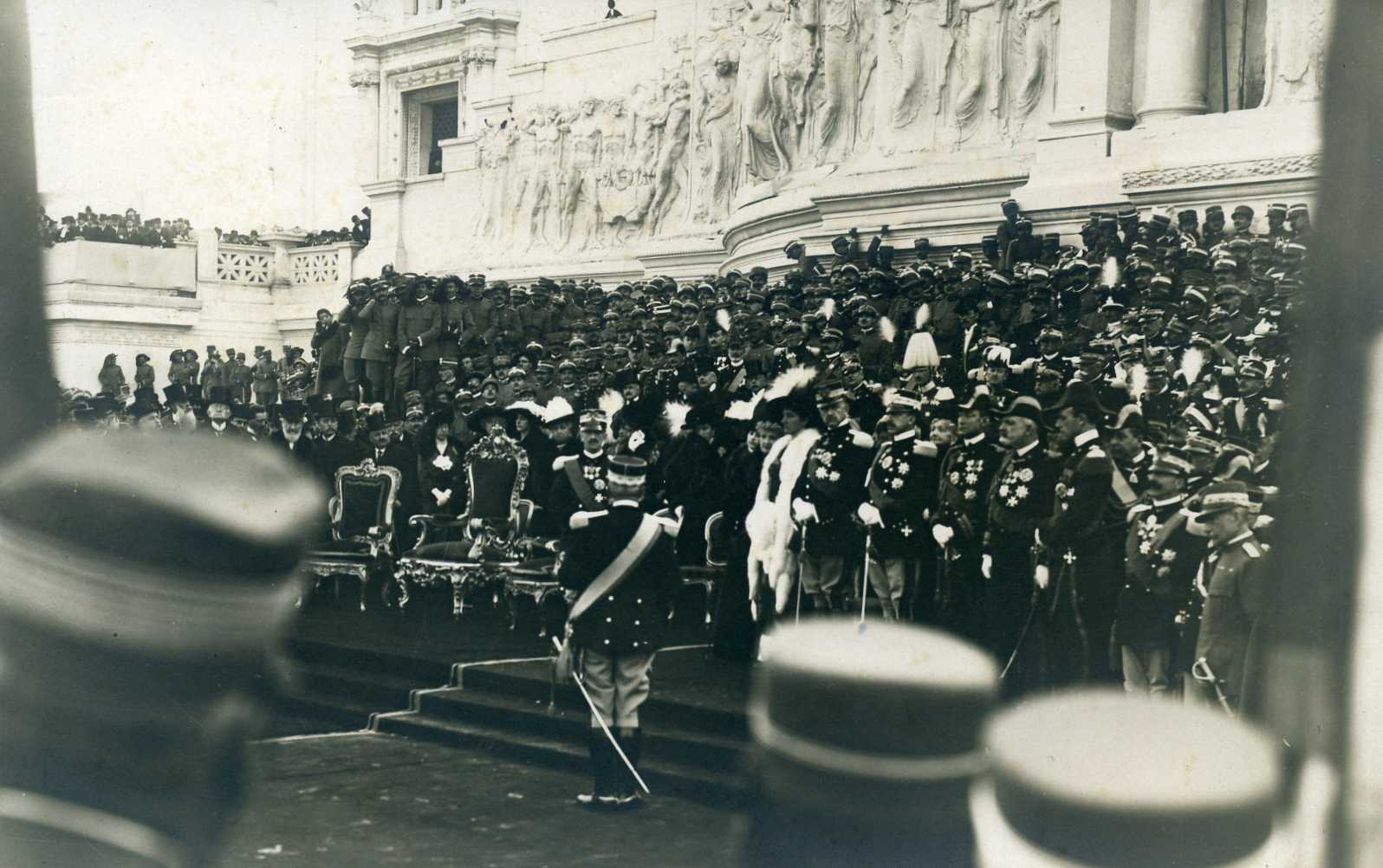
A moment of the inauguration ceremony of the Vittoriano (June 4, 1911)

The moment of the inauguration was represented by the solemn uncovering of the cloth covering the equestrian statue of Victor Emmanuel II, a gesture that was performed after a nod from Giolitti, who took the order from King Victor Emmanuel III of Savoy. Shortly before, Giolitti had delivered the official inauguration speech, the opening part of which he recited:

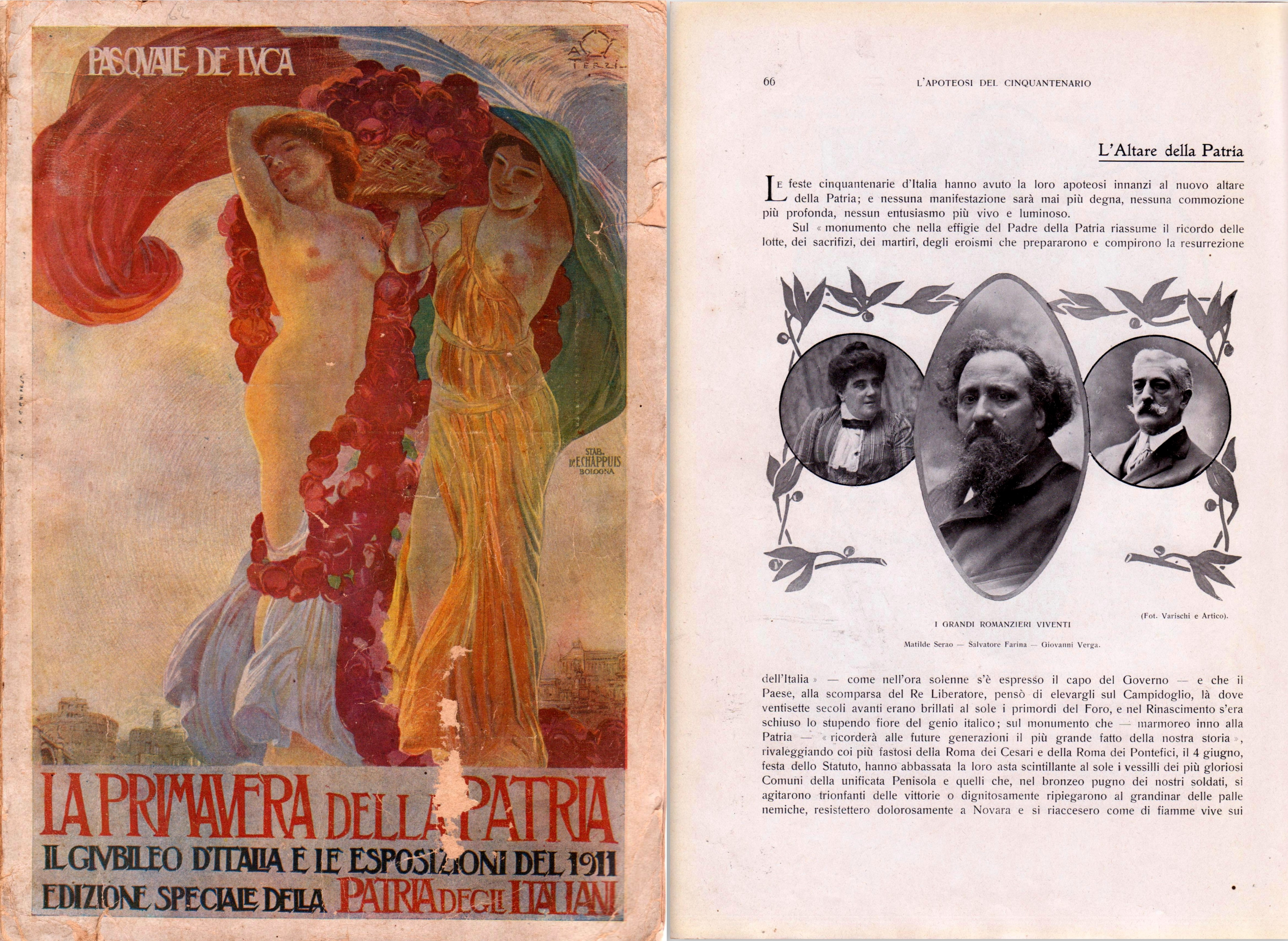
Volume from 1911, on the fiftieth anniversary of the Unification of Italy, in which the monument, inaugurated that very year, is called the “Altar of the Fatherland”

Above this hill that recalls the glories and greatness of Rome [...] worthily the National Monument is inaugurated, which in the effigy of the Father of the Fatherland summarizes the memory of the struggles, sacrifices, martyrs, and heroisms that prepared and accomplished the resurrection of Italy. [...]

— Giovanni Giolitti

The atmosphere during the opening ceremony of the Vittoriano was marked by an intense unified and national spirit. Nevertheless, despite this conciliatory atmosphere there were dissident voices. The solemn event was opposed by the socialists (at that time led by the maximalist wing, which was the most intransigent and radical one) because of their internationalist ideology, which is the antithesis of the patriotism that was later expressed during the inauguration of the Vittoriano, and the republicans, who were critical of this ceremony given the unquestionable monarchical connotations that the monument possessed.

The total cost of the construction of the Vittoriano, which was built in the centre of ancient Rome and reached modern Rome through streets that radiate from Piazza Venezia, was about 30 million liras. 70,000 cubic meters of land had to be excavated to build its foundations.

== The Tomb of the Unknown Soldier ==
=== The selection of the body and the train journey ===
After World War I, the Altar of the Fatherland was chosen to house the tomb of the Unknown Soldier, that is, an Italian soldier who died during World War I, whose identity remains unknown due to the severe wounds that made the body unrecognizable: for this very reason it represents all Italian soldiers who died during the wars. The reason for its strong symbolism lies in the metaphorical transition from the figure of the soldier to that of the people and finally to that of the nation: this transition between increasingly broad and generic concepts is due to the indistinct features of the soldier's non-identification.

The choice of the body to be buried at the Altar of the Fatherland in a tomb that would become the Monument to the Unknown Soldier was made from eleven unidentified bodies of Italian soldiers, which were selected by a special commission established by the Ministry of War. The choice of the eleven corpses was not random; each came from a specific area of the Italian front in World War I (Rovereto, the Dolomites, the Highlands, Mount Grappa, Montello, Lower Piave, Cadore, Gorizia, Lower Isonzo, Mount San Michele, and Castagnevizza del Carso).

The eleven coffins were then taken temporarily to Gorizia and then transferred to Aquileia. Meanwhile, inside the monumental complex of the Altar of the Fatherland in Rome, the tomb that would house the Unknown Soldier was built; the body of the unknown Italian soldier would be buried under the statue of the goddess Roma, in front of the equestrian statue of Victor Emmanuel II of Savoy.

The choice of the body to be solemnly buried at the Altar of the Fatherland was entrusted to Maria Bergamas, the mother of Antonio Bergamas, an irredentist volunteer from Gradisca d'Isonzo (a Friulian municipality annexed to the Kingdom of Italy only after the war), who had deserted from the Austro-Hungarian army to join the Italian army and who had died in combat without his body ever being found.

The soldier's body to be buried at the Altar of the Fatherland was chosen on October 28, 1921 in the Basilica of Aquileia. Maria Bergamas was led in front of the eleven coffins lined up, which she inspected as she collapsed to the ground in front of the tenth coffin on which, for this reason, the choice fell.

The coffin thus selected was then placed on the gun carriage and laid on a railway hearse followed by sixteen other carriages, which was designed for the occasion by Guido Cirilli: the body was escorted to the railway convoy by a number of veterans decorated with the gold medal of military valor. The other ten bodies that remained in Aquileia were buried in the war cemetery surrounding the Roman temple, in the Tomb of the Ten Unknown Soldiers.

The journey of the chosen body to the capital was made by train pulled by two steam locomotives of the FS Class 740 (one of them, unit 740.115, is preserved in the National Railway Museum of Pietrarsa), on the Aquileia-Rome line, passing through Udine, Treviso, Venice, Padua, Rovigo, Ferrara, Bologna, Pistoia, Prato, Florence, Arezzo, Chiusi, and Orvieto at a very slow speed so that at each station the population had an opportunity to honor the fallen. Many Italians waited, sometimes for hours, for the convoy to pass in order to honor the body of the Unknown Soldier.

=== The burial ceremony ===
A bronze Star of Italy was placed on one of the two locomotives pulling the railway hearse, while a second one was depicted on the main building of the Roma Tiburtina station, then known as “Portonaccio station,” which welcomed the convoy to its final destination. The flags of all the regiments of the Italian Armed Forces and representatives of the combatants, widows and mothers of the fallen, with King Victor Emmanuel III of Savoy at the head, welcomed the arrival of the body by moving to meet the Unknown Soldier; the latter was then carried by a group of those decorated with gold medals to the basilica of Santa Maria degli Angeli e dei Martiri.

The body of the Unknown Soldier was buried in a solemn ceremony at the Altar of the Fatherland on November 4, 1921 on the occasion of National Unity and Armed Forces Day, and since then his grave has always been guarded by a guard of honor and two flames that burn perpetually.

The ceremony on November 4, 1921 was the most important and well-attended patriotic event in united Italy, as one million people took part in it. This celebration also represented the recovery by Italians of the patriotic spirit that had been watered down by the suffering endured during World War I. The Altar of the Fatherland, originally conceived as an altar of the goddess Roma, thus also became the sacellum of the Unknown Soldier.

Socialists and communists also participated: they were linked to an internationalist ideology by definition, and thus were officially opposed to this celebration because of its strong patriotic connotations. Moreover, socialist political forces, during the parliamentary debate that later led to Italy's participation in World War I, were partly opposed to the country's direct intervention in this conflict. However, the socialists honored the Unknown Soldier by calling him a “proletarian torn by other proletarians.”

The Vittoriano was thus consecrated to its ultimate symbolic value, becoming - due to the recalling of the figure of Victor Emmanuel II of Savoy and the creation of the Altar of the Fatherland - a secular temple metaphorically dedicated to free and united Italy and celebrating - by virtue of the burial of the Unknown Soldier - the sacrifice for the fatherland and for the ideals connected with it.

== The completion ==
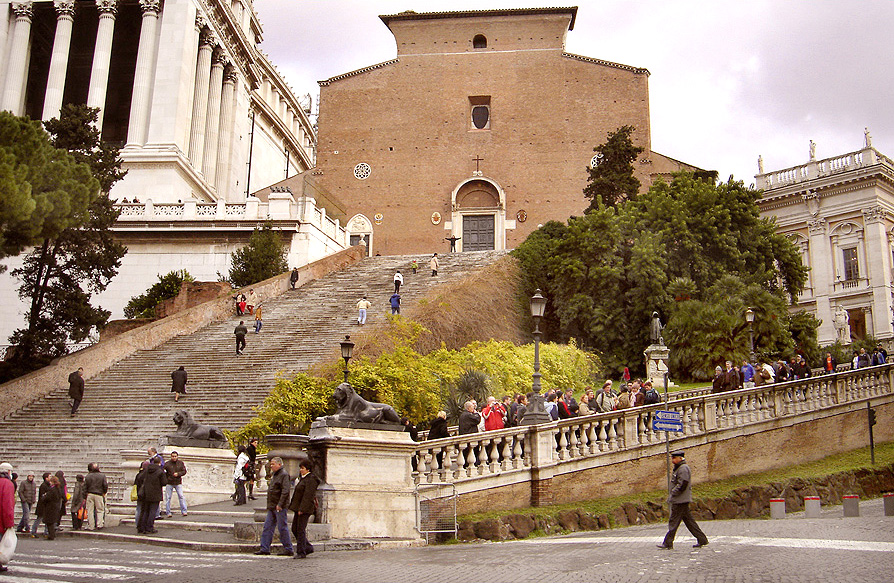
Ara Coeli Basilica. On the left the Vittoriano can be seen

The Vittoriano in these years (and until the 1940s) was an appreciated national symbol, an example of “modern” art, standing alongside the monuments of ancient Rome and those of Papal Rome, that is, relating to the two periods when Italy was one of the centers of world history; Primo Levi, already in the early 20th century, explained the choice of erecting the Vittoriano on the Capitoline Hill, which he metaphorically called the center of the “Third Rome,” recalling a future and hypothetical third epoch in the history of Italy, after ancient Rome and Papal Rome (the latter was seen as the natural consequence of the former: the “boundary” between the two was the fall of the Western Roman Empire), during which the city of Rome could again become a reference point for the world:

“[...] Italy was under an obligation to elevate the Third Rome next to the first two [...]”

— Primo Levi referring to the location of the Vittoriano

The proximity of the “Third Rome” to the other two also indirectly conveyed the concept of unity, i.e., one of the ideals of the Risorgimento, whose goal was precisely Italian unification from a political, social and administrative point of view: the location of the Vittoriano in the heart of Rome's historic district is linked precisely to this political context. Another concept that conveyed the decision to build the Vittoriano, the center of the “Third Rome,” close to the other two, was that it would be impossible to completely separate these three historical eras, the results of which had been stratified over time giving rise to the Rome, and by reflection Italy, of the time.

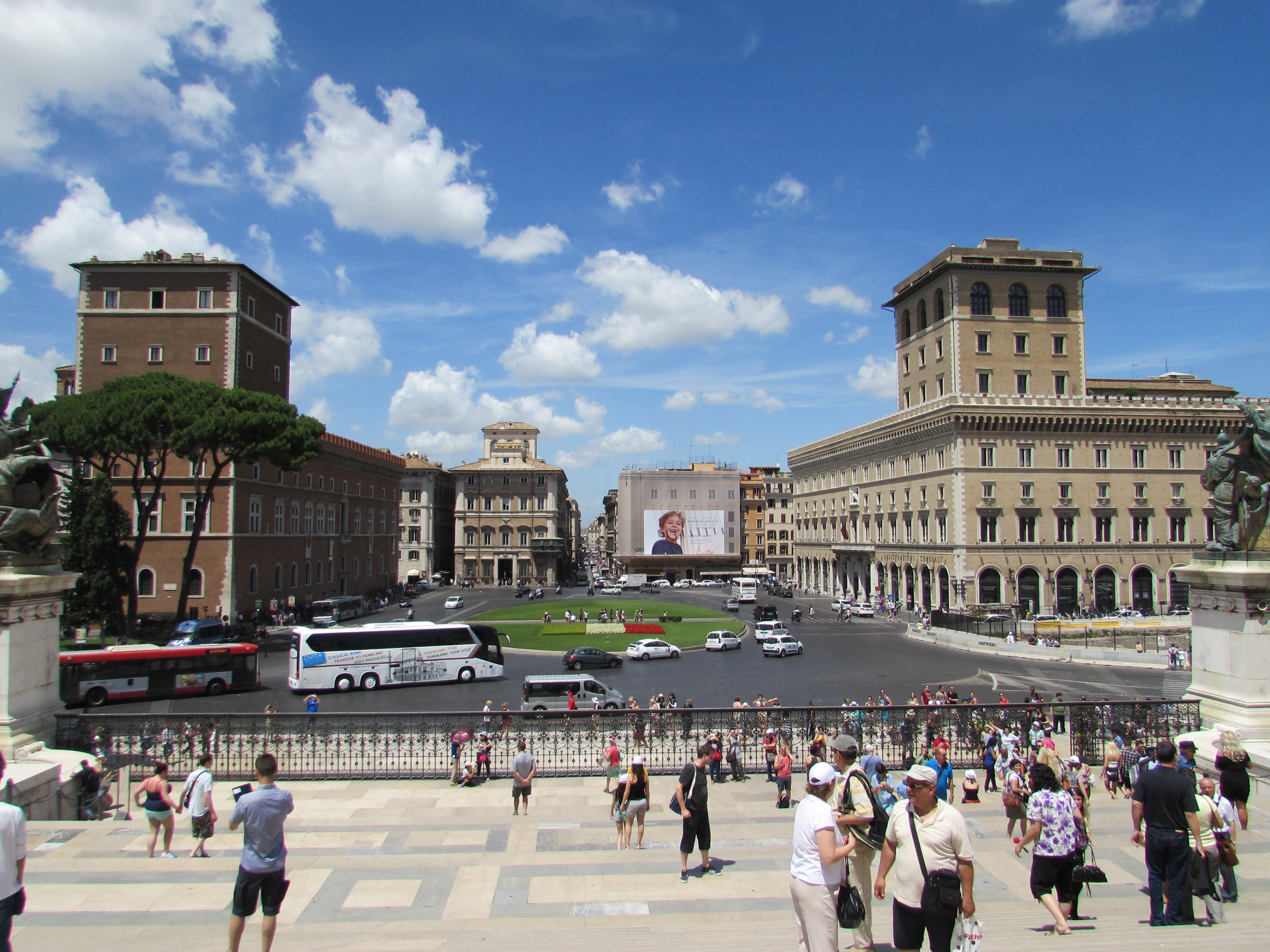
Piazza Venezia as seen from the entrance of the Vittoriano. Note the Palazzo delle Assicurazioni Generali (right), Palazzo Venezia (left) and Palazzo Bonaparte (left of the entrance to Via del Corso). In the center is a hedge in the shape and colors of the flag of Italy.

Many of the most famous landmarks of ancient Rome, such as the Colosseum, the Imperial Fora, Trajan's Column, the Theatre of Marcellus, the Servian Wall and the Palatine Hill, as well as those of Papal Rome, are visible from the highest terraces of the monument, such as St. Peter's Basilica in the Vatican, the Quirinal Palace, the basilica of St. John Lateran, basilica of St. Mark the Evangelist on the Capitoline Hill, the church of St. Mary of Loreto, the Capitoline Cordonata, and the basilica of Maxentius. The Janiculum Hill, with busts of patriots, would then also be visible in the distance, which is instead an expression of the new post-Risorgimento Italy. Among them, the closest monument that can be seen from the top of the Vittoriano is the bell tower of the Palazzo Senatorio, which is located just behind the monument, adjacent to the Ara Coeli basilica.

In 1925, on the occasion of the Christmas of Rome (April 21), the missing part of the Altar of the Fatherland was unveiled, namely the sculptures made by Angelo Zanelli that stand next to the statue of the goddess Roma. With the creation of the quadriga of Unity and the quadriga of Liberty, which were placed on their respective propylaea between 1924 and 1927, the exterior spaces of the Vittoriano could be said to be completed. In this context, the “Royal Commission for the Monument to Victor Emmanuel II” was dissolved on February 19, 1921.

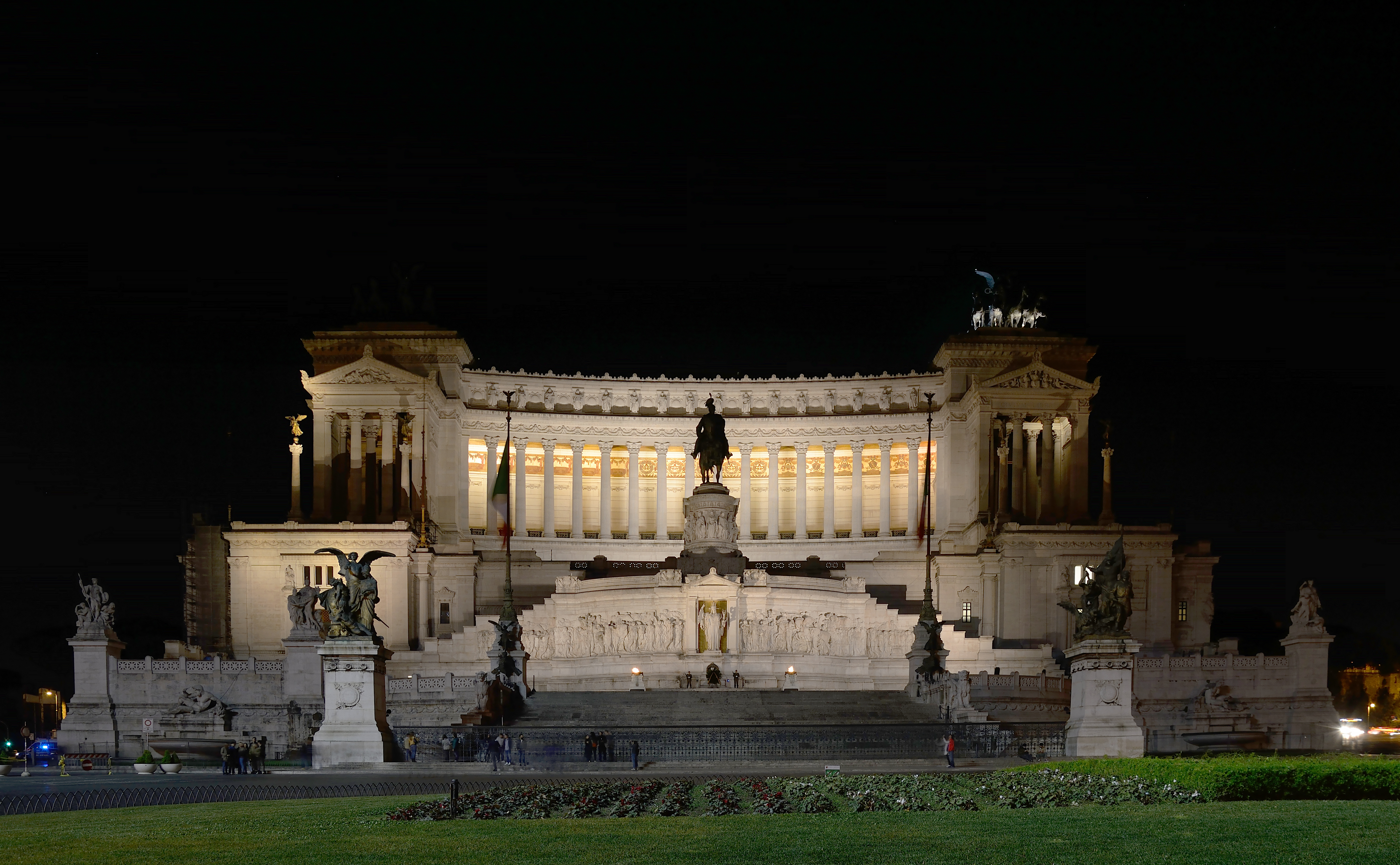
The Vittoriano at night

In 1928 it was decided to fix the area adjacent to the Vittoriano by opening Via del Teatro di Marcello; this involved dismantling the seventeenth-century church of Santa Rita in Campitelli, which stood at the foot of the steps of the Ara Coeli basilica and was rebuilt, ten years later, near the Theatre of Marcellus. Excavation work brought to light the Insula dell'Ara Coeli, dating from the second century AD, which is still visible today on the left side of the Vittoriano. The landscaping of the area around the monument was completed between 1931 and 1933 by architect Raffaele De Vico, who designed the two tree-lined exedras with travertine steps.

In contrast, the Crypt of the Unknown Soldier was inaugurated during the May 24, 1935 event, which was dedicated to the 20th anniversary of Italy's entry into the First World War. This place is a room located under the equestrian statue of Victor Emmanuel II, from which it is possible to see the side of the Tomb of the Unknown Soldier that faces the interior of the Vittoriano. It is thus located at the Altar of the Fatherland, from which, on the other hand, one can see the side of the Tomb of the Unknown Soldier facing the outside of the building.

Work to complete the Vittoriano eventually took place in 1935, with the creation of the Central Museum of the Risorgimento, which was inaugurated and opened to the public decades later, in 1970. The occasion also included the creation of a Flag Memorial, designated to house an exhibition of historic Italian military flags. It was preceded by the transfer inside the Vittoriano of the war flags of the dissolved regiments that were previously located in Castel Sant'Angelo: the Flag Memorial was also inaugurated and opened to the public decades later, on November 4, 1968, on the occasion of National Unity and Armed Forces Day.

The completion of the interior spaces, including the Crypt of the Unknown Soldier (with mosaics by Giulio Bargellini), was the work of Armando Brasini, former artistic director of the Vittoriano. The same architect also designed the buttressed brick elevation on Via di San Pietro in Carcere. In this context, in 1939, the management of the Vittoriano passed from the Ministry of Public Works to the Ministry of Education.

== Fascism ==
=== The Vittoriano becomes a military symbol ===
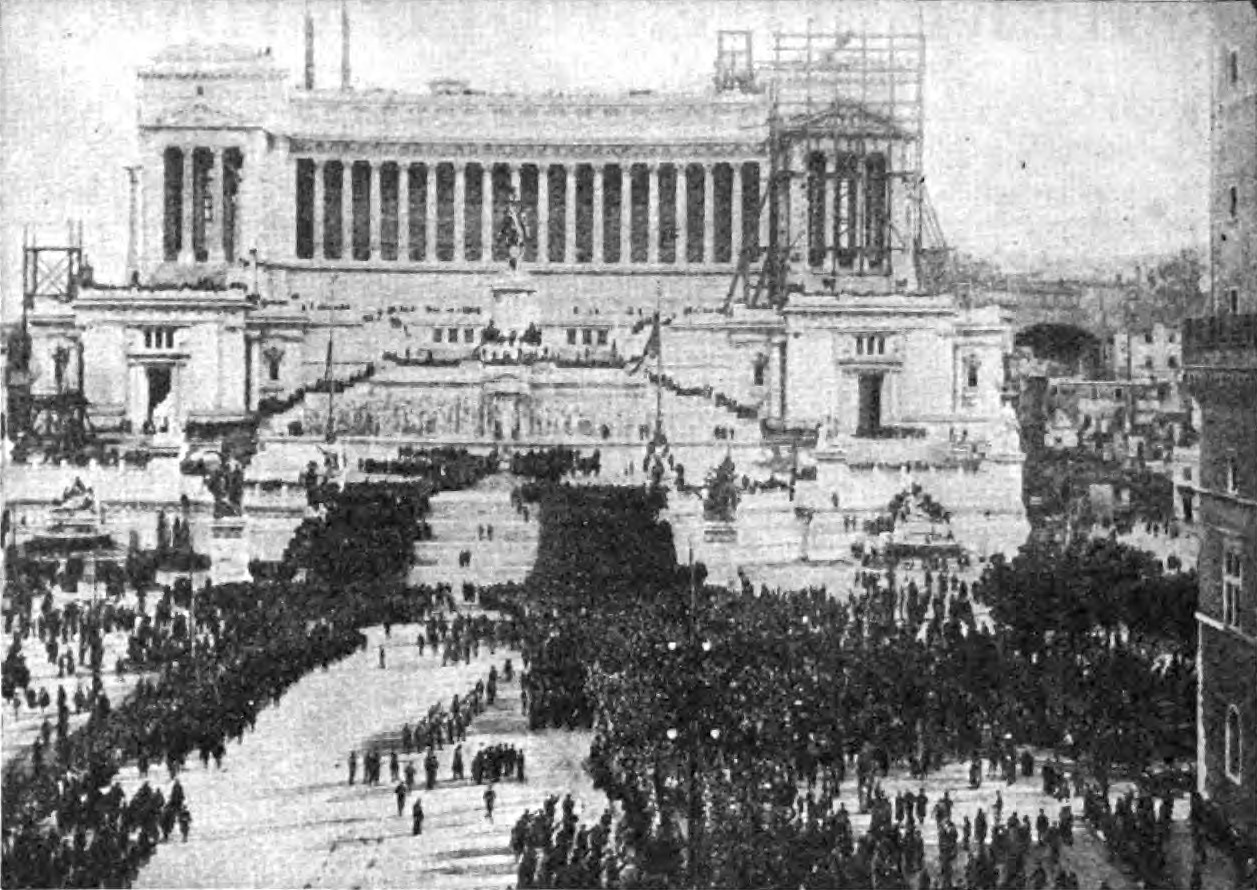
The Vittoriano during the concluding stage of the March on Rome (October 28, 1922). Note the absence of the statues of the quadrigas, which were placed on top of the propylaea only later, between 1924 and 1927

With the advent of fascism, the Vittoriano became one of the stages of the regime led by Benito Mussolini. The politicisation of this place began as early as 1920, before the burial of the Unknown Soldier (1921) and the March on Rome (1922), due to the anti-Socialist and anti-Bolshevik demonstrations organised by nationalist and patriotic parties in the Vittoriano before the municipal elections of October 1920 and the general elections of May 1921.

The Vittoriano was also charged with symbolic significance by Mussolini, who chose it as the final stage of the March on Rome: on this occasion, the famous fascist demonstration ended with a tribute to the tomb of the Unknown Soldier. This was no accident: given its high representative value linked to the First World War, fascism provided the Vittoriano with a new symbolism, one linked to the militarization of Italian society, which were one of the founding pillars of the political program of the party founded by Benito Mussolini.

With World War I over and not ending according to expectations, so much so that its denouement was referred to as a “mutilated victory” because of the failure to comply with the London Pact (Italy had to give up some of the lands promised by the pact: northern Dalmatia and the “mandates” over the former German colonies and the non-Turkish territories of the former Ottoman Empire), Fascism made this issue one of its political agendas, often recalling the suffering and sacrifices suffered by the Italian people during the war.

Thus the Vittoriano, for the second time, changed its metaphorical meaning. From its original symbolism related to the celebration of the person of King Victor Emmanuel II of Savoy and its role as the modern forum of Italy, and from the subsequent transformation into a secular temple that took place with the construction of the Altar of the Fatherland, the Vittoriano also became one of the symbols of Italy's military redemption. Mussolini, when he accepted from King Victor Emmanuel III the task of forming his first government, indirectly recalled the symbolism of the Vittoriano, as he uttered the words, “[...] I bring to Your Majesty the Italy of Vittorio Veneto, reconsecrated by victory. [...]"

After the March on Rome, through which Benito Mussolini gained power, the Vittoriano increasingly became a place where fascism organized its demonstrations. From being a secular temple where the prevailing sentiment was that of remembrance of those who had fallen in the war, the Vittoriano was transformed into a place where there was a continuous reminder of Italy's patriotism and military might. On the steps of the Vittoriano were thronged some of the public who attended the speeches proffered by Benito Mussolini from the famous balcony of Palazzo Venezia, which overlooked the square of the same name, opposite the Vittoriano.

From this time on, Piazza Venezia, and with it the Vittoriano, became the focal point of the regime's propaganda. Considering that the reference to Roman-ness was one of the cornerstones of the regime's propaganda, the choice of Piazza Venezia was no accident: in addition to the Vittoriano, the Colosseum and the Imperial Fora, for example, were also in its vicinity.

In order to establish the Vittoriano in the collective imagination of Italians, Fascism, from the late 1920s, made a massive propaganda effort, also taking advantage of the nascent Italian film industry, which led the Vittoriano to be a constant presence in regime films, the background of which was often the panorama of Rome. From 1928 to 1943, the Vittoriano appeared in 249 regime films distributed in Italian cinemas: 168 of these appearances (67.4 percent of the total) were related to a tribute to the Unknown Soldier, while in the remaining 81 (32.5 percent) the Vittoriano was the scene of a fascist event organized within its walls.

=== Demolitions carried out by fascism ===
In this context, the architect and engineer Gustavo Giovannoni proposed the construction near Piazza di Spagna of a monument comparable to the Vittoriano celebrating Fascist Italy, a project that was not followed up. This was not the only point of contact between liberal and fascist Italy: both aimed to forge a “new Italy,” and both had imperialistic tendencies. What differentiated them, however, was the way they wanted to pursue this goal: liberal Italy by leaving free will to the citizens, the fascist regime by coercion and violence.

During Fascism Rome experienced, for the second time in the history of united Italy after the aforementioned upheavals of the late 19th century, a massive demolition of historic buildings. The general project of radical change, both urbanistic and in terms of the monumental presence, of the capital was called “Great Rome” by fascism. Again, the goal was to provide the capital with a more modern appearance that was more related to the political situation of the time. Fascism, in particular, considered the reshaping of the capital's appearance as one of the government's priorities.

The most important urban planning work that was carried out was Via dell'Impero (the modern Via dei Fori Imperiali), which connects Piazza Venezia, where the Vittoriano stands, to Piazza del Colosseo. For the construction of this major thoroughfare, which took place between 1931 and 1932, a considerable number of historic buildings, both civil and religious, were demolished, destroying about 5,500 housing units. With the demolitions carried out during the Fascist regime, three macro-areas of Rome characterized by a homogeneous historical and architectural context were created: the “Monumental Rome,” which in turn is divided into Ancient Rome and Papal-Renaissance Rome; “Modern Rome,” the one built after the breach of Porta Pia (1870); and “Modern or Fascist Rome.”

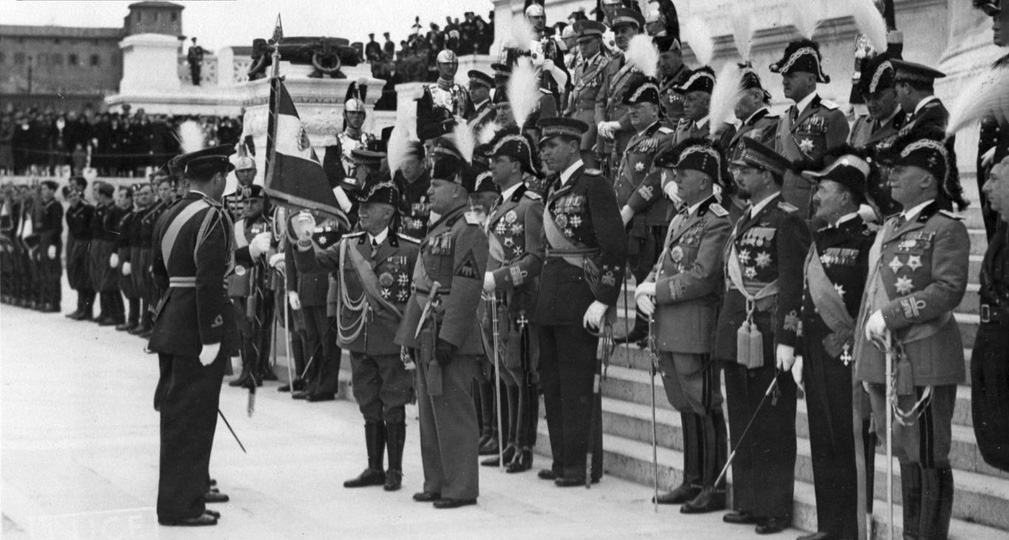
Military ceremony at the Vittoriano attended by King Victor Emmanuel III (c. 1930)

The Vittoriano, with the demolitions carried out by Fascism, was now fully visible from Via del Corso, with the corresponding perspective and scenic consequences: previously, the monument dedicated to Victor Emmanuel II, from the aforementioned point, could barely be glimpsed. Moreover, the Vittoriano was now also easily recognizable from the Colosseum, from which one could then take Via dell'Impero and reach Piazza Venezia. Fascism also found it necessary, as had happened a few decades earlier, to widen and rectify the route of many existing thoroughfares, with the aim of giving more air and light to the buildings and to make traffic along the streets smoother. Unlike the demolitions of the 19th century and the beginning of the following one, during the Fascist regime all voices against the demolitions were silenced.

Added to these new arteries was Via del Mare, which connected Rome with the port of Ostia, with the center of the new road system formed by the aforementioned road axes gravitating around Piazza Venezia, and with it around the Vittoriano. More generally, the changes to the urban planning of Rome, and the concomitant work of demolition and construction of new buildings, carried out during the Fascist era, including work done around the Vittoriano, were deeply influenced by the regime's great nationalistic ambition: the declared goal was to make a real Third Rome provided with roads, buildings and monuments that would live up to the goals of Fascism.

Fascism, however, did not limit itself to demolishing historic buildings and constructing new ones, but carried out a vast renovation of ancient monuments with a view to providing Rome with a double distinctiveness: modern capital of the new Italy and a city strongly characterized by the presence of historical evidence. The latter aspect was especially related to the history of ancient Rome, for which fascism had a veritable cult. Fascism also carried out extensive restoration of the capital's monuments and historic buildings. The restorations were not only motivated by historical and artistic reasons: buildings and monuments were often restored with great consideration for the modernization of antiquity, which was linked to the political conditions of the time. Often the restored buildings and monuments were the backdrop for the celebration of the regime, of which the Vittoriano was the protagonist many times.

However, the greatest losses, from an artistic and historical point of view of Rome's monumental heritage, occurred in the first two decades after the breach of Porta Pia, that is, in the 1870s and 1880s. The demolition works ordered by Fascism suffered a setback due to the outbreak of World War II and then were finally cancelled in 1946, with the conflict having just ended. Rome's 1962 master plan then decreed the exact opposite: the preservation of the historic center and its monuments.

The goal associated with the construction of Via dell'Impero was to create a new major road connecting Piazza Venezia, where the Vittoriano stands, with Piazza del Colosseo via the Imperial Fora. With it many streets of Rome disappeared from the maps, such as Via Cremona, Via Bonella, Via della Croce Bianca, Via di San Lorenzo ai Monti, Via delle Marmorelle and Via della Salaria Vecchia. The Velian Hill, one of Rome's hills, also disappeared and was flattened. The work of demolishing the buildings around the Vittoriano that had been started at the end of the 19th century was also completed between 1926 and 1933. Fascism, in order to make the demolitions and related reconstructions more expeditious, abolished the aforementioned “Archaeological Commission,” assigning its powers directly to the government.

As a consequence of these demolition and construction works, Piazza Venezia, and with it the Vittoriano, found itself at the urbanistic center of the district, with five streets converging on it, the most important of which was Via dell'Impero. Piazza Venezia was also completely redone, with the planting of tree exedras. The Vittoriano was thus not only the protagonist of many events that were organized within its perimeter, but also became a symbolic backdrop for celebrations, rallies, and parades that took place on Via dell'Impero.

=== The Vittoriano transformed into one of the stages of the regime ===
With the advent of Fascism, the Vittoriano became one of the regime's stages for events aimed at displaying Italy's military virtues. It was a secondary role, however, as military parades took place along Via dell'Impero (the modern Via dei Fori Imperiali) with the Vittoriano serving as a mere backdrop. The real star of Piazza Venezia was the balcony of the palace of the same name, from where Benito Mussolini delivered his speeches to the crowd. Nevertheless, the Vittoriano maintained a prominent role, which was linked to the presence of the tomb of the Unknown Soldier, to whom the regime often paid tribute. The Altar of the Fascist Fallen, which was located on the Capitoline Hill, also had a similar role.

Among the celebrations that took place at the Vittoriano during Fascism, those most related to the symbolism of the monument were the event that took place on May 24, 1935, which commemorated Italy's entry into the war 20 years earlier, and the one on November 9, 1938, which celebrated the 20th anniversary of Italy's victory in World War I.

Another noteworthy event that was organized at the Vittoriano was the one held on December 18, 1935, which was simultaneously replicated throughout Italy and was called “Oro alla Patria” due to the fact that it was aimed at collecting metals useful to the war cause; it was necessary because of the economic sanctions against Fascist Italy decreed by the League of Nations in response to Italy's attack on the Ethiopian Empire, which led to the war of the same name. Queen Elena, who donated the royal family's wedding rings in a ceremony officiated at the Altar of the Fatherland, delivered an official speech, an excerpt of which reads:

“[...] As we ascend the shrine of the Vittoriano united with the proud mothers and brides of our dear Italy to lay on the altar of the Unknown Hero the wedding ring, symbol of our first joys and extreme hardships, in the purest offering of dedication to the Fatherland bending to the ground almost to mingle in spirit with our glorious Fallen of the Great War, we invoke together with them, before God, ‘Victory’”

— Queen Elena's speech at the Vittoriano, Dec. 18, 1935

The speech was related to one of fascism's political messages: Victory redeemed by the fascist revolution and therefore no longer “mutilated.” Also from these years is the construction of the sacellum of the Unknown Soldier, that is, the crypt inside the Vittoriano made open to the public, which can thus be seen also on the other side of the tomb, the side that gives onto the inside of the building, and not only on the outside, the side that is at the Altar of the Fatherland.

== Oblivion ==
=== The return to the original symbolism ===
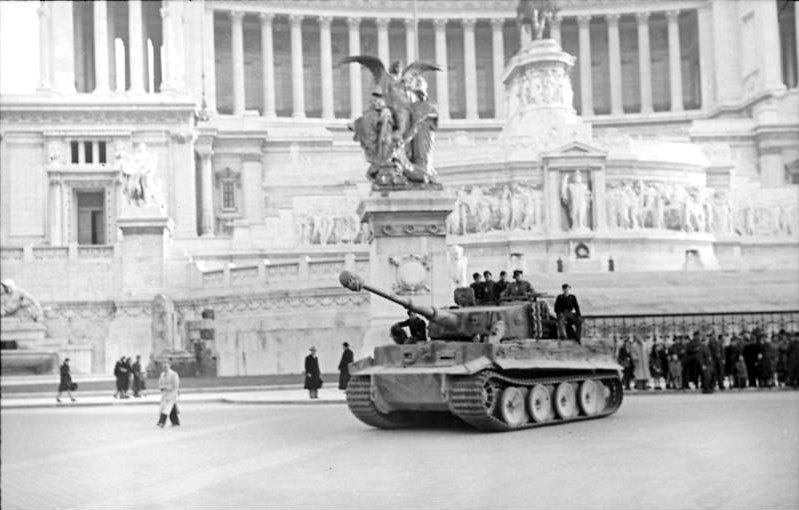
Nazi Germany's Panzer VI Tiger I heavy tank in front of the Vittoriano in February 1944, during the German occupation of Italy

With the fall of Fascism (July 25, 1943) Benito Mussolini was ousted from power and then arrested. King Victor Emmanuel III of Savoy then gave the task of forming a military government to Pietro Badoglio. In the following days the new executive began making contacts with the Allies to negotiate the surrender. A few weeks later, on September 3, the Badoglio government signed with the Allies the Armistice of Cassibile, which was announced on September 8, 1943 by Badoglio himself, by which Italy announced its surrender to the Anglo-American troops.

Also taking advantage of the disorientation of the troop units and the disintegration of the Italian leadership structures after the armistice of September 8, the Wehrmacht invaded Italy, overwhelming most of the armed forces of the former ally between September 8 and 19, 1943, capturing hundreds of thousands of soldiers who were largely interned in Germany as forced laborers, and seizing a substantial amount of weapons and equipment: the Italian Social Republic was founded on the part of the Peninsula occupied by the Germans, headed by Benito Mussolini, who had meanwhile been liberated by the Nazis with Operation Oak.

With the end of World War II (Sept. 2, 1945), from which resulted the referendum of June 2, 1946 and the birth of the Italian Republic, the Vittoriano, emptied of the military content that was associated with it by Fascism, returned to its previous function: a secular temple metaphorically dedicated to free and united Italy and celebrating sacrifice for the homeland and the ideals connected with it.

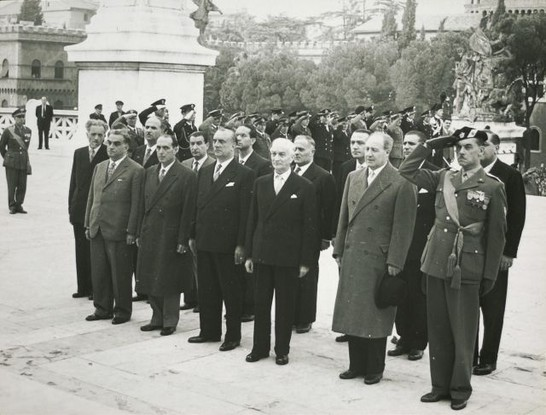
Prime Minister Antonio Segni pays homage to the Unknown Soldier (November 4, 1955)

From this time on, the Altar of the Fatherland once again became the scene of symbolic events representing the entire Italian people. The most important ones are held annually on the Anniversary of the Liberation of Italy (April 25), Italian Republic Day (June 2) and National Unity and Armed Forces Day (November 4), during which the President of the Italian Republic and the highest offices of state pay homage to the shrine of the Unknown Soldier with the laying of a laurel wreath in memory of the fallen and missing Italians in the wars.

As early as 1947 there were early indications of the biased use that some Italian political forces made of the Vittoriano and the Unknown Soldier. The first instrumental use of the monument was the deposition, on February 11, 1947, of a laurel wreath on the tomb of the Unknown Soldier and the concomitant organization of a general strike, during which incidents were recorded in Piazza Venezia between opposing political factions. The pretext was the signing of the Treaty of Paris, which took place the day before, on February 10, through which the borders of Europe were redrawn, including the Italian borders, and the reparations that defeated nations would have to pay to victorious ones after the events related to World War II were established.

In 1948 the political confrontation was much more heated, as the first free elections after the fall of fascism were scheduled for April 18. In this case the involvement of the Vittoriano was much more direct: in Piazza Venezia, right in front of the monument, a fifteen-meter high election propaganda billboard was installed by the Christian Democracy showing the Vittoriano “kicking” from behind a Red Army soldier, recognizable by the presence of the most famous symbols of communism, the hammer and sickle and the red star, having the features of King Kong. Above this scene stood a conspicuous “NO!”.

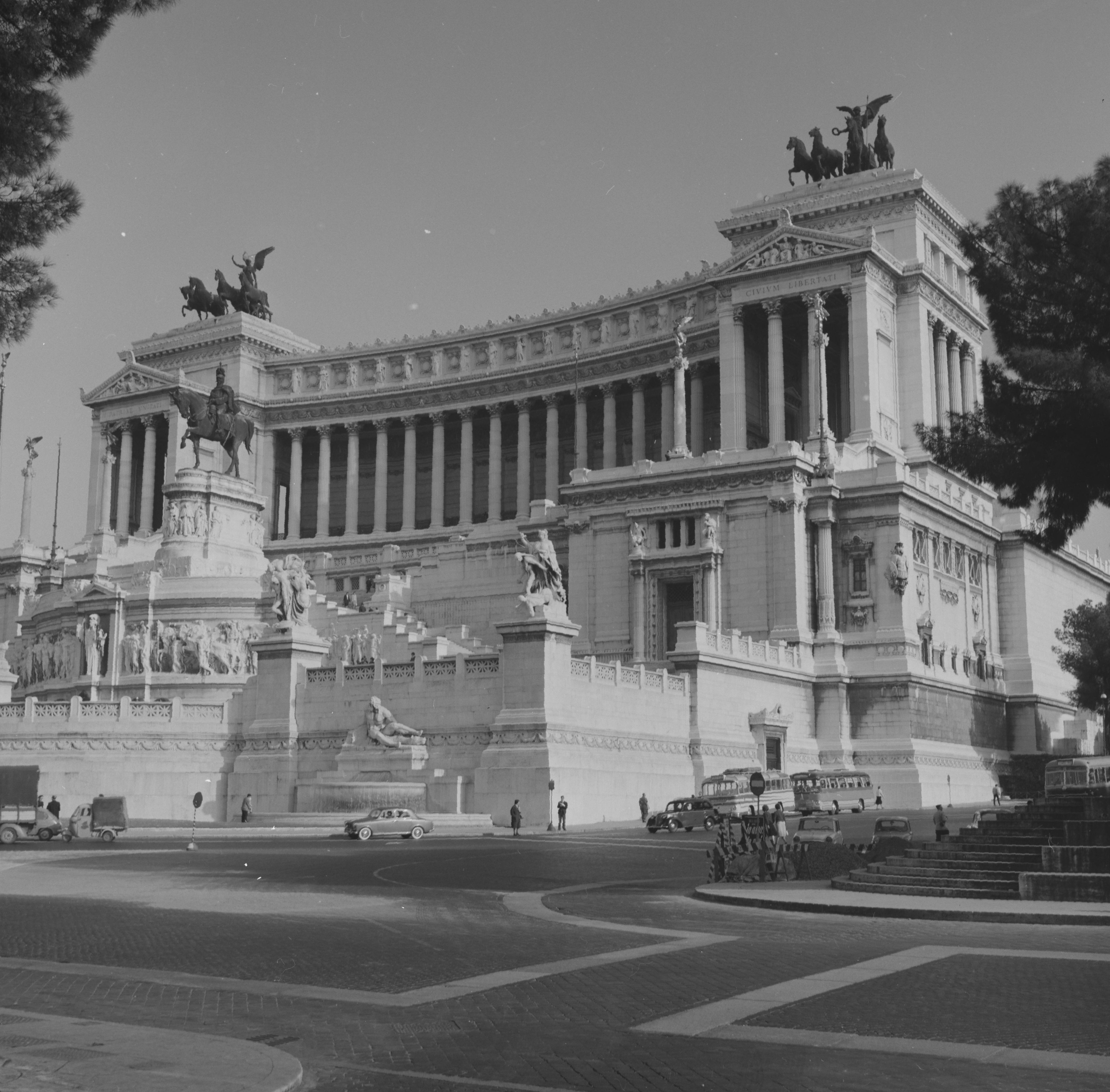
The Vittoriano in the mid-20th century

This sharply contrasting political climate was partly diluted as the years went by. In 1955, the first tenth anniversary of the Liberation, the President of the Italian Republic for the first time laid a laurel wreath in tribute to the Unknown Soldier during the April 25 celebrations. Previously, the program of the celebration included other events that did not include the solemn act of homage to the soldier symbolizing all Italians who fell in the wars. Beginning on April 25, 1955, the laying of a laurel wreath at the shrine of the Unknown Soldier became part of the official program of the event.

The solemn tribute on April 25, 1955 was not without controversy. Alongside the delegations of the ANPI, FIAP and FIVL, i.e., the Communist, Actionist and Catholic partisan associations, who attended the Altar of the Fatherland together with the President of the Republic, there were street protests by right-wing and extreme right-wing youth of the Italian Social Movement.

On February 23, 1958, on the tenth anniversary of the entry into force of the Republican Constitution, there was the solemn transfer to the Vittoriano of the flag of the command of the Volunteer Corps of Freedom, that is, the general coordinating structure of the Italian Resistance during World War II, officially recognized by both the Allies and the Badoglio government. This flag was added to the war flags of the disbanded regiments of the army that had been stored in the Vittoriano since 1935 pending the inauguration of a Flag Memorial open to the public.

On June 14, 1961, the shrine was enriched by Navy flags and some memorabilia related to Italian naval military history. Overall, the Flag Memorial was inaugurated and opened to the public on November 4, 1968, on the occasion of National Unity and Armed Forces Day. In this context, the Central Museum of the Risorgimento at the Vittoriano was inaugurated and opened to the public on October 2, 1970: the occasion was the commemoration of the centenary of the plebiscite that decreed the annexation of Lazio to the Kingdom of Italy.

=== Decline and closure ===
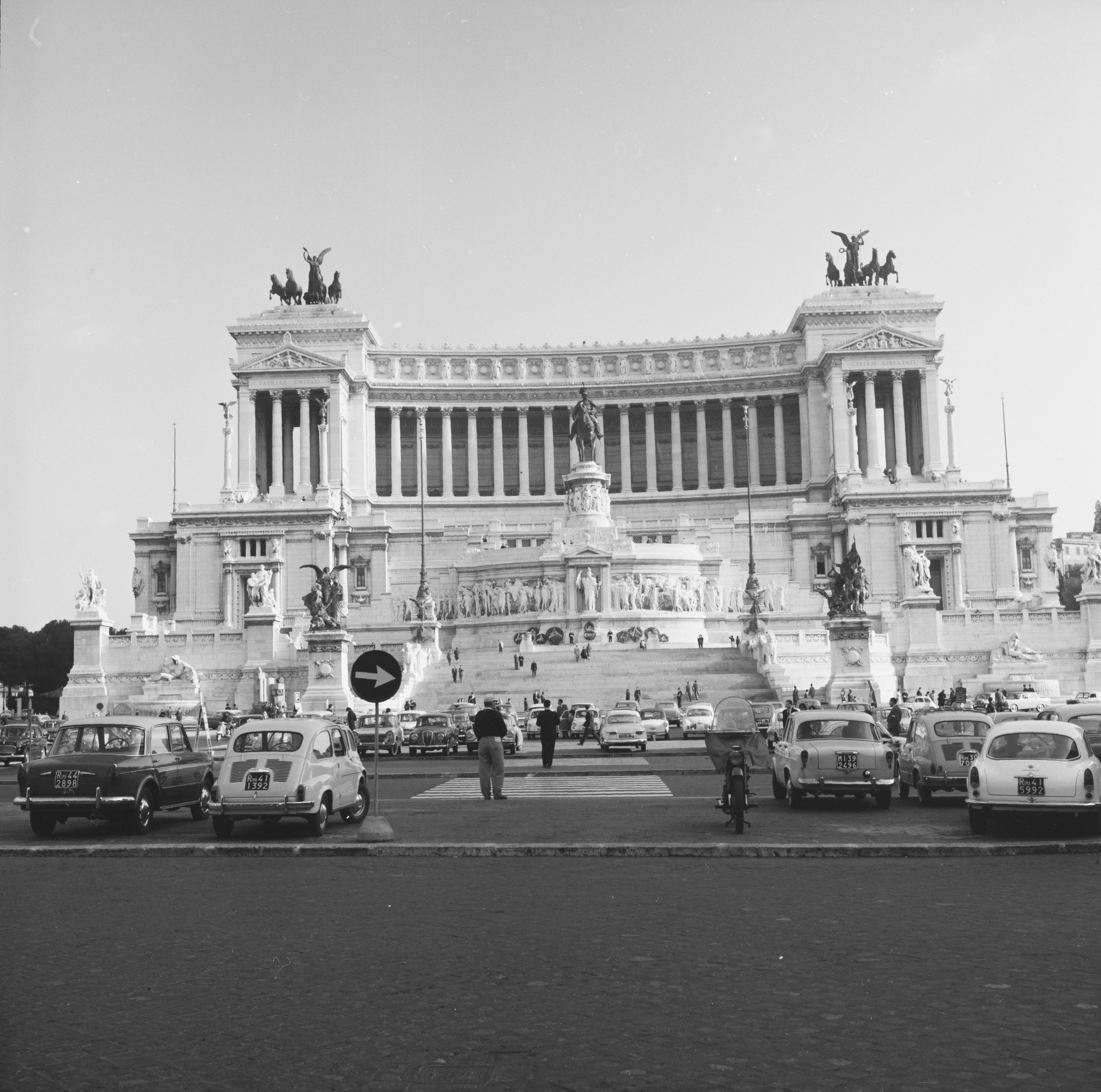
The Vittoriano in the mid-20th century

In the 1960s a slow disinterest on the part of Italians began for the Vittoriano. It was no longer considered one of the symbols of national identity, but began to be seen as an unwieldy monument representing an Italy outdated by history. As a result of the increasingly evident state of neglect, increasingly fewer people attended the celebrations taking place at the Vittoriano, including those involving the Unknown Soldier. From many quarters it was even proposed to either abolish them or move them elsewhere. The memory of the Fascist gatherings in Piazza Venezia was still alive, and the Vittoriano, which was its backdrop, gradually slipped into a damnatio memoriae that caused its progressive exclusion from the collective imagination of Italians.

Added to this was the memory of the demolitions and gutting of entire historic blocks of Rome, both in the years of the Vittoriano's construction and during the Fascist twenty-year period, which left a nostalgic memory. On the part of the institutions, too, there was a shift: from engaging and exciting events to increasingly smaller commemorations. The Vittoriano thus became a simple building in Rome emptied of all its symbolism with Piazza Venezia becoming, due to the urban expansion of Rome that took place in the 1950s and the consequent increase in vehicular traffic, a simple focal point of the capital's road system.

On December 12, 1969, the Vittoriano was hit by a bomb attack: two bombs were detonated in the afternoon, which caused no casualties and exploded around 5:30 p.m., ten minutes apart, coinciding with the Piazza Fontana massacre in Milan. They were placed sideways, at each propylaeum. One managed to unhinge the door of the Central Museum of the Risorgimento, which flew seven meters, and to break the stained glass windows of the basilica of Santa Maria in Aracoeli, while the other device made the base of a flagpole unsafe. Due to the damage from the bombing, the Vittoriano was closed to the public, and remained so for forty years.

In the wake of the political climate of the 1970s and due to its closure to the public, the Vittoriano experienced a long period of oblivion by both institutions and citizens. In 1975 it passed into the charge of the Ministry of Education to the newly formed Ministry of Cultural Heritage, a department to which it still belongs. In 1981, through a decree dated May 20, the ministry declared the Vittoriano's historical and artistic importance, linking it back to the previous Law No. 1089 of June 1, 1939.

=== The proposed “ruinization” ===
In the 1970s and 1980s, the Vittoriano began to raise controversy among art critics, who saw the building as an anachronistic and unsuccessful attempt to bring the classicism of the imperial age back to Rome; on the other hand, as early as 1913, Giovanni Papini called it “Vespasian of luxury,” while in 1931, at an event, the Futurists irreverently called it a “urinal.” Journalists and writers controversially dubbed the monument a “wedding cake” and a “typewriter.”

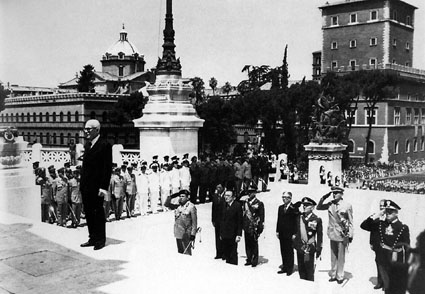
President of the Republic Sandro Pertini pays tribute to the Unknown Soldier

At the end of the 1980s an opinion movement arose that wanted its “ruinization,” that is, its complete abandonment to itself which would be followed by a phase of partial dismantling, with the removal of the most important artistic works, which would be musealized, and the conversion of the monument to a mere elevated promenade site with the demolition of its most imposing and symbolic parts, such as part of the upper portico and propylaea. In this way, the Vittoriano would no longer stand out in the eyes of visitors and would have a monumentality comparable to that of the surrounding buildings. More generally, the Vittoriano is rich in allegorical meanings that according to its makers had to be clear and unambiguous. This goal was not achieved, however, as throughout its history the Vittoriano has often had ambiguous interpretations. It was used as a symbol by two very different ruling classes, including in the way they conveyed their political messages: liberal and fascist Italy.

The inherent ambivalence of the Vittoriano is perhaps to be found in the Risorgimento, which was characterized by a dual nature: on the one hand the patriots, on the other hand the silent majority consisting mainly of peasants and the middle class who were indifferent to the Italian unification process. The irreverent nicknames that were given to the Vittoriano derive precisely from this aspect: since not all Italians were involved in the wars of the Risorgimento, part of the population did not have that deference to the Vittoriano that was typical of the patriots.

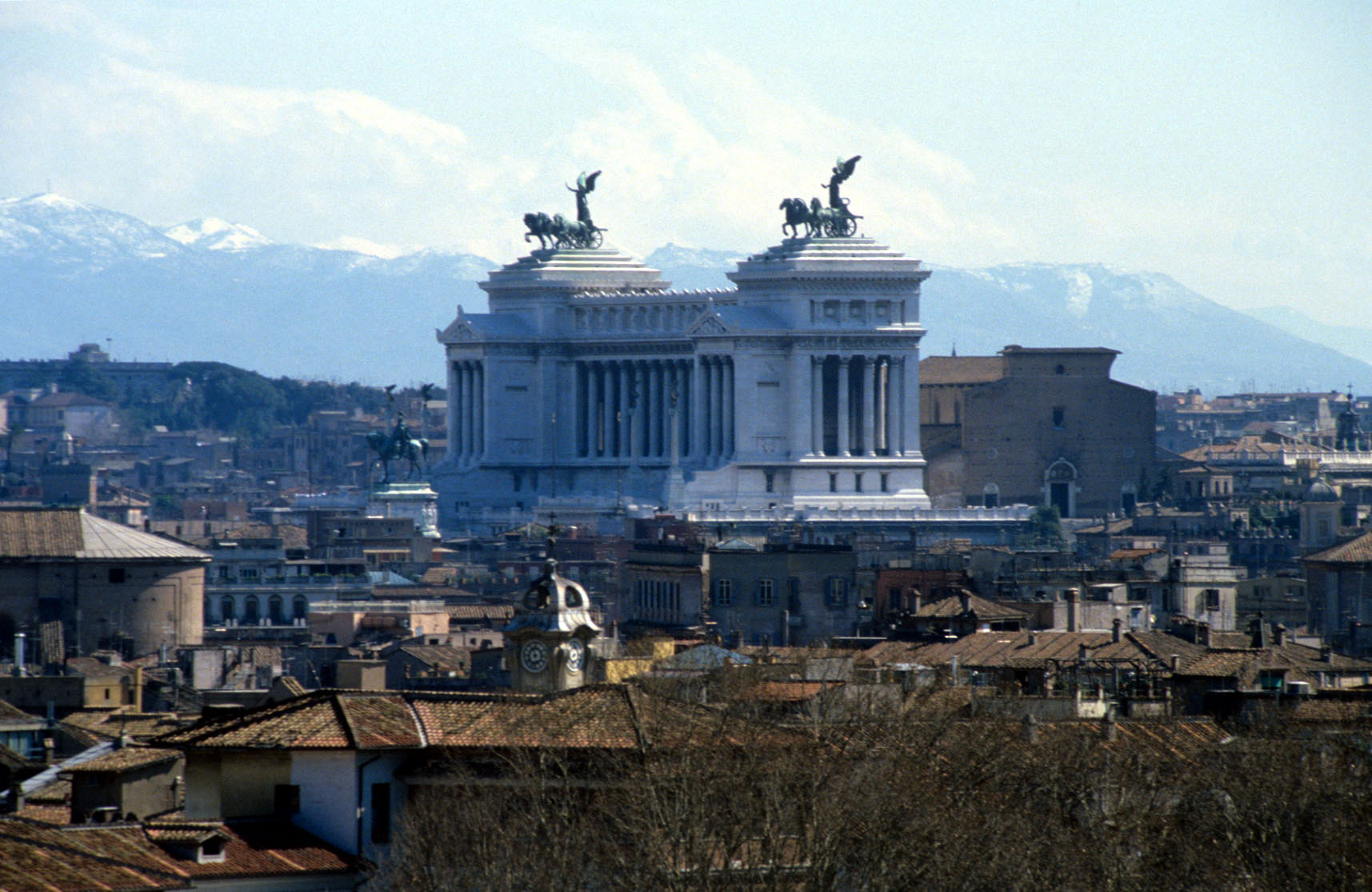
The Vittoriano stands out on the landscape of Rome in a 1988 photo

Added to this was the initial hostility of the Papacy, which originated from the Roman Question, that is, the capture of Rome and the consequent relegation of the pope to the Apostolic Palaces, which was resolved after a few decades through the signing of the Lateran Pacts (Feb. 11, 1929). Even the patriots were not united: from the beginning they were divided into federalists and centralists, monarchists and republicans, etc.

In addition, there was sharp criticism of the choice made by the royal commission during the second competition to demolish the medieval buildings, including monumental ones, that stood on the Capitoline Hill in order to erect the new monument in a highly symbolic place. They also criticized the choice of using Botticino marble (which was not Sacconi's idea, however), considered too light in color compared to other monuments in Rome. Those who wanted the ruinization of the Vittoriano proposed partly restoring the ancient road system of Piazza Venezia, rebuilding, among other things, Palazzo Torlonia and modifying the ancient alignments of the streets with respect to Via del Corso.

For those who thought of its ruinization, it would have been better to relocate the Tomb of the Unknown Soldier elsewhere, for example within the Parco della Rimembranza in the Parioli district. This green area was highly symbolic: it was created in 1923 on the basis of a provision of the undersecretary of public education Mario Lupi, who arranged for the creation, throughout Italy, of parks or tree-lined avenues along which there was a number of trees at least equal to the number of fallen and missing in the municipal community. Each of these trees was characterized by the presence of a plaque bearing the name of a fallen or missing person from World War I.

== Revival ==
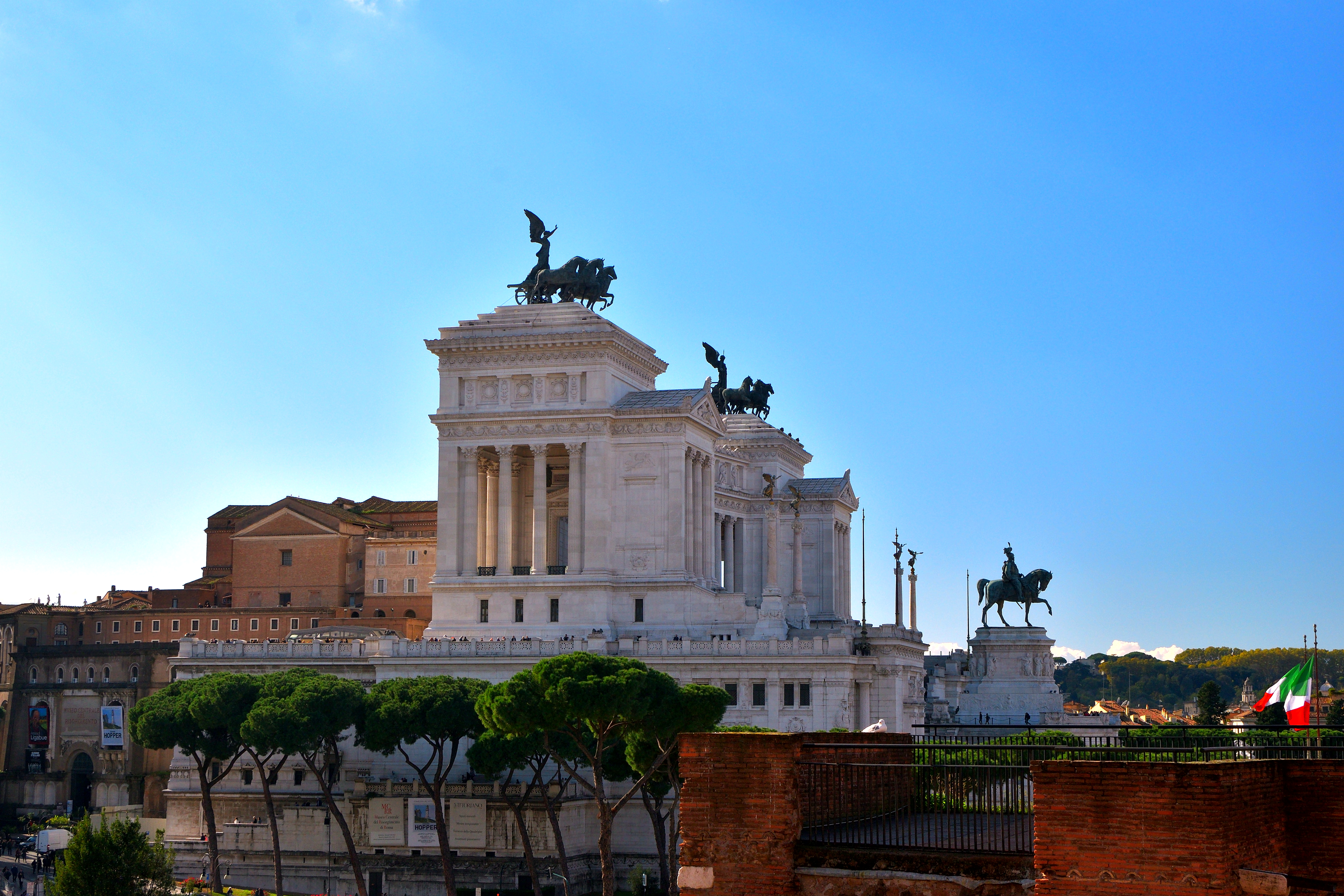
Side view of the Vittoriano

It was the President of the Italian Republic Carlo Azeglio Ciampi, at the beginning of the 21st century, who began a work of revival and enhancement of Italian patriotic symbols, including the Vittoriano. Through Ciampi's initiative, the Vittoriano regained the symbolic importance it once had. Ciampi's work was also taken up and continued by his successor, Giorgio Napolitano, with particular prominence during the celebrations of the 150th anniversary of the Unification of Italy.

Specifically, the monument was made accessible to the public again through the will of Carlo Azeglio Ciampi, after careful restoration, on September 24, 2000, on the occasion of the opening ceremony of the 2000-2001 school year, the most important part of which took place precisely at the Vittoriano in the presence of the President of the Italian Republic. The Vittoriano was then officially opened to the public the following November 4, on the occasion of the commemoration of National Unity and Armed Forces Day. Ciampi proposed it as a new forum of Rome, the “forum of the Republic.” On that occasion Ciampi said:

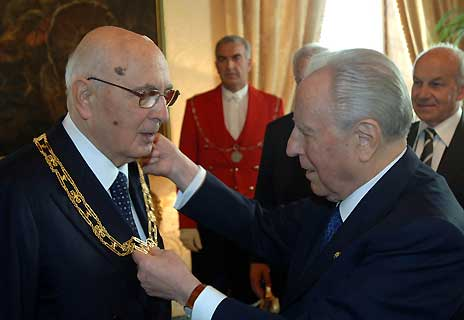
Giorgio Napolitano receives from President of the Republic Carlo Azeglio Ciampi the insignia of knight of the grand cross decorated with grand cordon (May 15, 2006)

“[...] this extraordinary terrace of Rome, of our capital, on a monument that is becoming one of the central points of every Italian's encounter with the eternal city. [...]”

— Carlo Azeglio Ciampi

From November 4, 2000 onward, the symbolically most important ceremonies of the Anniversary of the Liberation of Italy (April 25), Italian Republic Day (June 2) and National Unity and Armed Forces Day (November 4) have been taking place permanently at the Vittoriano. The Vittoriano has also become an important museum venue for collections pertaining to Italian national identity: the present exhibition spaces (the Central Museum of the Risorgimento and the Flag Memorial) have been revitalised with upgrades that have made them increasingly popular with tourists.

In 2002, after another series of restoration works, new locations of the Vittoriano were opened to the public. Some of these interventions were also carried out with part of the revenue from the lottery, according to the provisions of Law No. 662 of December 23, 1996.

On the occasion of the opening ceremony of the 2003-2004 school year, which again took place at the Vittoriano, the President of the Italian Republic, Carlo Azeglio Ciampi, said of the monument:

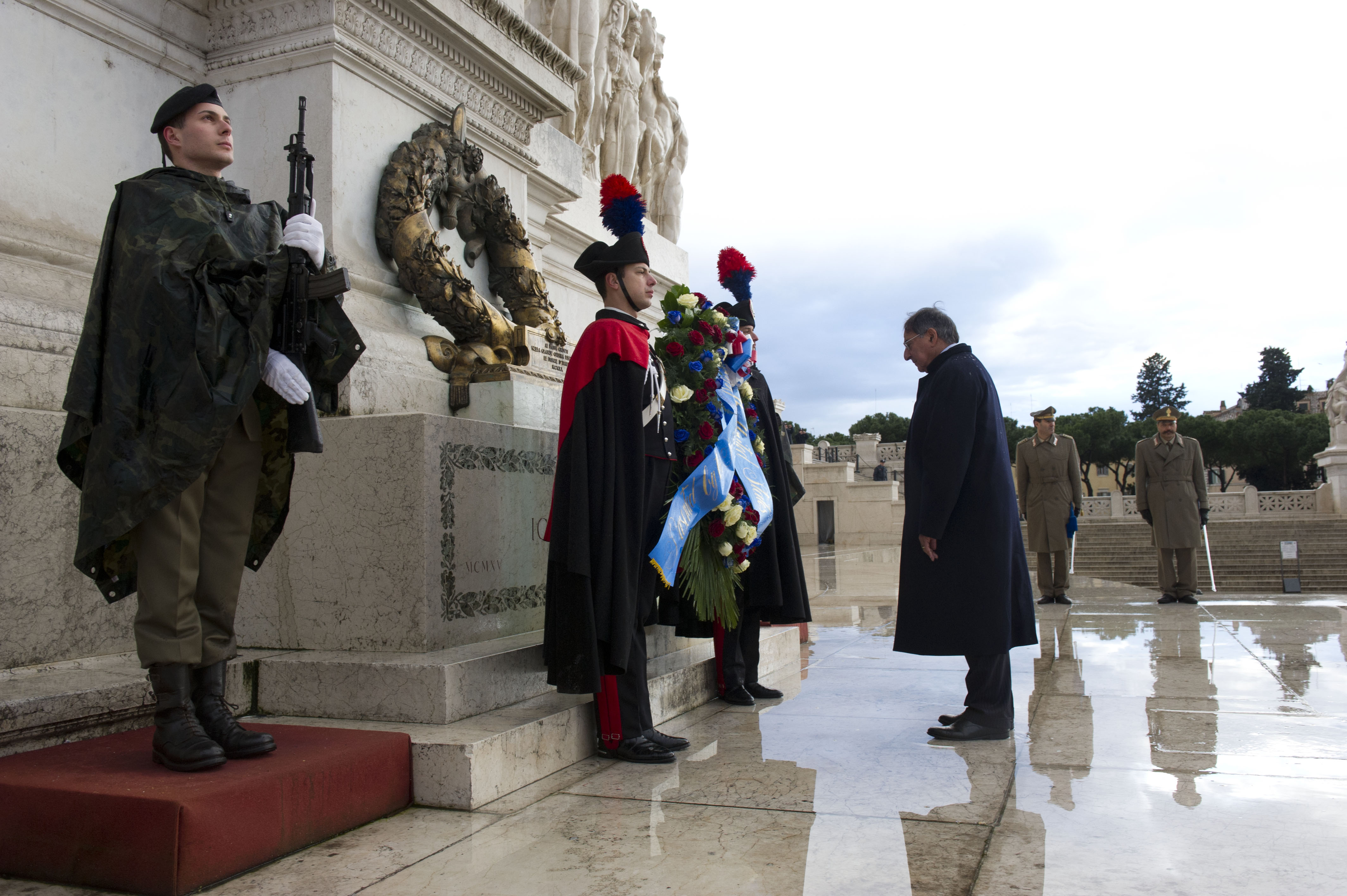
U.S. Secretary of Defense Leon Panetta pays tribute to the Unknown Soldier (Jan. 16, 2013)

“[...] This monument is experiencing a second youth. We are rediscovering it as a symbol of the legacy of values that the generations of the Risorgimento entrusted to us. The foundations of these values are engraved here in marble: the unity of the homeland, the freedom of citizens. [...]”

— Carlo Azeglio Ciampi

Carlo Azeglio Ciampi, referring to the presence, among the works of art in the Vittoriano, of statues of Italian cities and regions stated:

“[...] If we look up there, above the colonnade, we see the sixteen statues of the regions of Italy, as many as there were a century ago. Here next to us, in the base of the statue of Victor Emmanuel II, are depicted the cities of Italy that were capitals and the ancient maritime republics. Those who wanted this monument dedicated it to the whole of Italy, because Italy is made up of its hundred cities, its regions, its provinces, its municipalities. [...]”

— Carlo Azeglio Ciampi

The Vittoriano is seen by some art critics as an important step in the search for a national style of the newly constituted Kingdom of Italy. The Vittoriano is an example of the art of the first period of national unity, a fusion of eclecticism and neoclassicism, both in itself and in the numerous works of art it houses.

This revitalization of the Vittoriano has gone hand in hand with the constant and increasing work of enhancing other Italian patriotic symbols. The Vittoriano is owned by the Ministry of Cultural Heritage, which, since February 1, 2005, has managed it through the Regional Directorate for Cultural and Landscape Heritage of Lazio, later the Regional Directorate of Museums of Lazio. In 2020, the monument was united with the nearby National Museum of Palazzo Venezia within a single administration, creating a new entity with special autonomy.

== See also ==
- Ettore Ferrari
- Giuseppe Sacconi
- Tomb of the Unknown Soldier (Italy)
- Pio Piacentini
- National symbols of Italy
- Victor Emmanuel II Monument
- Victor Emmanuel II

== Bibliography ==
- John Agnew (2005). The Impossible Capital: Monumental Rome under Liberal and Fascist Regimes, 1870-1943. Wiley Blackwell.
- Maria Rosaria Coppola, Adriano Morabito e Marco Placidi (2005). Il Vittoriano nascosto. Ministero per i beni e le attività culturali.
- Spiro Kostof (1973). The Third Rome 1870—1950: an Introduction.
- Levi, Primo (April 1904). "Il monumento dell'Unità Italiana". La Lettura. fascicolo IV. Corriere della Sera.
- Pier Luigi Porzio, ed. (1986). Il Vittoriano, Materiali per una storia. I. Palombi.
- Pier Luigi Porzio, ed. (1988). Il Vittoriano, Materiali per una storia. II. Palombi.
- Mariano, Fabio Mariano (2004). L'età dell'Eclettismo. Nerbini.
- Mola, Aldo Alessandro (2002). Storia della monarchia in Italia. Bompiani.
- Maurizio Ridolfi, ed. (2003). Almanacco della Repubblica: storia d'Italia attraverso le tradizioni, le istituzioni e le simbologie repubblicane. Bruno Mondadori. ISBN 978-88-424-9499-7.
- Tobia, Bruno (2011). L'Altare della Patria. Il Mulino.
- Romano Ugolini, ed. (2011). Cento anni del Vittoriano 1911-2011. Atti della Giornata di studi. Gangemi Editore Spa. ISBN 978-88-492-7422-6.
