= Department of Civil Liberties and Immigration (Italy) =

Department for Civil Liberties and Immigration

Agency overview
- Jurisdiction: Government of Italy
- Agency executives: Luciana Lamorgese, Minister of Interior
- Parent department: Ministry of Interior (Italy)
- Website: http://www.interno.gov.it/

The Department for Civil Liberties and Immigration (Italian: Dipartimento per le Libertà civili e l'Immigrazione) is a department of the Italian Ministry of Interior, with its headquarters in Rome, where the main Ministry of Interior offices are located, at the Palazzo del Viminale. The minister responsible is Luciana Lamorgese.

== Organisation ==
The offices, divisions, and departments of the Department of Civil Liberties and Immigration are as follows:

- Central Directorate for Immigration and Asylum Policy (Direzione centrale per le politiche dell'Immigrazione e dell'Asilo)
- Central Directorate for Civil Services concerning Immigration and Asylum (Direzione centrale dei Servizi civili per l'Immigrazione e l'Asilo)
- Central Office for Civil Rights, Citizenship, and Minorities (Direzione centrale per i Diritti civili, la Cittadinanza e le Minoranze)
- Central Directorate of Religious Affairs (Direzione centrale degli Affari dei culti)
- Central Directorate for the Administration of Places of Worship Fund (Direzione centrale per l'amministrazione del Fondo edifici di culto)
