= Fountain in Piazza del Viminale =

Fountain in Rome, Italy

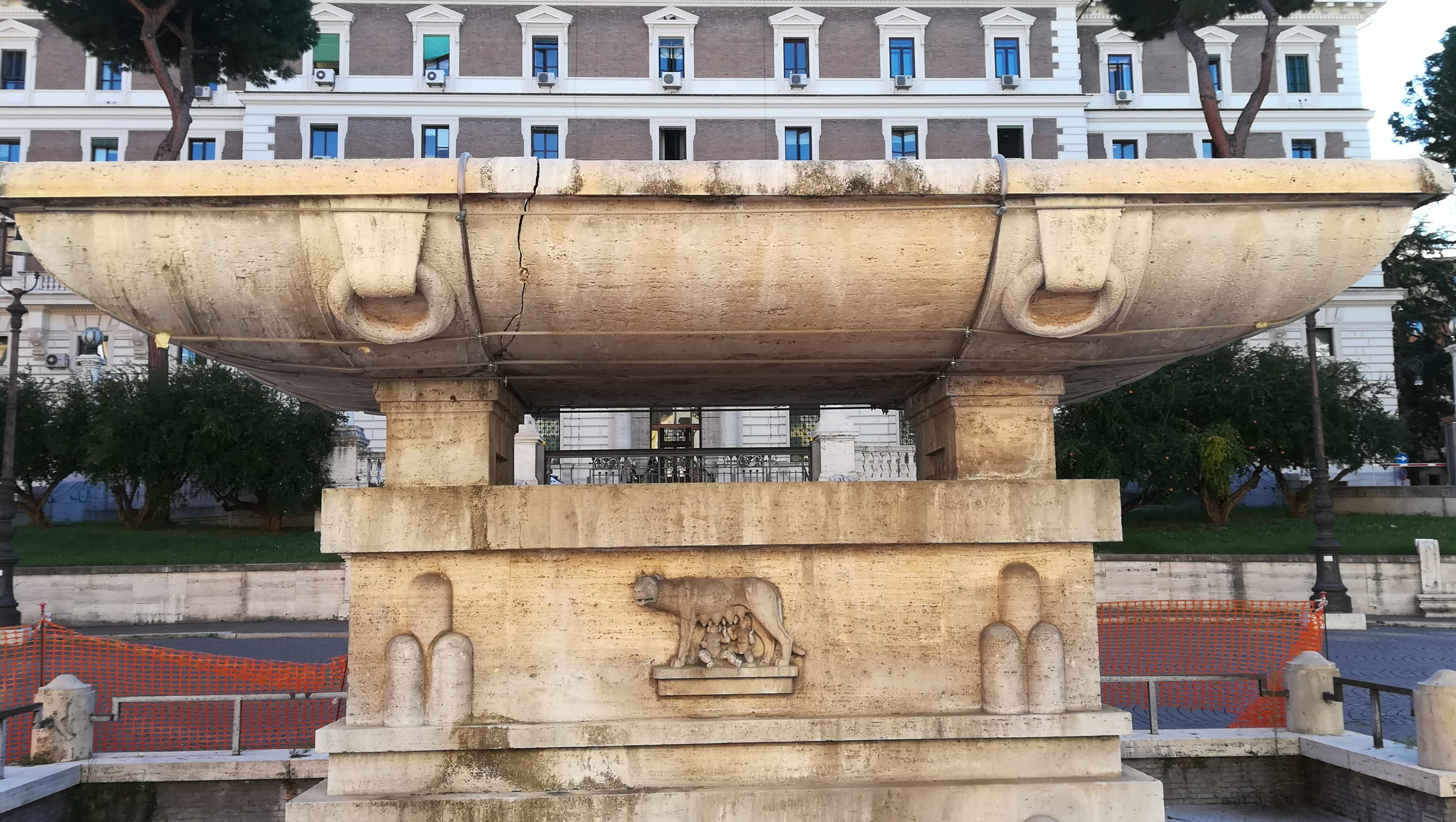
- The fountain in 2018
- Location: Rome, Italy

The fountain in Piazza del Viminale is in Rome, Italy. It is installed outside the Palazzo del Viminale.

== See also ==
- List of fountains in Rome
