= Polizia Stradale =

National highway patrol of Italy

The Polizia Stradale is the national highway patrol of Italy and is a sub-directorate of the Italian State Police.

The Polizia Stradale patrols the 7,000 kilometres of motorways (autostrada) in Italy and the main highways and arterial roads outside towns. Missions include the prevention and detection of driving offences, traffic accident reporting, planning and carrying out services to regulate traffic, providing escorts for road safety, protecting and controlling the road network, rescue operations and cooperation in the collection of traffic flow data.

Between the several activities, it carries out also services of supply and regulation of the traffic. Under the profile of the communication verification the news on the practicability then comes diffuse from the Center coordination information on street emergency (Centro Addestramento Polizia di Stato) (C.C.I.S.S.). It also promotes the initiatives and campaigns of sensibilities of the citizens, in particular young people, on street emergencies.

== History ==
During the reconstruction after World War II the number of automobiles on the roads began to increase. In order to respond to the increasing requirements of this traffic, highway patrol sections were formed at 72 police headquarters with the employment of 2600 men and numerous motorcycles of various origins, mostly military surplus, in the first months of 1946.

The PS was established by a decree issued on 26 November 1947 signed by the former Temporary Head of the State, Enrico De Nicola. He established the tasks of the service and its organization, attributing some of the management not to the Ministry of the Public Works but to the Interior.

Subsequently the Polizia Stradale was organized into departments with regional responsibility and sections with local competence with subordinate sub-sections and detachments. The necessity of centralized control has increased with the passing of the years.

== Organization ==
The PS is managed by the Central Directorate for Police, Railway, and Communications and the Special Police Departments of State Police, a part of Department of Public Security at the Ministry of the Interior.

The Traffic Police is divided into:

- Compartments: in all the regional capitals except for:
  - Aosta, which is part of the compartment Piedmont, while Molise refers to the compartment Campania.
  - In Sicily were established in eastern Sicily compartments Catania and western Sicily to Palermo.
  - The compartment Veneto for geographical reasons is based in Padua.
- Sections: in all provincial capitals.
- Detachments: 187 in all, are located near major towns.
- Highway Operating Centers (COA): 14 in all activities and coordination of patrols ensure that the motorways.
- Sections: 81 in all, built in agreement with the company or highways with the Azienda Nazionale Autonoma delle Strade (ANAS).
- 12,000 persons.

== Equipment ==
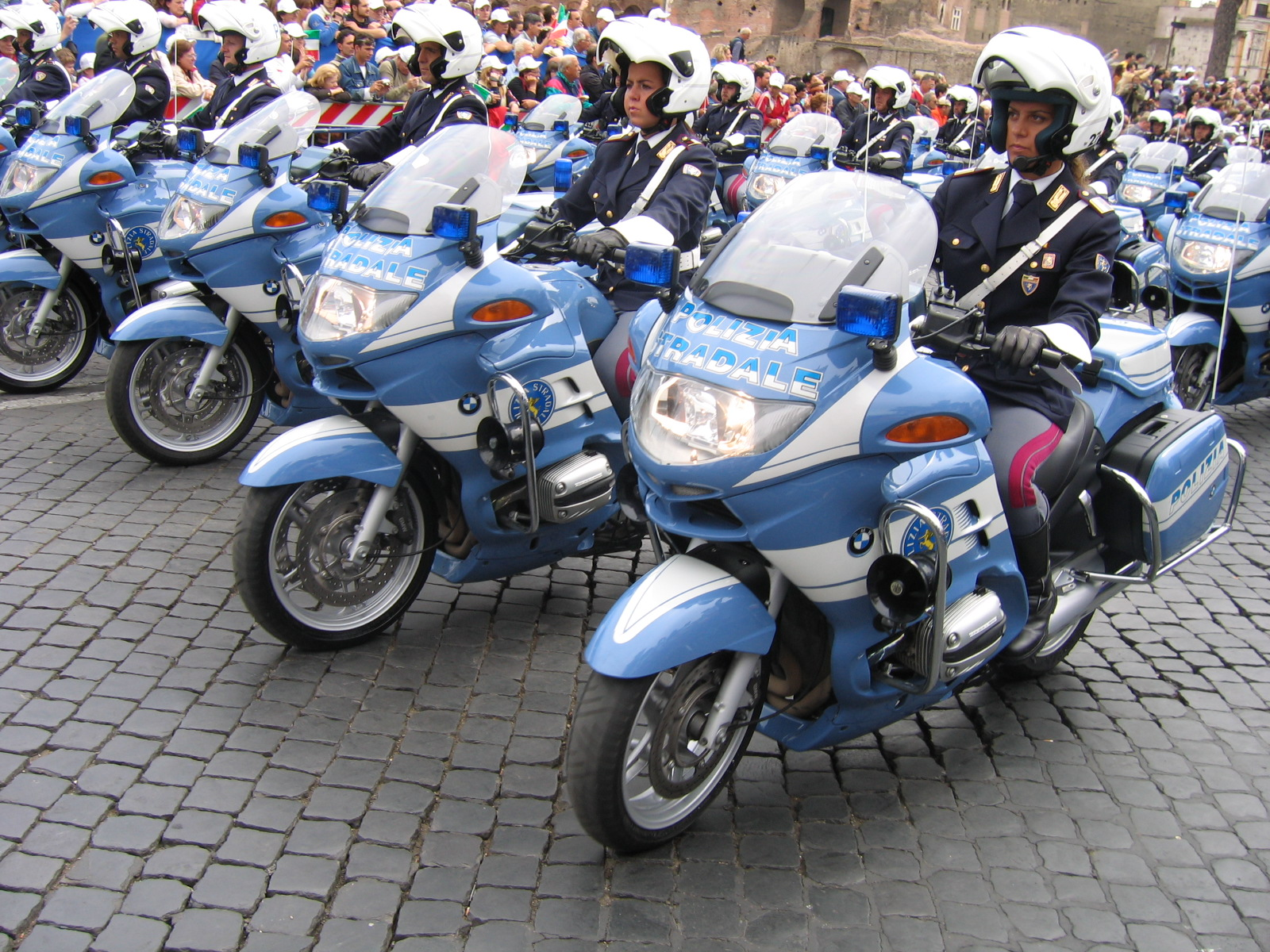
Polizia Stradale BMW 850's

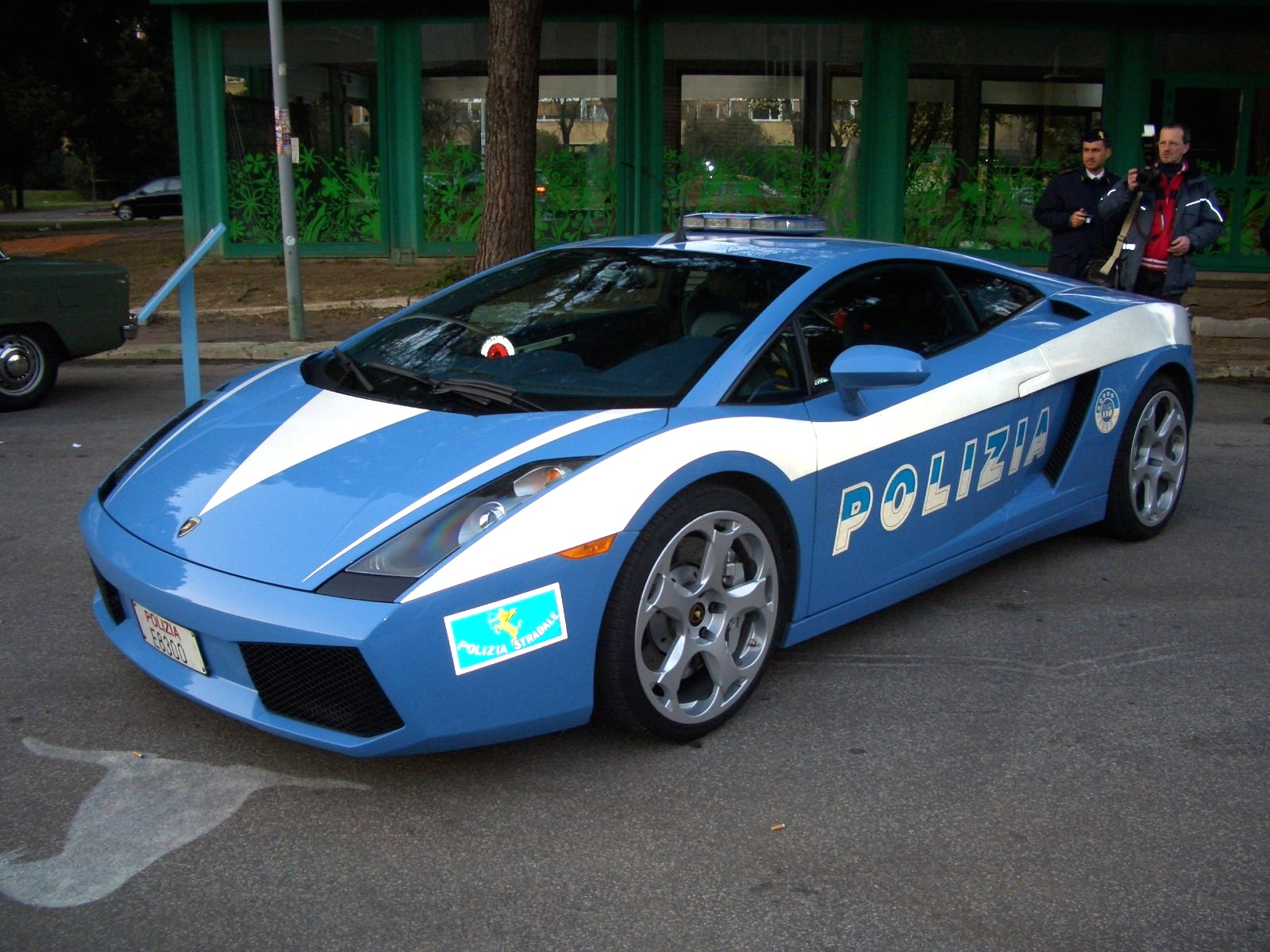
Lamborghini Gallardo

The PS uses high-powered cars and motorcycles with some van and other specialised vehicles as needed.

=== Cars ===
- BMW 3 Series (E90)
- Volkswagen Passat
- Alfa Romeo 159
- Alfa Romeo Giulia Veloce
- Alfa Romeo Giulietta
- Audi A4
- BMW 330 Touring
- Jeep Renegade
- Volvo V50
- Subaru Legacy
- Impreza (police car without livery)
- Renault Laguna Grandtour
- Renault Laguna
- Lamborghini Gallardo and Lamborghini LP560-4 (both out of service)
- Lamborghini Huracán
- SEAT Alhambra

=== Motorcycles ===
- Aprilia Nuovo Pegaso
- BMW RT 850
- Moto Guzzi Falcone

=== Others ===
- Fiat Ducato 2

=== Sidearm ===
- Beretta 92 – 9mm (seen in officers holsters)

== See also ==
- Italian Police
