= Killing of Abanoub Youssef =

2026 fatal school stabbing in La Spezia, Italy

- Date: January 16, 2026
- Venue: Istituto Professionale Domenico Chiodo
- Location: La Spezia, Liguria, Italy
- Type: Stabbing
- Motive: Personal dispute (reported jealousy over childhood photographs)
- Target: Abanoub Youssef
- Deaths: 1

== Background ==
Abanoub Youssef (23 February 2007 – 16 January 2026), often referred to by his friends as "Aba," was an 18-year-old Egyptian-Italian student. Born in Faiyum, Egypt, he moved to Italy at the age of five and was an Italian citizen. A resident of La Spezia for over thirteen years, Youssef was a final-year student at the Domenico Chiodo technical institute and a prominent member of the local Coptic community.

== Incident ==
On 16 January 2026, at approximately 11:00 AM, a confrontation occurred between Youssef and a 19-year-old classmate, Zouhair Atif. According to reports, the dispute originated in a school restroom before escalating shortly afterward. As Youssef attempted to flee toward his classroom, he was stabbed in the hallway in the presence of students and faculty.

School staff provided immediate aid before emergency services arrived. Youssef was transported to Sant’Andrea Hospital, where he underwent emergency surgery for critical internal injuries. Despite medical efforts, he suffered several cardiac arrests and was pronounced dead later that evening.

== Investigation and motive ==
The suspect was disarmed at the scene and subsequently arrested by the Carabinieri. During interrogation, Atif reportedly admitted to the stabbing, claiming he was provoked by the victim exchanging childhood photographs with a female classmate the suspect was dating. Authorities noted that Youssef and the girl were long-time acquaintances.

The La Spezia Public Prosecutor's Office is investigating the case under the charge of aggravated voluntary murder (omicidio volontario aggravato). Investigators are evaluating the aggravating circumstance of premeditation, as the suspect allegedly brought the weapon from home. Atif remains in custody at San Giorgio Prison.

== Funeral and mourning ==
On 22 January 2026, a funeral service for Abanoub Youssef was held at the Cathedral of Christ the King in La Spezia, attended by thousands of family members, classmates, and residents. The procession began at the city morgue and moved toward the cathedral, where religious leaders from both the Coptic Orthodox and Catholic communities officiated the ceremony.

Many participants carried white flowers and banners reading "Aba Vive" ("Aba Lives"), and pallbearers carried Youssef's white coffin into the cathedral as a sign of respect. The service included prayers in Italian, Arabic, and Coptic. A day of civic mourning was declared by the Mayor of La Spezia, with schools and local institutions participating in commemorations. Following the service, the coffin was escorted to the Cemetery of Boschetti for burial.

== Reactions ==
- Political: Italian Interior Minister Matteo Piantedosi and Education Minister Giuseppe Valditara expressed condolences and called for enhanced school safety measures. Valditara proposed the potential installation of metal detectors in certain high-risk educational institutions.
- Public: On 22 January 2026, thousands attended Youssef's funeral at the Cathedral of Christ the King. A silent march was also organized by students and residents in La Spezia to honor his memory and protest against youth violence.
