= Polizia di Stato =

National police force in Italy

State Police Polizia di Stato
- Coat of Arms

- Flag
- Common name: Polizia
- Abbreviation: P.S.
- Motto: Sub lege libertas "Freedom under the law"

Agency overview
- Formed: 11 July 1852
- Employees: 107,000 (2019)
- Annual budget: €6.6 billion (2019)

Jurisdictional structure
- National agency: Italy
- Operations jurisdiction: Italy
- General nature: Civilian police

Operational structure
- Overseen by Department: Ministry of the Interior
- Headquarters: Rome, Viminal Palace
- Sworn members: 104,000+
- Civilians: 6,000+
- Agency executive: Vittorio Pisani, Chief of the Police, Prefect
- Child agencies: Polizia Stradale; Polizia Ferroviaria; Polizia Postale e delle Comunicazioni; Polizia di Frontiera

Website
- poliziadistato.it

The Polizia di Stato (State Police or P.S.) is one of the national police forces of Italy. Alongside the Carabinieri, it is the main police force for providing police duties, primarily to cities and large towns, and with its child agencies it is also responsible for highway patrol (autostrade), railways (ferrovie), airports (aeroporti), customs (together with the Guardia di Finanza), as well as certain waterways, and assisting the local police forces.

It was a military force until 1981 when the Italian State Law 121 was enacted. This converted the State Police to a civil force, which is in contrast to the other main police forces of Italy: the Arma dei Carabinieri, which is a military police (gendarmerie) force and the Guardia di Finanza, the Italian customs and border protection police that also falls in the military corps category.

The Polizia di Stato is the principal Italian police force for the maintenance of public security and as such it is run directly by the Department of Public Security (Dipartimento della Pubblica Sicurezza), and the keeping of public order (ordine pubblico). Interpol summarizes the primary focus of this force: "Its responsibilities include investigative and law enforcement duties, and the security of motorway, railway, and waterway networks."

== History ==
While the modern Polizia di Stato was created in 1981 with the merger of the many civil police services of Italy, its roots date back to 1852 as the police force of the then Kingdom of Sardinia.

It is the successor and heir to the traditions of military and civil police organizations under both monarchy and republic.

=== Before unification ===
On 11 July 1852, the King of Sardinia Victor Emmanuel II established the Public Security Guards, a prototype city police service created to serve Turin and Genoa for the protection of their citizens (Law no.1404), and also formed detachments of municipal police. This date is marked as the official anniversary of the State Police.

At that time there were a number of provincial National Guard and Municipal Militia battalions, plus cavalry platoons detached from the army and Carabinieri.

=== Unified Italy ===
In 1859, given the current situation regarding the Unification of Italy, the Public Security Guards became the de facto national civil police of a unified Italian nation. Law 3570 (13 November 1859) officially introduced police inspectors into the growing force, and to ensure the security of the residents of a number of provincial capitals and other major cities, the questori, appointed by the leadership with Royal assent, were also introduced becoming the police chiefs of these areas.

On 9 October 1861, the General Directorate of Public Security of the Kingdom was formally established (Royal Decree 225) to serve as the central authority for civilian law enforcement.

== Mission ==
Europol (the EU's law enforcement agency), provides this summary of the force's responsibilities: "protecting the state, safeguarding the rights and freedoms of citizens, supervising the maintenance of public order, maintaining public safety, providing assistance to public entities and private in the event of accidents and disasters as well as the peaceful resolution of disputes between private individuals. It also deals with the training and education, at its facilities, of members of other police bodies ... speciality departments include the Traffic, Railway, Communications Police, the Mobile Departments and the Scientific Police."

== Strength ==
The State Police has an authorised strength by law of 115,000 people. However, there are approximately 110,000 people of which 16,000 are women. Just under 6,000 employees are civilian support personnel with technical skills who provide logistic and technical support. In 2005 the State Police contained 105,324 members as follows: 893 dirigenti (leaders/officers), 1,839 vice questori (Vice-Questors), 723 commissari capo (Chief Superintendents), 19,230 ispettori (Inspectors), 666 vice ispettori (Sub-inspectors), 13,677 sovrintendenti (Sergeants), 38,976 assistenti (Senior agents), and 29,320 agenti (Constables/Agents).

Approximately 1,500 officers are assigned to the "neighbourhood police" service, the Polizia di Quartiere, which has a police presence on the streets and deters crime. Pairs of poliziotti (policemen) patrol areas of major cities on foot.

== Organization ==
The headquarters of the Polizia di Stato are in Rome and its chief is referred to as the Capo della Polizia (Chief of the Police) with official Rank of Capo della Polizia – Direttore Generale della Pubblica Sicurezza (Chief of the Police – Director General of Public Security). The Chief of the State Police is also the Honorary President of the National Association of State Police (Associazione Nazionale della Polizia di Stato). Three vice chiefs/directors-general report to the chief and their main functions are:

- accomplishment of the functions
- planning and coordination activity
- Director of the Criminal Investigation Police

The force is organized on a regional and provincial basis. The territory of the Italian Republic is divided into 20 regions. They include 107 provincial commands—one each in the 14 metropolitan cities (città metropolitane), 80 provinces (province), 6 free municipal consortiums (liberi consorzi comunali, the formal provinces of Sicily), 4 abolished Friuli-Venezia Giulia provinces, 2 autonomous provinces—Bolzano – Alto Adige and Trento and 1 in Valle d'Aosta, which is an autonomous region with no provinces nor akin administrative subdivision at all. The administrative centre of each provincial command is the local headquarters, called Questura which is commanded by a Questore (that is also the highest State Police authority for the province – Autorità Provinciale di Pubblica Sicurezza – Provincial Authority of Public Security). The only exception is the recently created province of South Sardinia (established in and operational since 2016). The territory of each province is further divided into Public Security Offices (Commissariati di Pubblica Sicurezza), commanded by a Vice Questore Aggiunto or Commissario Capo (Chief Commissioner). The lowest public security authority is the police station or precinct (Stazione di polizia).

=== Headquarters organization ===
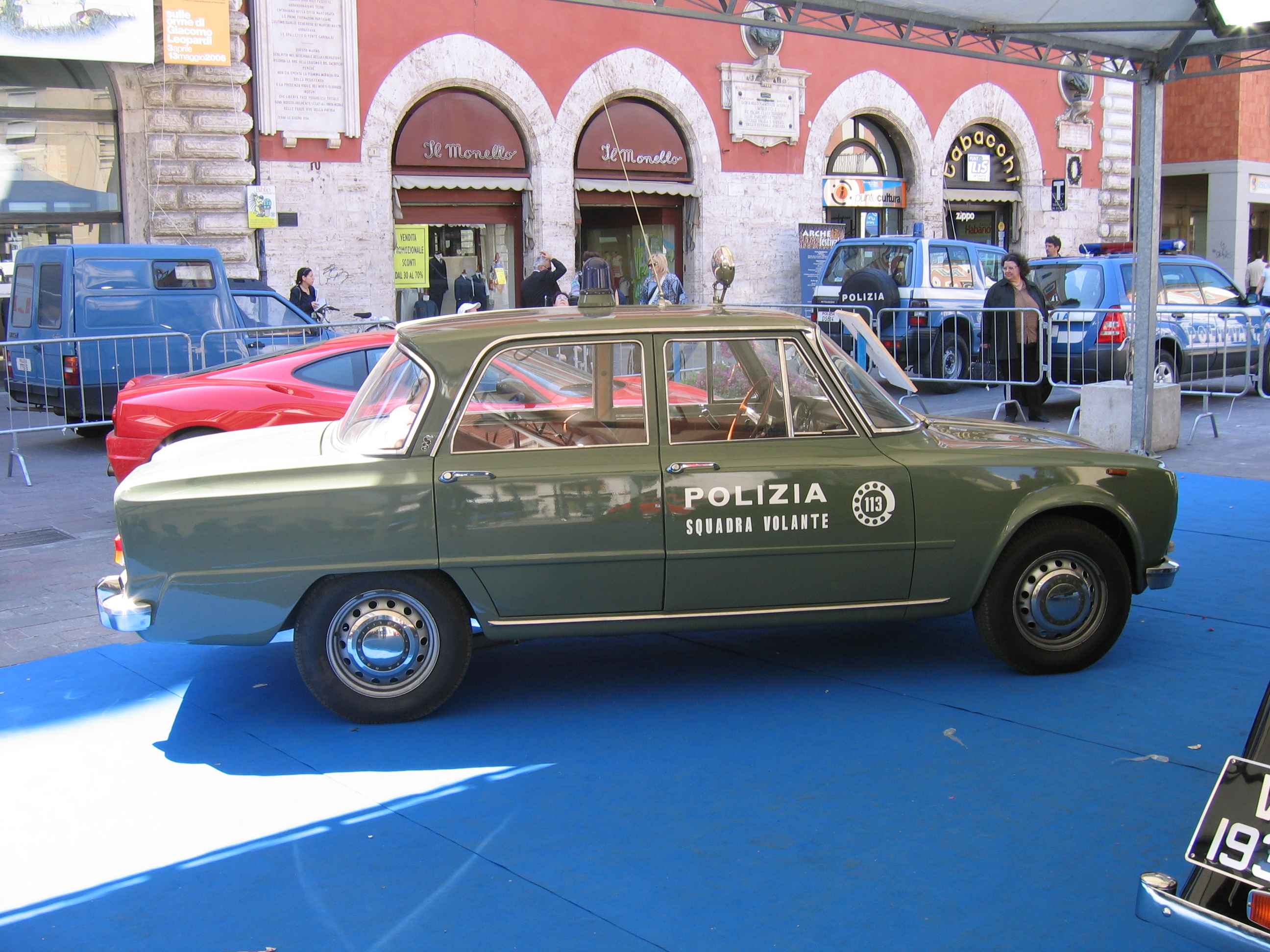
Historic Italian State Police "Panther" Alfa Romeo Giulia Super of the Flying Squad

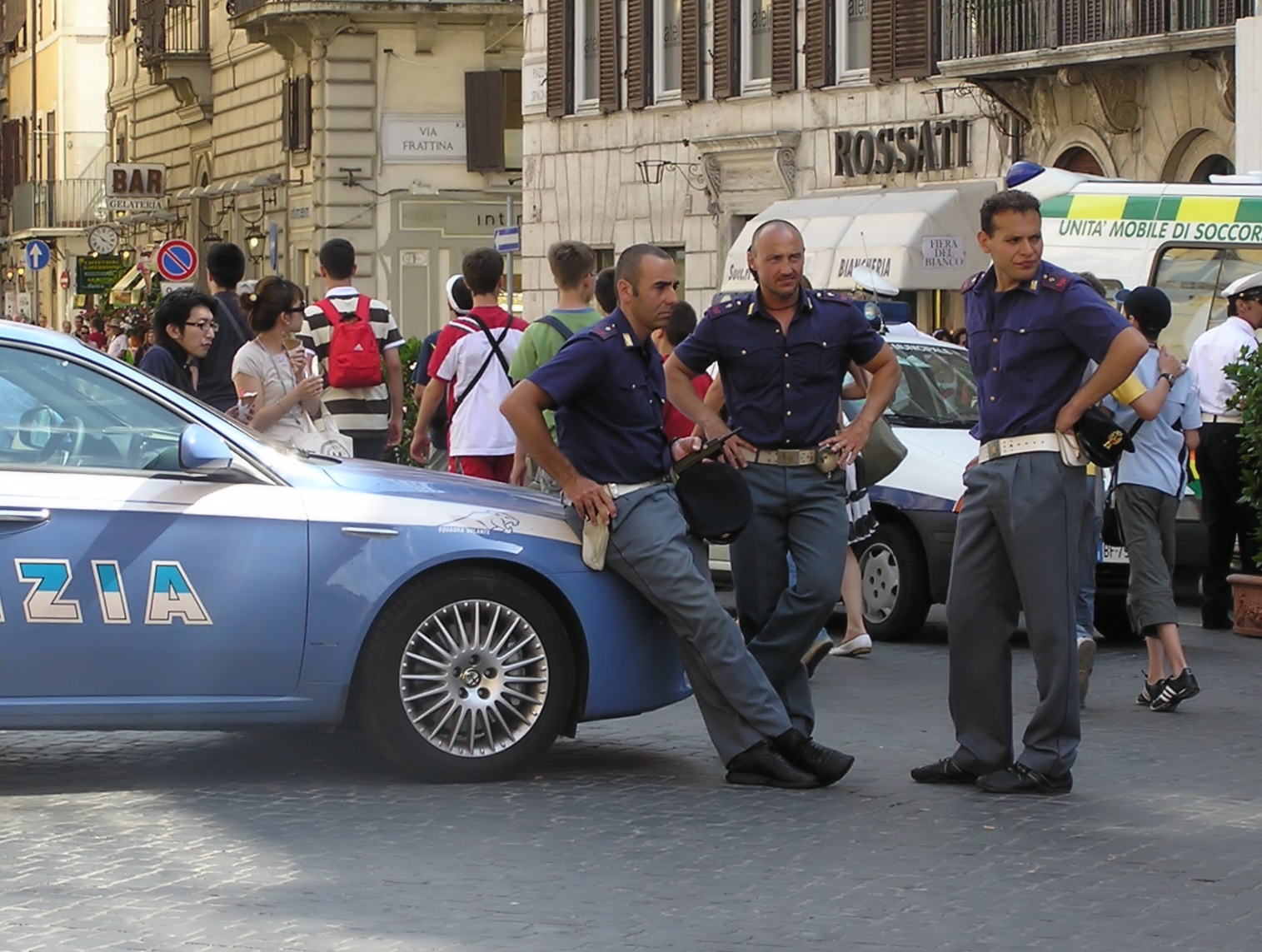
Italian policemen on duty in Piazza di Spagna, Rome, in 2007

Main Offices, Divisions and Specialties of the State Police (Uffici, Reparti e Specialità della Polizia di Stato):

- State Police Band (Banda Musicale della Polizia di Stato)
- Data processing and computer center (Centro Elaborazione Dati)
- Interregional and Regional Collection Centers (Centri Raccolta Ragionale ed Interregionale)
- Central Directorate for the Criminal Police (Direzione centrale della polizia criminale)
- Central Anticrime Directorate (Direzione centrale anticrimine)
- Central Directorate for the Anti-Terrorism Police (Direzione centrale della polizia di prevenzione)
- Central Direction for the Instruction Institutes (Direzione Centrale per gli Istituti d'Istruzione)
- General Inspectorate of Public Security for Civil Aviation and Ministry of Transportation (Ispettorato Generale di Pubblica Sicurezza preso il Ministero dei Trasporti e dell'Aviazione Civile)
- General Inspectorate of Public Security for Ministry of the Economic Development (Ispettorato Generale di Pubblica Sicurezza preso il Ministero dello Sviluppo Economico)
- General Inspectorate of Public Security for Ministry of Labor and the Social Politics (Ispettorato Generale di Pubblica Sicurezza presso il Ministero del Lavoro e delle Politiche Sociali)
- General Inspectorate of Public Security for Palace of the Viminale (Ispettorato Generale di Pubblica Sicurezza presso il Palazzo del Viminale) The Viminale is the headquarters of the Italian Ministry of Interior;
- General Inspectorate of Public Security for the Senate of the Republic (Ispettorato Generale di Pubblica Sicurezza presso il Senato della Repubblica)
- General Inspectorate of Public Security for the Chamber of the Deputies (Ispettorato Generale di Pubblica Sicurezza presso la Camera dei Deputati)
- General Inspectorate of Public Security for the Vatican City (Ispettorato Generale di Pubblica Sicurezza presso la Città del Vaticano)
- General Inspectorate of Public Security for the Presidency of the Council of Ministers (Ispettorato Generale di Pubblica Sicurezza presso la Presidenza del Consiglio dei Ministri)
- General Inspectorate of Public Security for the Presidency of the Republic (Ispettorato Generale di Pubblica Sicurezza presso la Presidenza della Repubblica)
- Central Operational Core of Security (Nucleo Operativo Centrale di Sicurezza – N.O.C.S.)
- Gaming and Betting police (Polizia dei Giochi e delle Scommesse)
- Alpine Aid (Soccorso Alpino)
- Postal and Communications Police (Polizia Postale e delle Comunicazioni)
- Immigration and Border Police (Polizia dell'Immigrazione e delle Frontiere)
- Air Border Police (Polizia di Frontiera Aerea)
- Maritime Police (Polizia Marittima)
- Railway Police (Polizia Ferroviaria)
- Scientific Police (Polizia Scientifica)
- Highway Police (Polizia Stradale)
- Police Mobile Units (Reparti Mobili)
- Mounted Divisions (Reparti a cavallo)
- Artificers Units (Unità Artificieri)
- K-9 Units (Unità Cinofili)
- Superior School of Police (Scuola Superiore di Polizia)
- Police Air Command (Reparti Volo)
- Medical Service (Servizio Sanitario)
- Gold Flames (Fiamme Oro)

=== Interregional organization ===
The Interregional Directorates (Direzioni Interregionali), organized since 2007, are:

- Piedmont, Aosta Valley and Liguria (HQ: Turin);
- Lombardy and Emilia-Romagna (HQ: Milan);
- Veneto, Trentino-Alto Adige/Südtirol and Friuli-Venezia Giulia (HQ: Padua);
- Tuscany, Umbria and Marche (HQ: Florence);
- Lazio, Sardinia and Abruzzo (HQ: Rome);
- Campania, Molise, Basilicata and Apulia (HQ: Naples);
- Sicily and Calabria (HQ: Catania).

=== Questure ===
There is a Questura in each of the 105 Italian provincial capitals. It is responsible for all the activities carried out by the Polizia di Stato within the province.

It is commanded by the Questore, who is the public safety authority and has at his disposal all the police forces in the territory of competence, including the Carabinieri and the Guardia di Finanza.

=== Commissariati di Pubblica Sicurezza ===
In major cities and highly populated towns, there are police stations named Commissariati di Pubblica Sicurezza (Public Security Offices). Each Commissariato di Pubblica Sicurezza is under the Authority of a Questura. Their task is to control, prevent and fight crime in their jurisdiction, and to deal with paperwork as to, among other things, requests for gun licences, passports, permits, and regularization of foreigners.

== Special operations ==
About 24,000 officers, that is almost a quarter of police personnel, work within the Highway Patrol (Polizia Stradale), Railroad Police (Polizia Ferroviaria), Postal and Telecommunications Police (Polizia Postale e delle Telecomunicazioni) and Border and Immigration Police (Polizia di Frontiera).

=== Highway patrol ===
The Polizia Stradale, or PolStrada for short, is a highway patrol organization. PolStrada police public roads all over the country, including the 7,000 kilometres (4,300 mi) of motorways (autostrada), the main highways and arterial roads outside towns. Their duties are the prevention and detection of driving offences, car accident reports, planning and carrying out services to regulate traffic, providing escorts for road safety, protection and control of the road network, rescue operations and cooperation in the collection of traffic flow data.

=== Railway Police ===
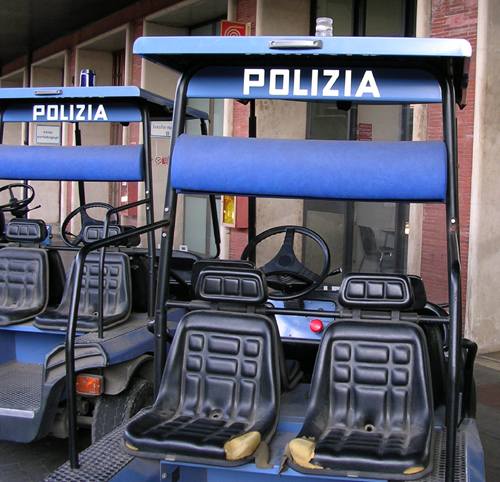
Police golf carts at Venice Railway Station

The Polizia Ferroviaria, or PolFer for short, ensure the security of travellers and their belongings on trains and at stations plus the safety and control of dangerous goods. Railroad Police officers patrol, in particular, long-distance and night trains, and at stations in big cities where vagrants often accumulate. Rete Ferroviaria Italiana and other Ferrovie dello Stato companies co-operate fully with the railroad police in dealing with railway security for passengers.

=== Post and telecommunications ===
The Polizia Postale e delle Comunicazioni, or Polizia Postale for short, investigates all crimes that use communications as part of its modus operandi such as computer hacking, online child pornography, credit card fraud, spreading computer viruses or software copyright violations.

=== Immigration and Border Police ===
To control the flow of migrants into Italy, the Department of Public Security set up the Immigration and Border Police Service (Polizia di Frontiera), to enforce regulations concerning the entry and stay of aliens in Italy. The service operates at both central and local levels with many land, air and maritime border police offices.

The service is also responsible for passport control, the issuing of residence permits, as well as the prevention and control of illegal immigration. Although due to the Schengen Agreement the land borders have disappeared, the division is still present on all borders to do systematic or random checks. In airports, the border police are in charge of security (hand baggage searches are done by airport companies or private security companies but are supervised by the Polizia di Frontiera and by the Guardia di Finanza) and immigration checks.

=== Mobile units ===
There are 13 mobile units of "Reparto Mobile" located in the main Italian cities. These can be deployed throughout the country to maintain public order with crowd-control equipment and vehicles or perform rescue services in areas affected by natural disasters. These units employ personnel that are trained and equipped for their task.

The P.d.S.'s bomb disposal units, mounted detachments, canine units, air support squadrons and maritime and river police units all fall under the mobile unit HQ.

=== Anti-Terrorism Police ===
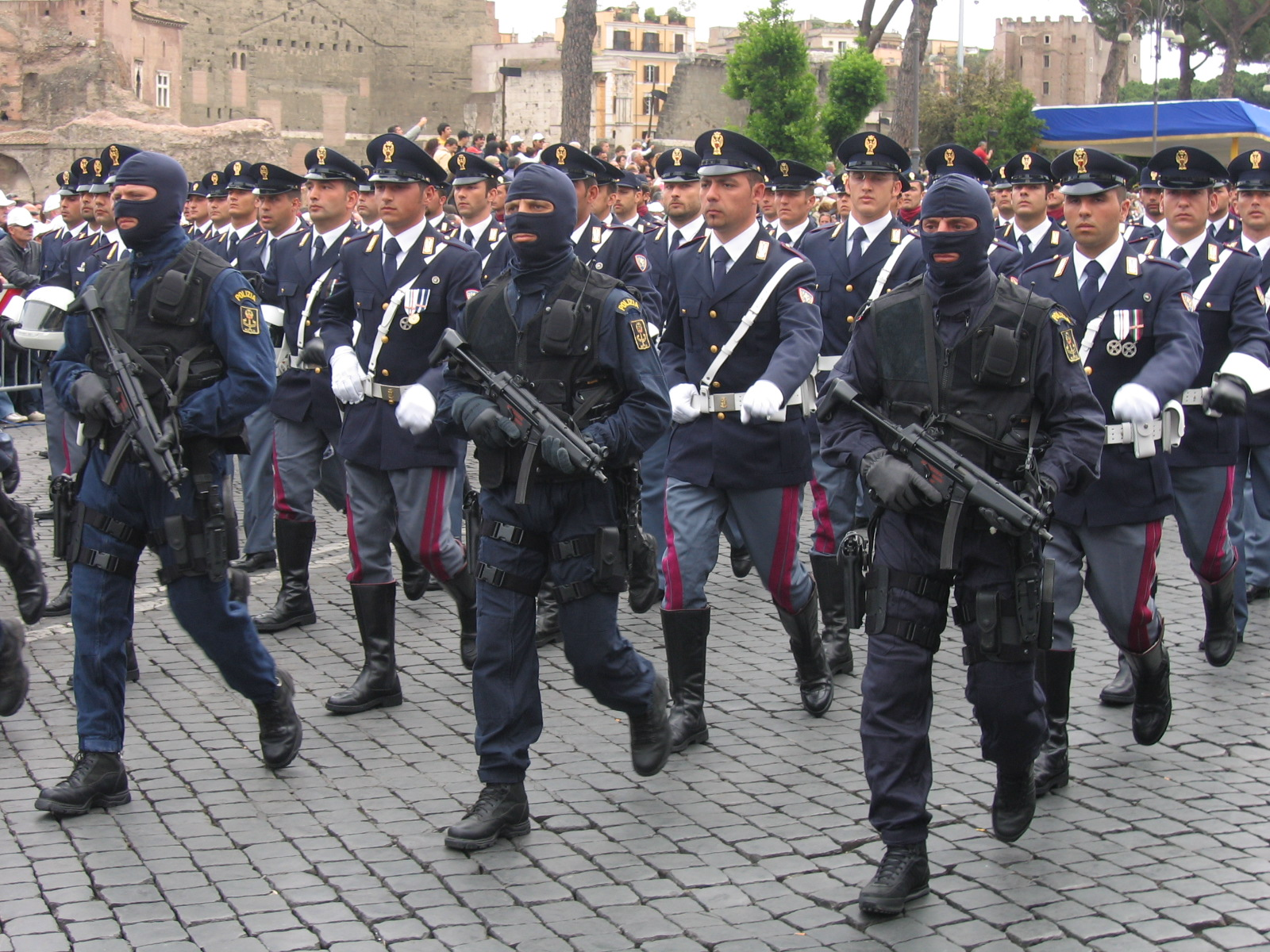
Photo of Army Parade in Rome, 2 June 2006, Republic Day. NOCS special groups.

The Anti-Terrorism Police is a specialist body made up of the Central Directorate for the Anti-Terrorism Police and of the Branches for General Investigations and Special Operations Division (DIGOS – Divisione Investigazioni Generali e Operazioni Speciali), located in the questure at the local level. The Directorate for the Anti-Terrorism Police has two departments: one is mainly responsible for information collection and analysis while the other develops and coordinates investigations aimed at preventing and fighting terrorism. The Nucleo Operativo Centrale di Sicurezza (Central Operational Core of Security) is the State Police's elite police tactical unit.

== Training ==
Entry into the Italian State Police is achieved through a public competitive exam based on qualifications and examinations. The announcement may include specific quotas reserved for personnel already serving or for the children of victims of duty.

Starting from 1 January 2005, following Law No. 226 of 23 August 2004, all positions in the recruitment process for trainee police officers were reserved exclusively for individuals who were serving or had completed a voluntary term in the Italian Armed Forces, either as one-year volunteers (VFP1) or four-year volunteers (VFP4).

Since 1 January 2016, the competitions have once again been opened to civilian applicants, provided they meet all the required criteria, maintain an unblemished record, and fall within the required age limits. Nonetheless, part of the available positions continues to be reserved for fixed-term volunteers of the Armed Forces.

The recruitment procedures are still governed by several decrees of the Ministry of the Interior: Decree No. 115 of 6 April 1999, and Decree No. 276 of 2 December 2002; psycho-physical eligibility requirements are established by Decree No. 198 of 30 June 2003, while the exam subjects are regulated by Decree No. 129 of April 28, 2005.

After passing the competition, the successful candidates are assigned to the appropriate training institutions (such as the Trainee Officers’ School or the Higher Police School), with training durations varying depending on the role.

A general regulatory framework for recruitment is also provided by Legislative Decree No. 66 of 15 March 2010, which includes additional reservations of positions in cases strictly defined by law.

== Weapons ==
Weapon	Origin	Type
Beretta 92FS	Italy	Standard issue sidearm
HK MP5	Germany	Submachine gun
Beretta PM 12	Italy	Submachine gun, to be retired
Beretta PMX	Italy	Submachine gun, replacing the PM12
Beretta AR70/90	Italy	Assault rifle
Benelli	Italy	Shotgun
Franchi GL-40/90	Italy	Riot control weapon made under license by Heckler & Koch.

== Vehicles ==
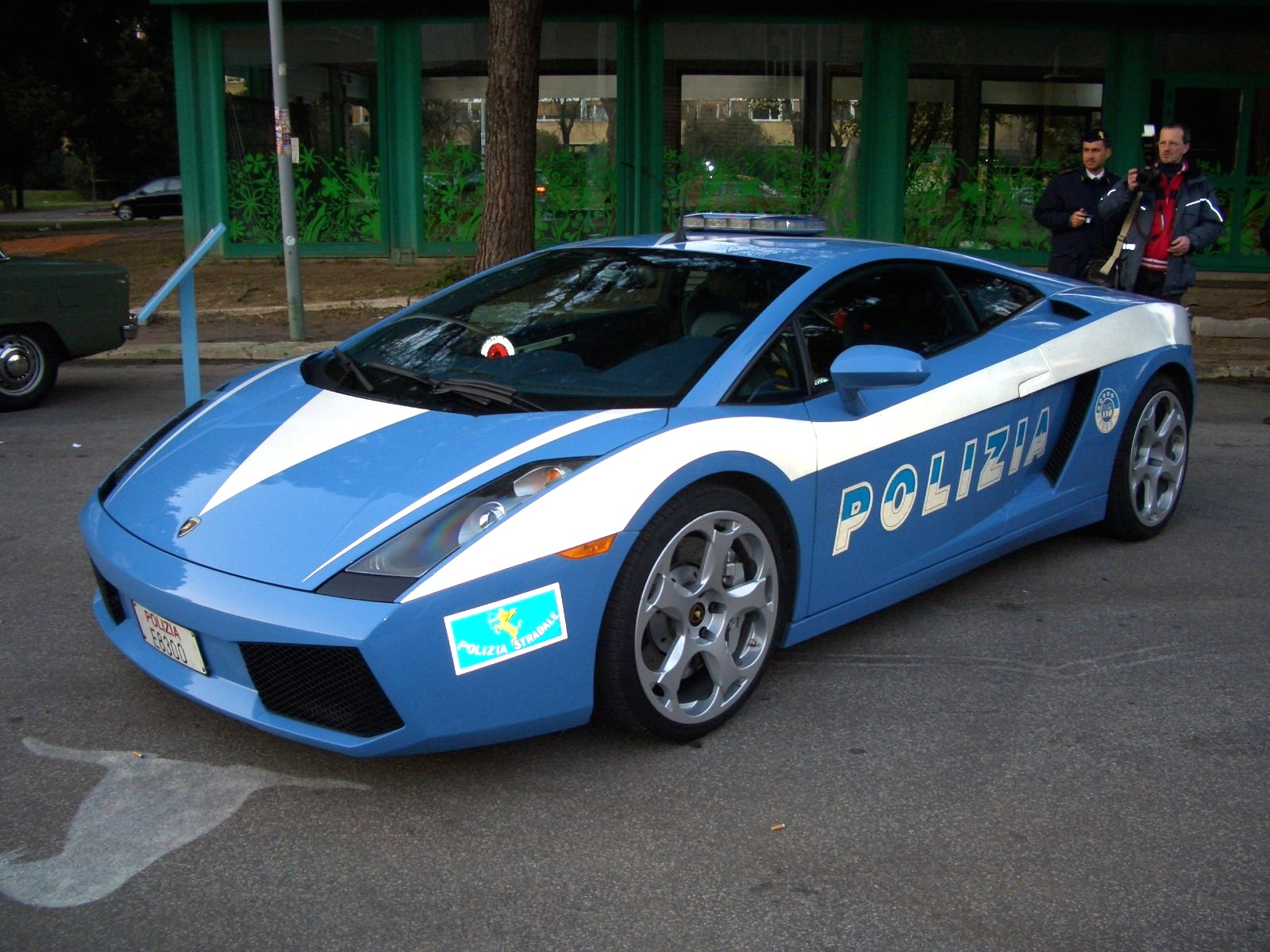
Polizia di Stato Lamborghini Gallardo

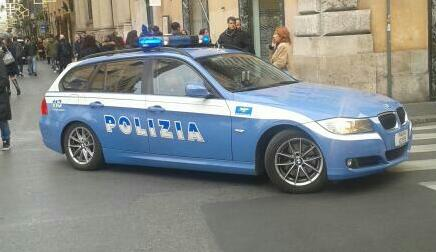
BMW E91 Polizia di Stato

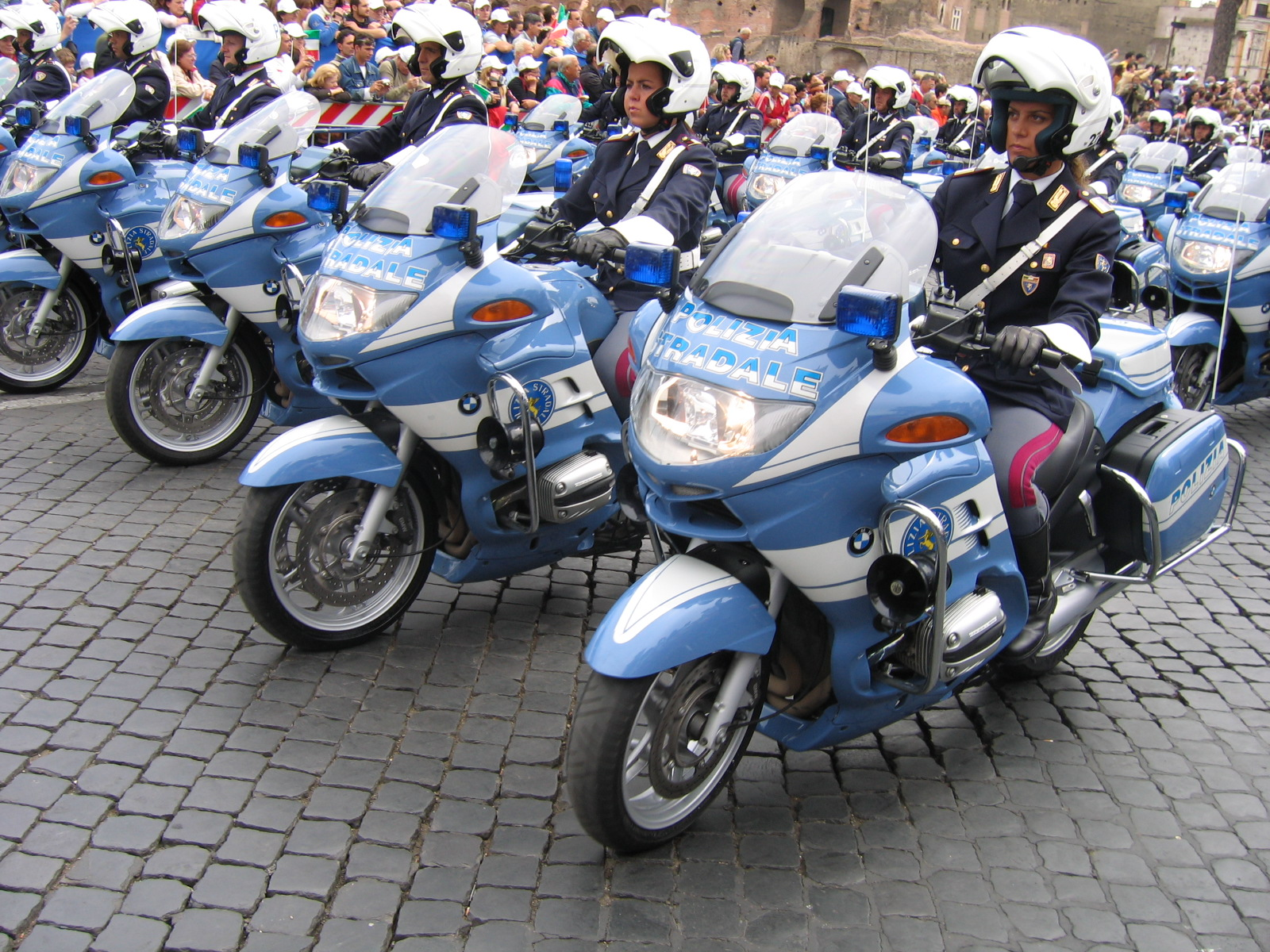
Motorcyclists of the Polizia Stradale in Rome

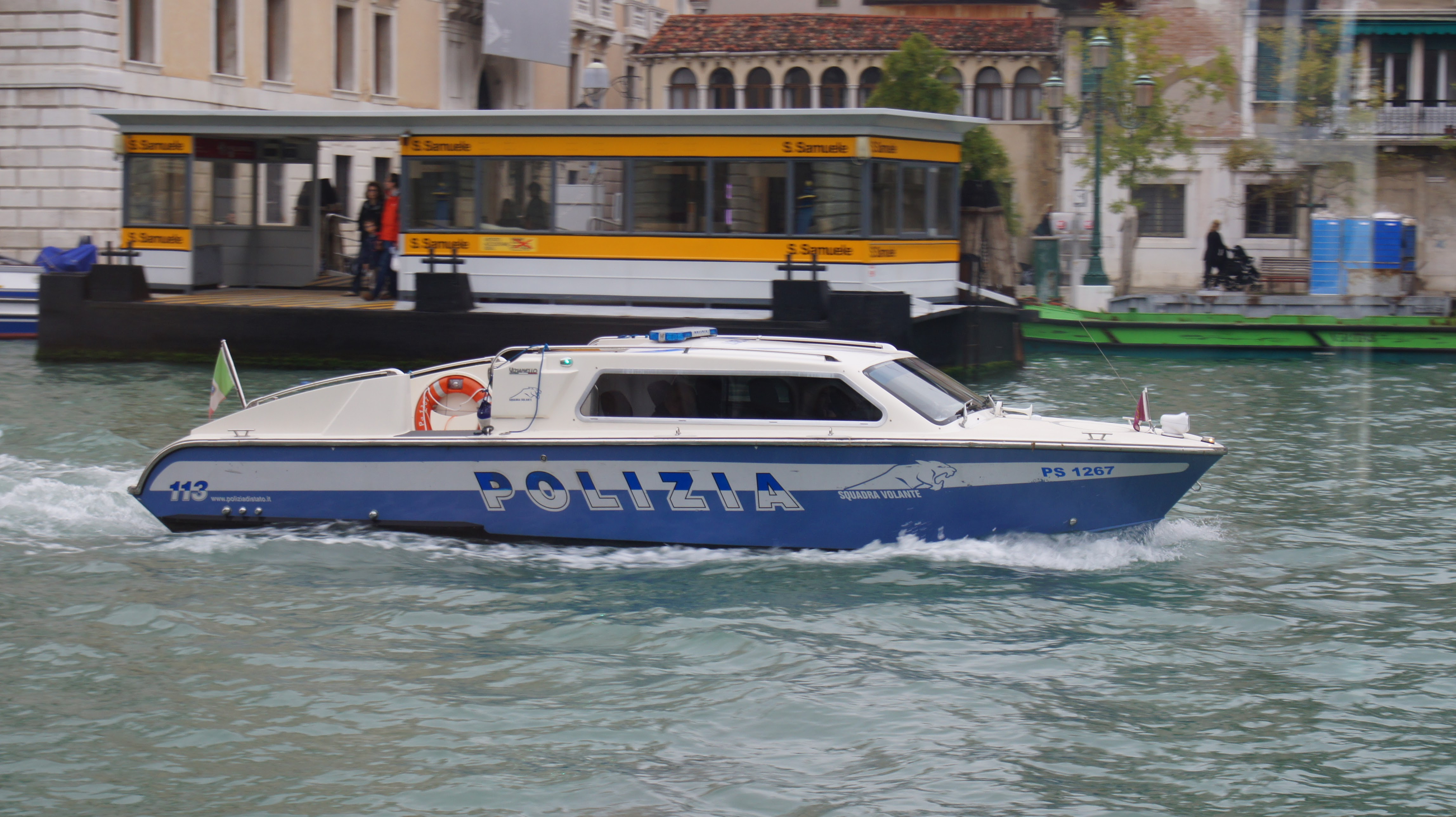
A state police boat in Venice

The State Police use Italian vehicles ranging from 1994 Fiat Puntos to the Alfa Romeo 159 2,4 JTD, and the Alfa Romeo 155 8v and foreign makes such as the Subaru Legacy SW and Subaru Forester, BMW E46 and E91, and the Volvo XC70. In May 2004 the PdS received two Lamborghini Gallardos equipped with V10 engines and 520 bhp (390 kW) in the classic blue-white livery with accessories such as a container for transporting organs and a defibrillator. The cars are used on the A2 Salerno-Reggio Calabria and the A14 Bologna-Taranto motorways.

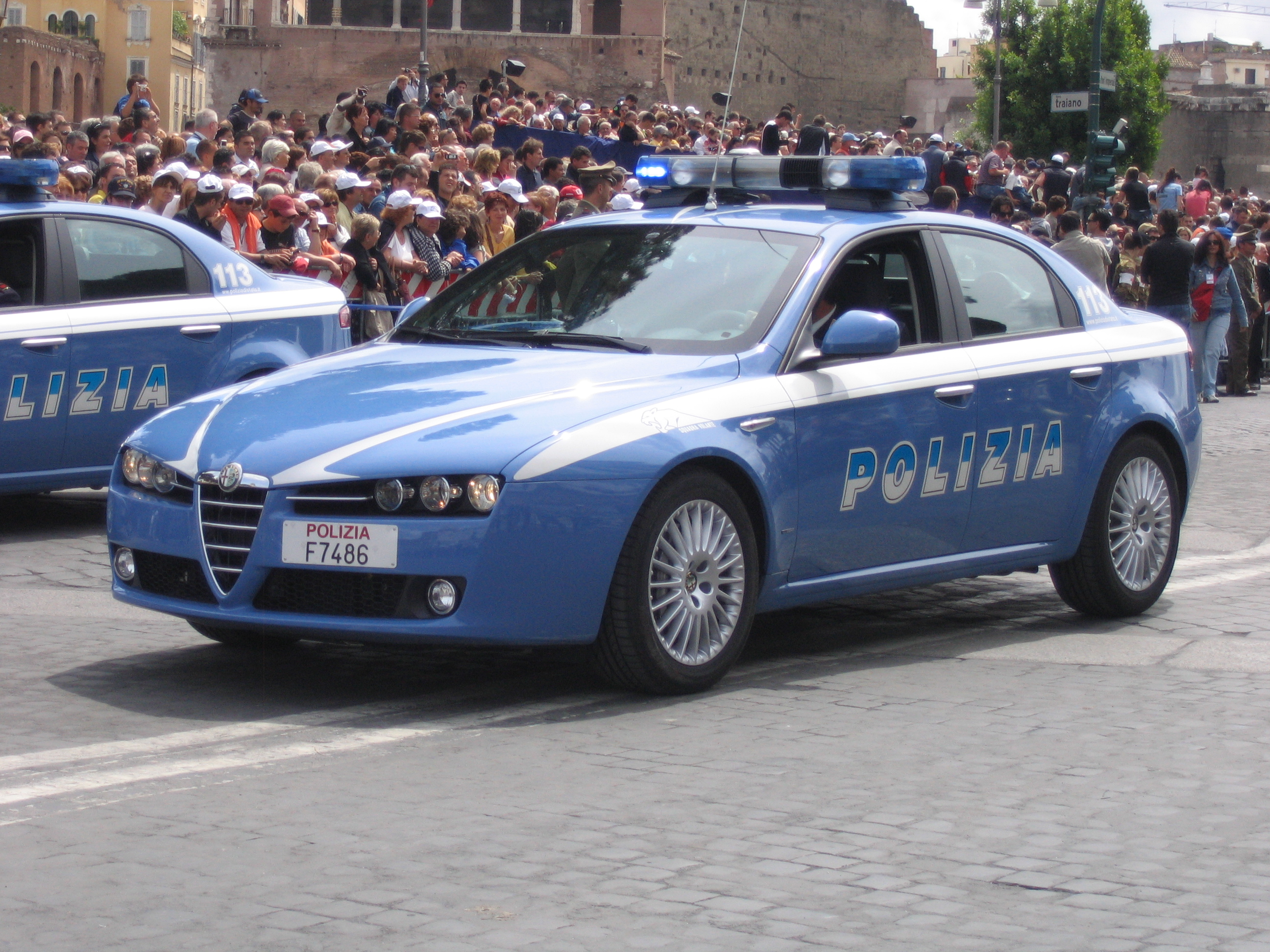
Alfa Romeo 159 Polizia di Stato

On 29 November 2009, one of the two Gallardos was severely damaged in an accident while returning from a public display in Cremona: it crashed into some parked cars while avoiding another car which crossed the road illegally. The Gallardo was fully insured, and is currently being repaired by Lamborghini itself.

On 30 March 2017, the PdS received the second Lamborghini Huracán equipped with V10 engines and 520 bhp in the classic blue-white livery with accessories such as a container for transporting organs and a defibrillator.

== Rank structure and insignia ==
=== Directors of Police ===
The directors of police are not sworn police officers, but senior civil servants, and are not uniformed.

- Capo della Polizia – Direttore Generale della Pubblica Sicurezza (Chief of Police – Director General of Public Security) is the chief of the Polizia di Stato, and head of the Department of Public Security in the Ministry of Interior and as such in charge of coordinating all Italian police forces.
- Vice capo vicario della polizia di Stato (Deputy Chief of Police)
- Vice Direttore generale – Direttore Centrale Polizia Criminale (Deputy Director General – Director of Central Criminal Police)
- Vice Direttore generale (Deputy Director General), in charge of planning and coordination.

=== Executive Officers ===
Rank	Technical Rank	Medical Rank	Insignia	Cap band	Promotion notes
Dirigente Generale (General Director)	Dirigente Generale Tecnico	Dirigente Generale Medico			
Dirigente Superiore (Superior Director)	Dirigente Superiore Tecnico	Dirigente Superiore Medico			

=== Director Officers ===
Rank	Technical Rank	Medical Rank	Insignia	Cap band	Promotion notes
Primo dirigente (First Director)	Primo dirigente tecnico	Primo dirigente medico			Promotion to Primo dirigente through selection after 5 years as Vice Questore.
Vice Questore (Deputy Chief)	Direttore tecnico superiore	Medico superiore			Promotion to Vice Questore through selection after 5 years as Vice Questore aggiunto.
Vice Questore Aggiunto (Assistant Deputy Chief)	Direttore tecnico capo	Medico capo			After 6 years service as Commissario capo: 80% of the promotions go to direct entry officers after scrutiny. 20% of the promotions go to internal entry officers with a master's degree after a promotional exam.
Commissario Capo (Chief Commissioner)	Commissario capo tecnico	Medico principale			Direct after graduation from the police academy for those who entered through direct entry. For others, after 5 years service as Commissario.
Commissario (Commissioner)	Commissario tecnico	Medico			After two years service as Vice commissario for internal entry officers.
Vice Commissario (Deputy Commissioner)	Vice Commissario tecnico				Direct entry: 80% from candidates with a Master's Degree and not over 30 years old. 20% are reserved for serving policemen with a Master's Degree, and not over 40 years of age; half of them from the Ispettori, half from the other ranks. They are holding the rank of Vice commissario at the academy. Internal entry: 80% from Ispettori with a bachelor's degree, 5 years of service, not over 35 years of age. 20% from Sostituto Commissari not over 55 years old. They are promoted to the rank of Vice commissario after graduation from the academy.

=== Inspectors ===
Rank	Technical rank	Insignia	Cap band	Promotion notes
Sostituto Commissario Coordinatore (Station Inspector Coordinator)	Sostituto Commissario Coordinatore tecnico			Promotion to Ispettore Superiore Sostituto Commissario Coordinatore after 4 years of service as Ispettore Superiore Sostituto Commissario.
Sostituto Commissario (Station Inspector)	Sostituto Commissario tecnico			Promotion to Ispettore Superiore Sostituto Commissario based on scrutiny and at least 8 years of service as Ispettore Superiore.
Ispettore Superiore (Senior Inspector)	Ispettore Superiore tecnico			Promotion to Ispettore Superiore based on scrutiny and at least 9 years of service as Ispettore Capo, as well as the possession of a Bachelor's degree.
Ispettore Capo (Chief Inspector)	Ispettore Capo tecnico			Promotion to Ispettore Capo after scrutiny.
Ispettore (Inspector)	Ispettore tecnico			Promotion to Ispettore after 5 years of service as Vice ispettore
Vice Ispettore (Sub-inspector)	Vice Ispettore tecnico			50% are recruited through direct entry from civilian life; 50% are recruited from lower ranks with at least 5 years of service. For both recruitments, a secondary school diploma qualifying for university studies is required.

=== Superintendent ===
Rank	Technical rank	Insignia	Cap band	Promotion notes
Sovrintendente Capo Coordinatore (Chief Sergeant Coordinator)	Sovrintendente Capo Coordinatore tecnico			Promotion to Sovrintendente capo coordinatore after 8 years of service as Sovrintendente capo
Sovrintendente Capo (Chief Sergeant)	Sovrintendente Capo tecnico			Promotion to Sovrintendente capo based on scrutiny and at least 5 years of service as Sovrintendente
Sovrintendente (Sergeant)	Sovrintendente tecnico			Promotion to Sovrintendente after 5 years of service as an Vice sovrintendente
Vice Sovrintendente (Lance Sergeant)	Vice Sovrintendente tecnico			70% are recruited through selection from Assistente Capo; 30% from Agenti and Assistenti with at least 4 years of service through an examination.

=== Agent and Assistant ===
Rank	Technical rank	Insignia	Cap band	Promotion notes
Assistente Capo Coordinatore (Chief Assistant Coordinator)	Assistente Capo Coordinatore tecnico			Promotion to Assistente capo coordinatore after 8 years of service as an Assistente capo
Assistente Capo (Chief Assistant)	Assistente Capo tecnico			Promotion to Assistente capo based on scrutiny and at least 4 years of service as an Assistente
Assistente (Assistant)	Assistente tecnico			Promotion to Assistente based on scrutiny and at least 5 years of service as an Agente scelto
Agente Scelto (Senior Constable)	Agente Scelto tecnico			Promotion to Agente scelto based on scrutiny and at least 5 years of service as an Agente
Agente (Constable)	Agente tecnico			Civilians and volunteers of the Italian Armed Forces are eligible to take part in the exam to become an Agente

== Decorations awarded to the State Police ==
- 1 Knight's Cross of the Military Order of Italy
- 17 Gold Medals of Civil Valour
- 14 Gold Medals of Civil Merit
- 3 Silver Medals of Civil Merit
- 1 Bronze Medal of Civil Merit
- 2 Bronze Medals of Militar Valour
- 1 Gold Medal of Public Health Merit
- 1 Bronze Medal of Civil Defense Excellence 1st Class
- 2 separate Medals of Merited Service in Earthquake Relief (1908 and 1915, respectively)
- UN Peacekeeping Medal (for service as part of UNMIK Kosovo 1995–2004)

== See also ==
- Law enforcement in Italy
- Corps of Gendarmerie of Vatican City
