= Reparto volanti =

Italian police unit

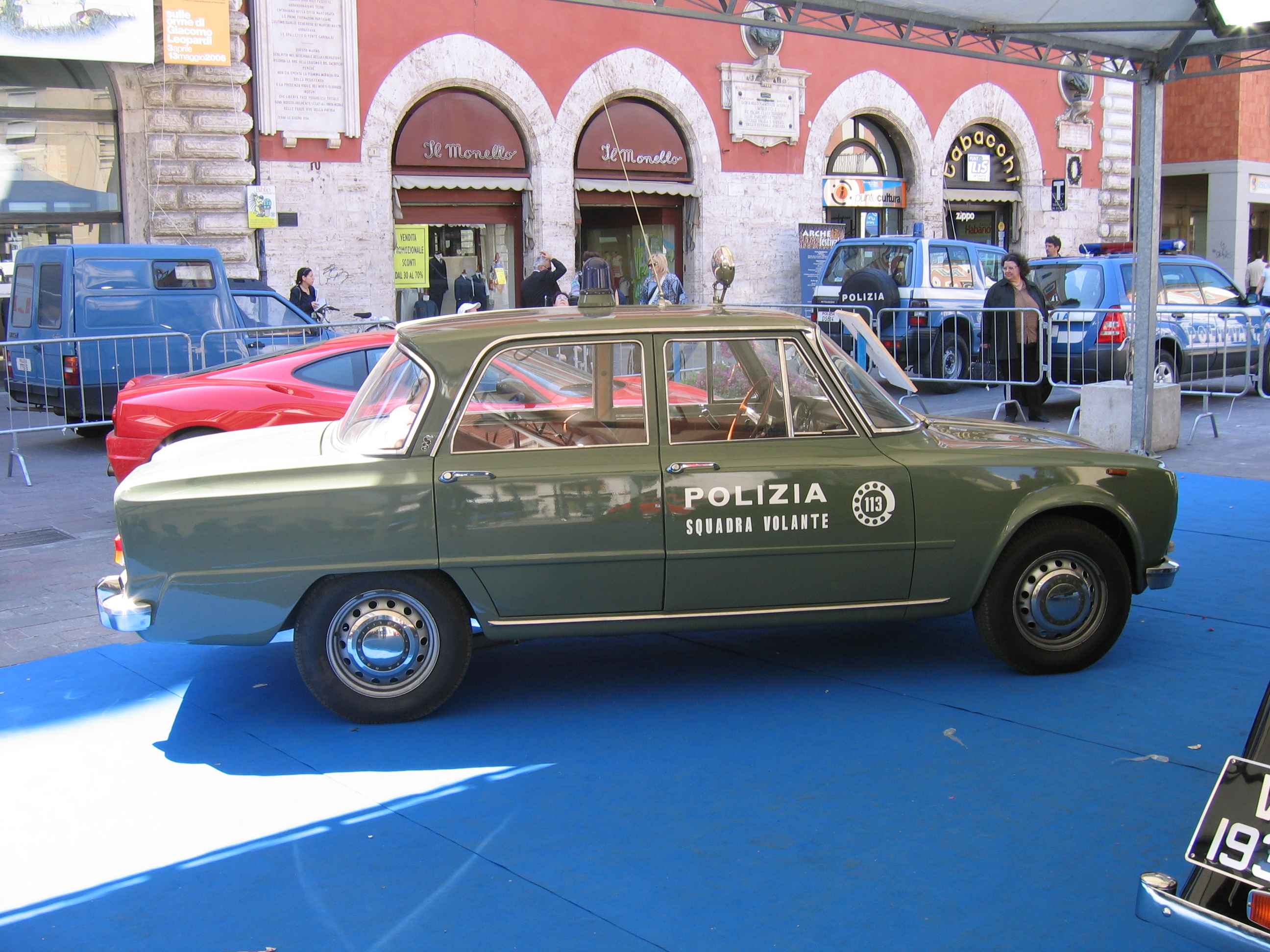
Italian State Police Flying Squad "Panther" Alfa Giulia Super

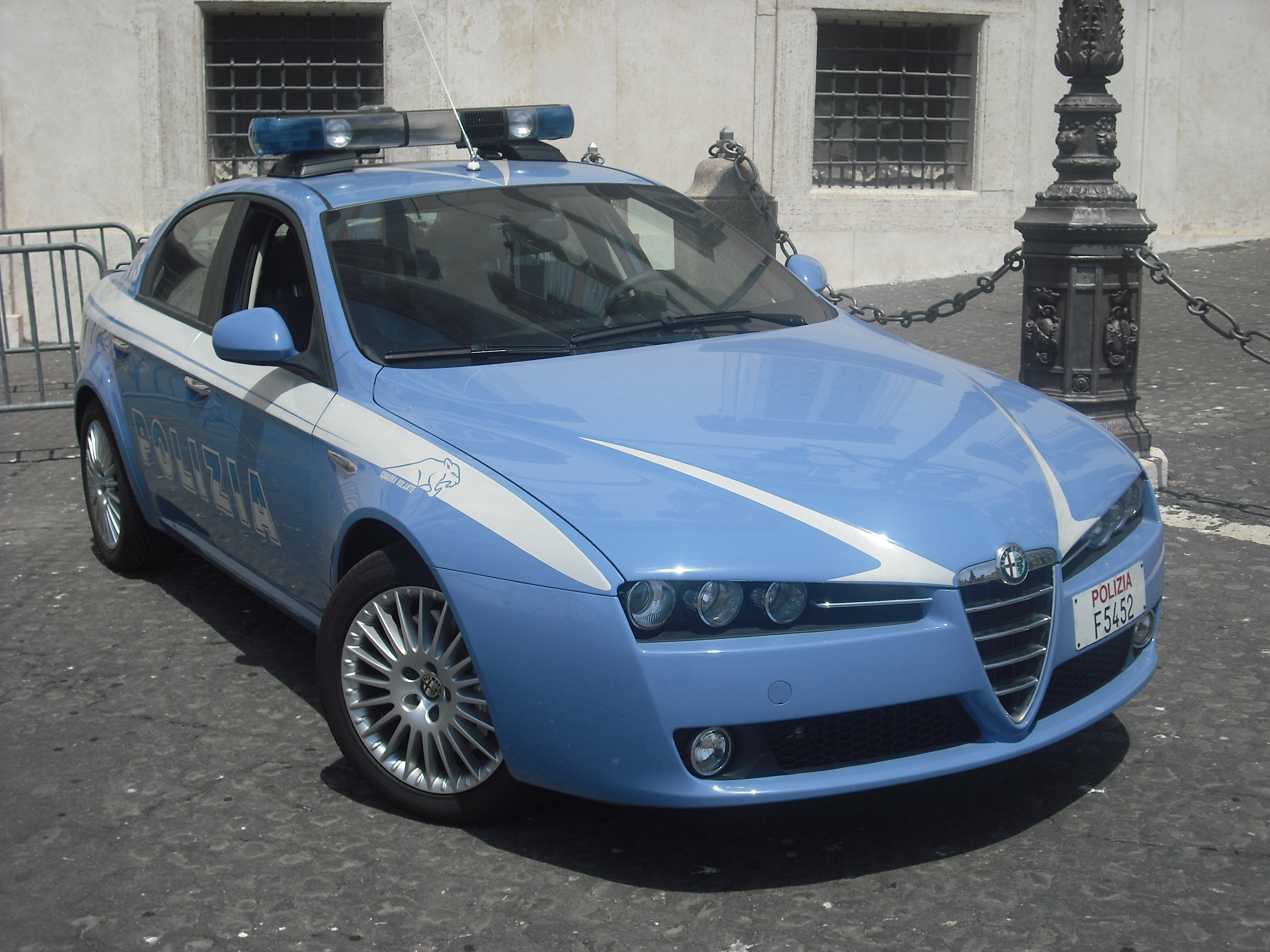
The cars currently supplied to Flying Squads, identified by traditional panther on the side, are the Alfa Romeo 159 2.4 JTDM (200 bhp), the second type of vehicle after the Fiat Marea specially designed to perform emergency service with only two operators board: driver and patrol chief. On other cars, however, can also be a "wingman" for extraordinary services to control the territory (patrols) or prevention.

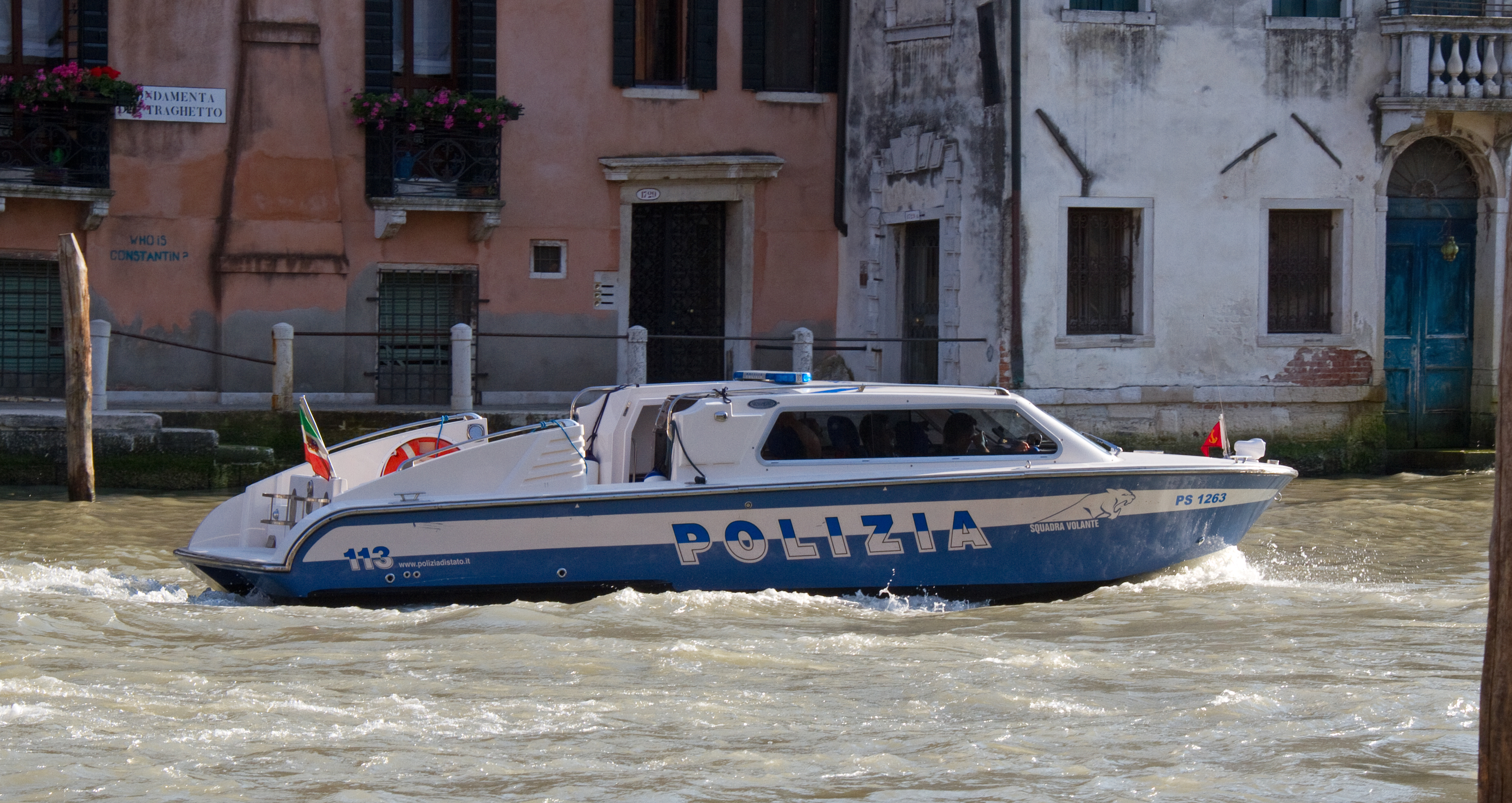
Reparto volanti police boat

The Reparto volanti ("Mobile Division"), that dispatch the various Squadre Volanti (mobile squads or flying squad (lit.)), is a section of the Ufficio Prevenzione Generale e Soccorso Pubblico (Office of General Prevention and Public Aid) of the Italian State Police. Headed by a high ranking member of the State Police, they are present in every "Questura", the provincial office of the Public Safety Department, which is the ministerial branch Italian State Police belongs to. The same service is also performed by personnel of Police Precincts, whose first-response vehicles work alongside and under the same provincial dispatch office that resides in the Questura, making them all identical.

All patrol vehicles used by this division are specifically equipped for this kind of response, including reinforcing plates in the bodywork, especially in the doors, bulletproof and shatterproof windows and the iconic prisoner transport partition behind the first row of seats.

Police precincts also have non-bulletproof emergency vehicles that do not log in with the first-response division, but are equally capable of responding to an event, which are called "Autoradio" (radio car or, like in other states radio motor patrol (RMP)) instead.

The mobile units are the public face of the State Police because their crews are in direct contact with citizens. Though the police emergency number in some provinces is now 112, adhering to the Europe-wide standard, the units continue to respond to all calls coming to 113, the original number in Italy. They address all types of incidents, from simple noise complaints and domestic incidents to serious crimes such as fights, muggings, robberies or murders.

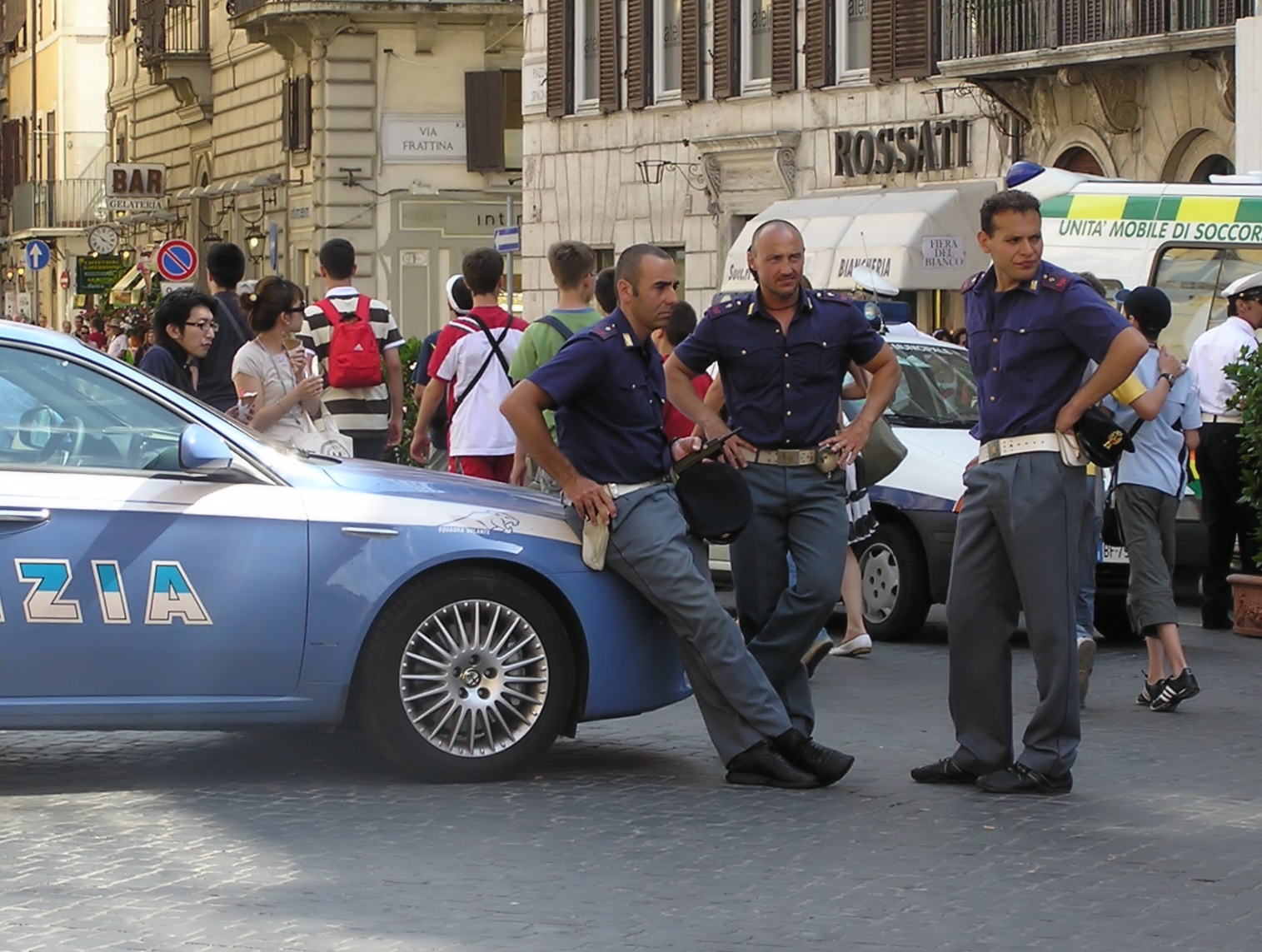
Polizia di Stato reparto volante in Rome

Mobile units often patrol beats, with the number of simultaneous patrols depending on the size of the Questura. In medium and large cities, each patrol is assigned a beat, or a specific and precise area route to be covered. Beats usually coincide with areas of jurisdiction of police precincts in the area, and there may be more than one volante (nickname for emergency response patrol cars, literally translated: "flying") per precinct area.

Each Mobile Division of a Questura is headed by an inspector coordinator per shift who is responsible for all units on duty. This inspector provides the specific direction for all the squads under his or her command. Currently Rome is the only city in which a 2nd Mobile Division has been inaugurated as of December 3, 2019.

The patrols, in addition to their role of responding to crimes in progress also work in the area of crime prevention. The officers of the Mobile Division know their beat and the people who usually frequent it, carefully observe their surroundings, and work to prevent crime.
