= Polizia Ferroviaria =

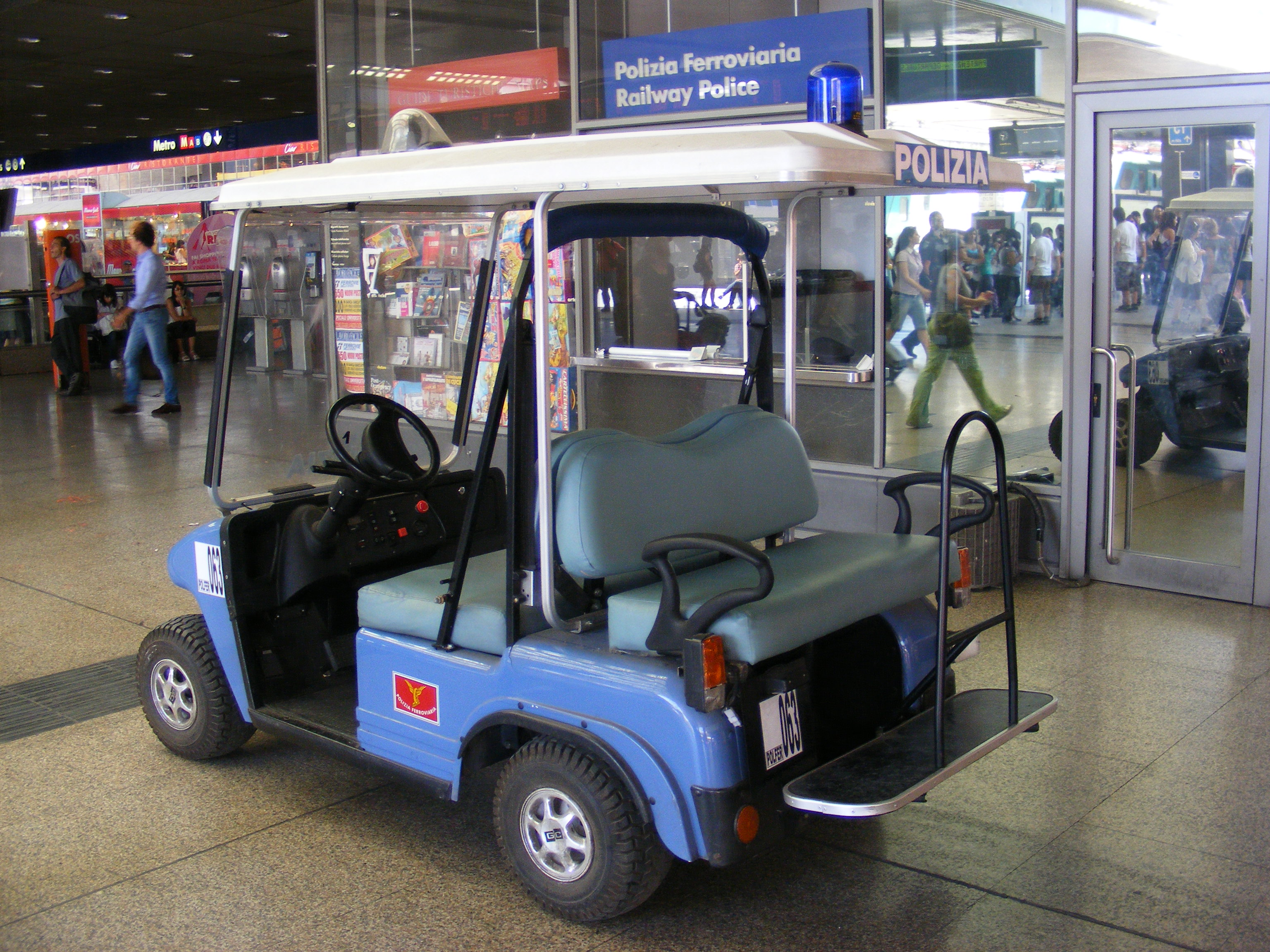
Cart and Police station of the Polizia Ferroviaria

The Polizia Ferroviaria (English: Railway Police) are the branch of the Italian Polizia di Stato responsible for policing the Italian state railways, the Ferrovie dello Stato.

== See also ==
- Transit police
