= Polizia Postale e delle Comunicazioni =

- Common name: (in Italian) la Postale
- Abbreviation: PolTel

Agency overview
- Formed: 1981; 1998 (as Polizia Postale e delle Comunicazioni)

Jurisdictional structure
- National agency: Italy
- Operations jurisdiction: Italy

Operational structure
- Headquarters: Rome
- Parent agency: Polizia di Stato
- Child agencies: Centro nazionale anticrimine informatico per la protezione delle infrastrutture critiche^{a}; Unità di analisi sul crimine informatico^{b}; Centro nazionale per il contrasto alla pedopornografia sulla rete^{c}

Facilities
- Patrol cars: Fiat Punto; Fiat Stilo

Notables
- Significant operations: Investigation and suppression of cybercrimes; Fighting online child pornography and pedophilia; Postal frauds

Website
- www.commissariatodips.it

The Polizia Postale e delle Comunicazioni (English: Postal and Communications Police) is a branch of the Polizia di Stato, one of the national police forces of Italy. Its responsibilities include the investigation of cybercrimes.

== History ==
PolTel was created in 1981 as a special department of the Polizia di Stato in order to ensure the safety, prevention and repression of crimes related to mail and telecommunications.

Initially, it oversaw postal offices and protected armoured trucks during operations of valuables transport. The personnel was active in vigilance services for money and valuables transport operated by Ferrovie dello Stato Italiane, along with the railroad police (Polfer).

After a privatization process in Italy and the foundation of Poste Italiane in 1998, the police service has been renamed in "Polizia Postale e delle Comunicazioni".

Following the reform of the public security administration, the Postal and Communications Police has become a cutting-edge "special division" of the State Police against cybercrimes, respecting the constitutional values of privacy and freedom.

== Organization ==
The interministerial decree issued on 19 January 1999 describes the postal police as the "central body of the Ministry of the Interior for its security and the telecommunications services regularity":

The postal and communications police service, with its headquarters in Rome, coordinates 20 divisions located in every regional capital city (e.g., Milan, Florence, Naples, etc.), except for the Aosta Valley which belongs to Turin's department.

Sicily is divided in two departments with their headquarters located in Palermo (Sicilia occidentale) and Catania (Sicilia orientale).

The departments have regional competence and generally they are directed by a First executive of the State Police. Departments coordinate in turn the sections inside their territory.

There are 76 sections of PolTel and each of them has provincial competence, under the direction of Inspectors.

== Tasks ==
PolTel represents the branch of the Italian Police specialized in prevention, control and repression of all the penal and administrative crimes belonging to the communication field, criminal activities on the internet and cybercrime in general.

PolTel performs judicial investigation for all the cybercrimes added by time into the Italian penal code, and for all crimes committed through more recent IT. Judicial police activity is not exclusively a web-intelligence one (monitoring chat lines, newsgroup, social network, etc), but it is also competent in: hacking (intrusions, computer damages), telephony (fixed and mobile, VoIP), privacy, eventually author's rights and copyright (videos, music, pay TV), e-commerce, surveillance over radio and TV frequencies, frauds related to home banking, political subversion, terrorism, illegal trades of drugs, weapons and explosives, or every traditional crime that have a computer as a target or medium.

=== High competence on cybercrimes ===
Ministry of Interior's decree issued on 28 April 2006 says that:

In the context of its institutional duties, the postal and communication Police Service of the State Police carries out intelligence activities for prevention and contrast to the use and forgery of the means of payment, a field with immediate effects on the e-commerce and where the investigative attention of speciality sectors is focused on software and hardware technologies used to understand, replicate and employ identities, codes and credit card for electronic transactions.

Competences of every Police force, including PolTel, has been revised by the Minniti Decree of 15 August 2017, which defines:

The modalities of exercise, primarily or exclusively, belonging to the State Police, the Carabinieri Corps and the Financial Guard Corps, and of the institutional tasks in the respective specialty sectors are defined by Article 2, paragraph 1 of the legislative decree n. 177 of 19 August 2016.

PolTel is also engaging in investigations to prevent and counteract copyright violations which can be performed online, cooperating with other Italian Police forces and in particular with Guardia di Finanza according to the art. 2, paragraph 2, letter l of the legislative decree n. 68 of 2001.

The special police department guarantees also the general integrity and functionality of the computer network, including the protection of critical infrastructures managed with IT systems and of all national strategic assets.

PolTel controls the security and regularity of the telecommunication services and contrasts online child pornography, according to the art. 7-bis of the decree-law n. 144 of 27 July 2005 converted with modifications by law n. 155 of 31 July 2005, where are described the tasks of the Centro nazionale anticrimine informatico per la protezione delle infrastrutture critiche (CNAIPIC), and according to art. 19 of law n. 38 of 6 February 2006, n. 38.

== Cooperations ==
According to the law, it has an exclusive on struggling against online child pornography. PolTel operates closely with the Autorità per le Garanzie nelle Comunicazioni (AGCOM) and the regional communication inspectorates of the Ministry of Economic Development.

PolTel has signed agreements with agencies and companies as Poste Italiane, Associazione Bancaria Italiana, GSE S.p.A. (Gestore dei servizi energetici), Ferrovie dello Stato, hospitals, etc.

== See also ==
- Polizia di Stato

== Notes ==
^a English: National Cybercrime Center for Critical Infrastructure Protection
^b English: Cybercrime Analysis Unit
^c English: National Center to Combat Child Pornography on the Internet
