= Luciana Lamorgese =

Italian civil servant (born 1953)

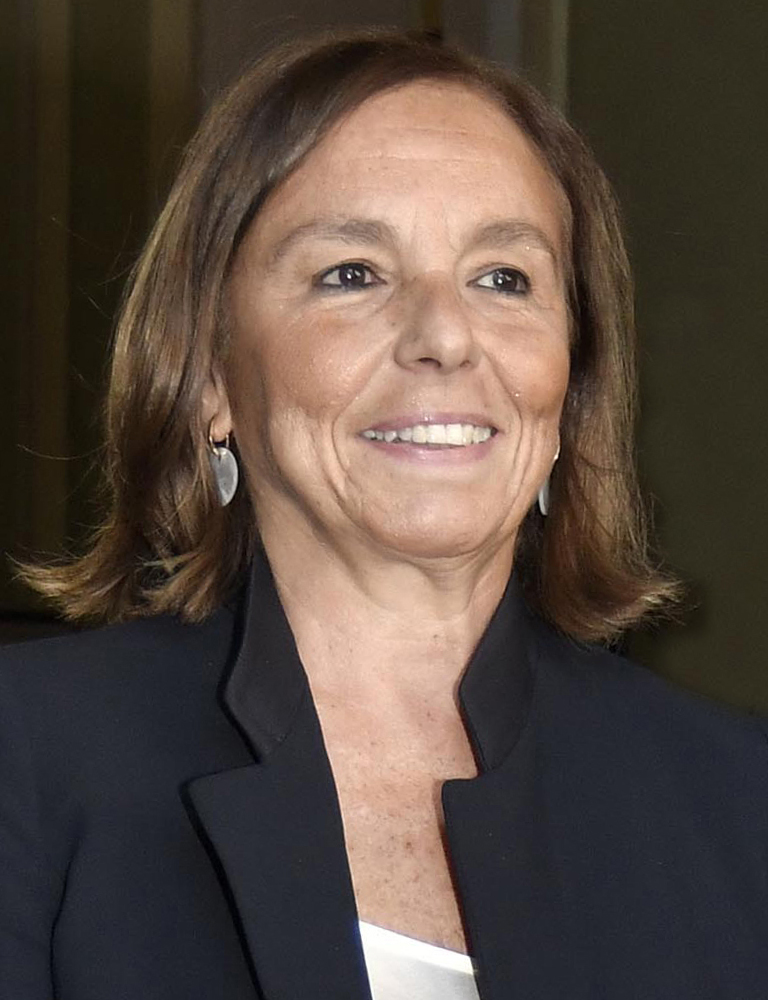

Minister of the Interior
- In office 5 September 2019 – 22 October 2022
- Prime Minister: Giuseppe Conte; Mario Draghi
- Preceded by: Matteo Salvini
- Succeeded by: Matteo Piantedosi

Personal details
- Born: 11 September 1953 (age 73) Potenza, Italy
- Party: Independent
- Education: University of Naples Federico II
- Profession: Prefect, state councillor

Luciana Lamorgese (born 11 September 1953) is an Italian civil servant and prefect who served as Minister of the Interior in the governments of Prime Ministers Giuseppe Conte and Mario Draghi from 2019 to 2022.

== Early life and career ==
Born in Potenza on 11 September 1953, Lamorgese graduated in law and qualified as a lawyer. In 1979, she began working for the Ministry of the Interior, becoming a vice prefect in 1994 and a prefect in 2003. She was prefect of Venice from 2010 to 2013, working alongside Giorgio Orsoni, the elected mayor.

In 2017, with the end of the Renzi government, Lamorgese became prefect in Milan, replacing Alessandro Maragoni in the post. On 13 November 2018 she was appointed as a state councillor by the Council of Ministers chaired by Giuseppe Conte, who was forming his first government.

== Minister of the Interior ==
=== Conte II Cabinet ===
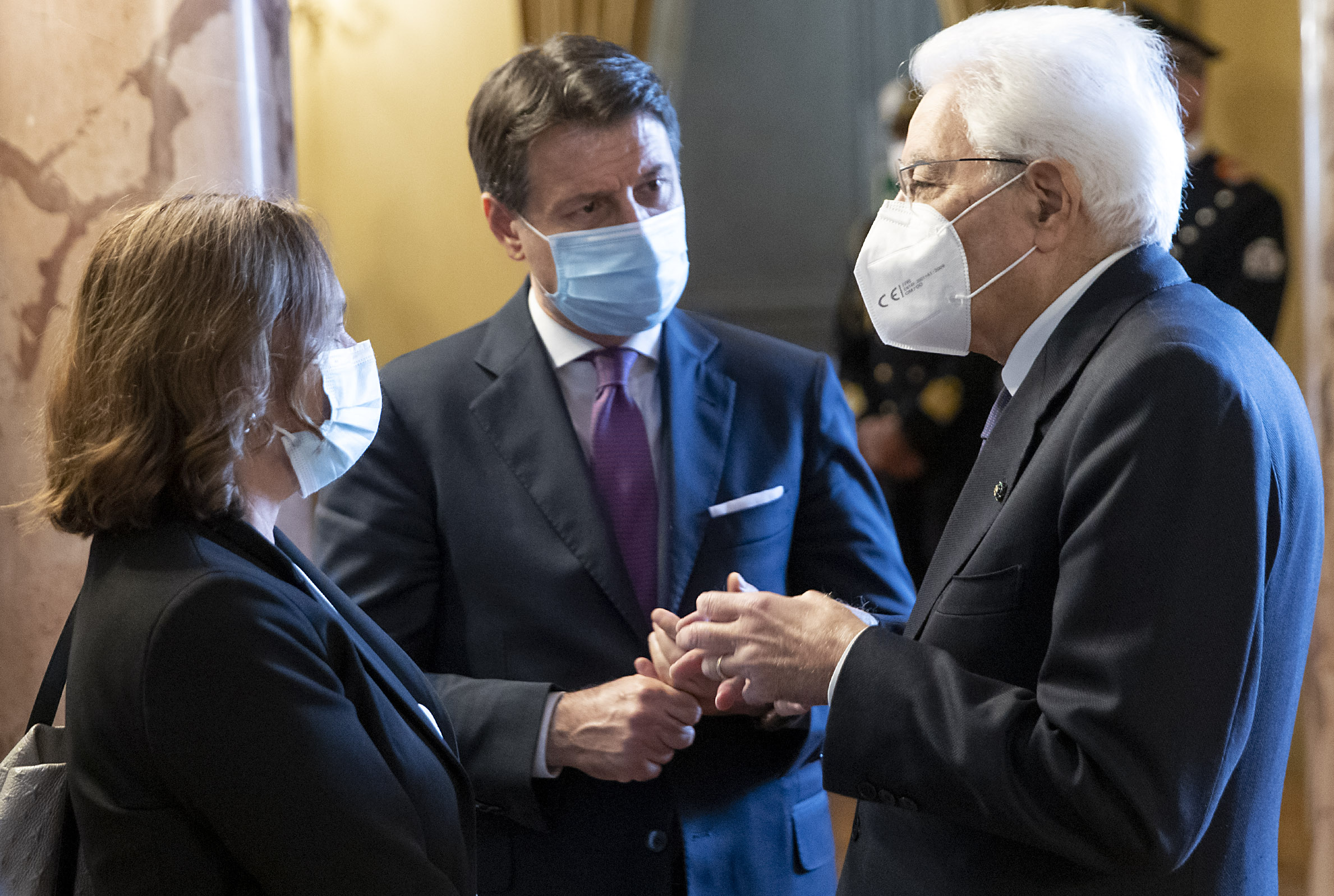
Lamorgese with President Sergio Mattarella and Prime Minister Giuseppe Conte in October 2020

In September 2019, with the collapse of Conte's and M5S's government alliance with Matteo Salvini, a new coalition was formed between the M5S and the centre-left Democratic Party and Free and Equal. She was picked as Minister of the Interior in the new government led again by Conte, and took office on 5 September.

Lamorgese has been in charge of the nationwide lockdown in response to the COVID-19 pandemic. On 7 December 2020 she tested positive for the disease herself.

=== Draghi Cabinet ===
On 12 February 2021, Lamorgese was re-appointed Minister of the Interior in the Draghi Cabinet. Shortly after taking office in September 2019, Lamorgese agreed with her counterparts from France, Germany, Malta, and Finland, which held the rotating presidency of the Council of the European Union at the time, on redistributing migrants on aid ships to some EU member states immediately following their rescue.

Under Lamorgese's leadership, the government approved a 2021 bill to tackle gender-based violence and strengthen surveillance on suspects, authorizing police to take action against suspects even if the victim herself does not report the offence – a move aimed at helping women who are afraid of filing formal accusations.
