= Matteo Piantedosi =

Italian civil servant and politician (born 1963)

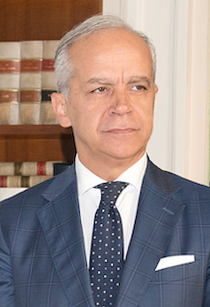
- Piantedosi in 2022

Minister of the Interior
- Incumbent
- Assumed office 22 October 2022
- Prime Minister: Giorgia Meloni
- Preceded by: Luciana Lamorgese

Personal details
- Born: 20 April 1963 (age 63) Naples, Italy
- Party: Independent (close to League)
- Height: 1.74 m (5 ft 9 in)
- Spouse: Paola Berardino
- Children: 2
- Education: University of Bologna
- Occupation: Civil servant, prefect, lawyer

Matteo Piantedosi (born 20 April 1963) is an Italian prefect and civil servant serving as the Minister of the Interior in the Meloni Cabinet since 22 October 2022. An independent politician, he is close to Lega leader Matteo Salvini.

He had previously been the prefect of the provinces of Lodi (2011–2012), Bologna (2017–2018) and Rome (2020–2022), as well as serving as chief of staff in the Ministry of the Interior under Salvini and later Luciana Lamorgese (2018–2020).

== Biography ==
=== Prefect and ministerial work ===
Piantedosi was born in Naples to a father who was a headmaster and a mother who was a teacher. He graduated in law from the University of Bologna. He began his career in the prefecture of the Province of Bologna, where he led its cabinet for eight years. In February 2007 he was appointed deputy prefect in the same prefecture until 2009, when he was called to the Ministry of the Interior to head the Parliamentary Relations office at the Legislative Affairs and Parliamentary Relations office.

In August 2011, Piantedosi was named prefect of the Province of Lodi, leaving at the turn of the year to return to the Ministry of the Interior. Since January 2012 he has been appointed Chief of Staff the Minister of the Interior and since June 2012 Deputy Chief of Deputy Cabinet. The Council of Ministers, on 16 November 2012, appointed him Deputy Director-General of Public Security for the coordination and planning of the Police Forces. From April 2014 until May 2017 he was also the Managing Authority of the National Operational Program "Security for Development-Convergence Objective 2007/2013", of the National Operational Program "Legality 2014/2020" and of the Complementary Operational Program for Programming 2014 /2020, and also the Responsible Authority of the "European Fund for External Borders 2007/2013" and of the "Internal Security Fund 2014/2020". In May 2017, he went back to the Province of Bologna as its prefect. A year later, he left this role and went back to the ministry, serving as Chief of Staff during the ministry of Matteo Salvini. Piantedosi remained in this position after Salvini was replaced by Luciana Lamorgese; he left in August 2020 to be prefect of the Metropolitan City of Rome Capital.

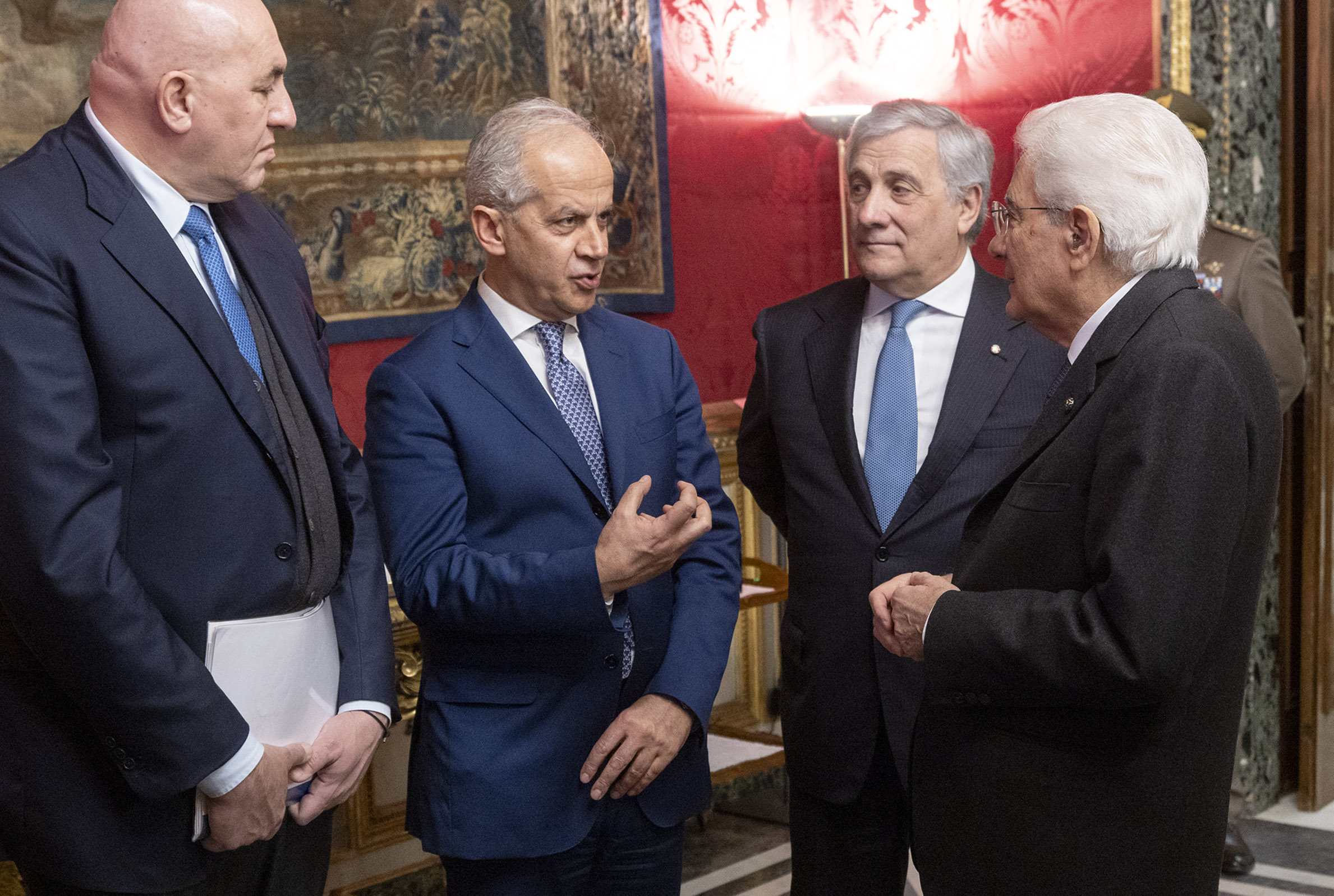
Piantedosi with president Sergio Mattarella and ministers Guido Crosetto and Antonio Tajani

During his time in Salvini's ministry, Piantedosi and the minister were indicted in 2019 over accusations of abuse of office for refusing to allow the passengers on the migrant boat Alan Kurdi to disembark in Italy. In November that year, the case against both men was closed, as the court ruled that no crime had been committed. It ruled that Italy was not the "first-contact country" required to take in the passengers, as the ship was registered in Germany.

=== Minister of the Interior ===
Piantedosi was named the Minister of the Interior in Giorgia Meloni's cabinet, which was sworn in on 22 October 2022.

Secretary Mayorkas Participates in a Bilateral Meeting with the Italian Minister of Interior Piantedosi in 2023

Less than 48 hours after his appointment as Minister of the Interior, Piantedosi enacted directives that prohibited the Ocean Viking and Humanity One NGO ships, which were carrying immigrants, from entering Italian ports. He also considered restoring Salvini's previous security decrees that included measures against illegal immigration, which had risen between 2021 and 2022.

This set of rules, aimed at a stronger regulation for NGO ships who try to bring migrants to Italian ports, was consequently summed up as the Piantedosi decree.

In July 2025, Piantedosi was among several European officials declared "persona non grata" by the Government of National Stability in eastern Libya after he and the said officials held an earlier meeting with officials of the rival Government of National Unity based in Tripoli.

== Personal life ==
Piantedosi is married to Paola Berardino, prefect of the Province of Grosseto, with whom he has two daughters. Though born in his mother's house in Naples, he was raised in his father's village of Pietrastornina in the Province of Avellino also in Campania, where he was given honorary citizenship and retains a house. He is a supporter of Bologna F.C. 1909.

== Honours ==
=== Orders ===
Award or decoration	Country	Date
Order of Merit of the Italian Republic	Italy	10 October 2016
