= Ministry of the Interior (Italy) =

Government ministry of Italy

- Ministero dell'Interno

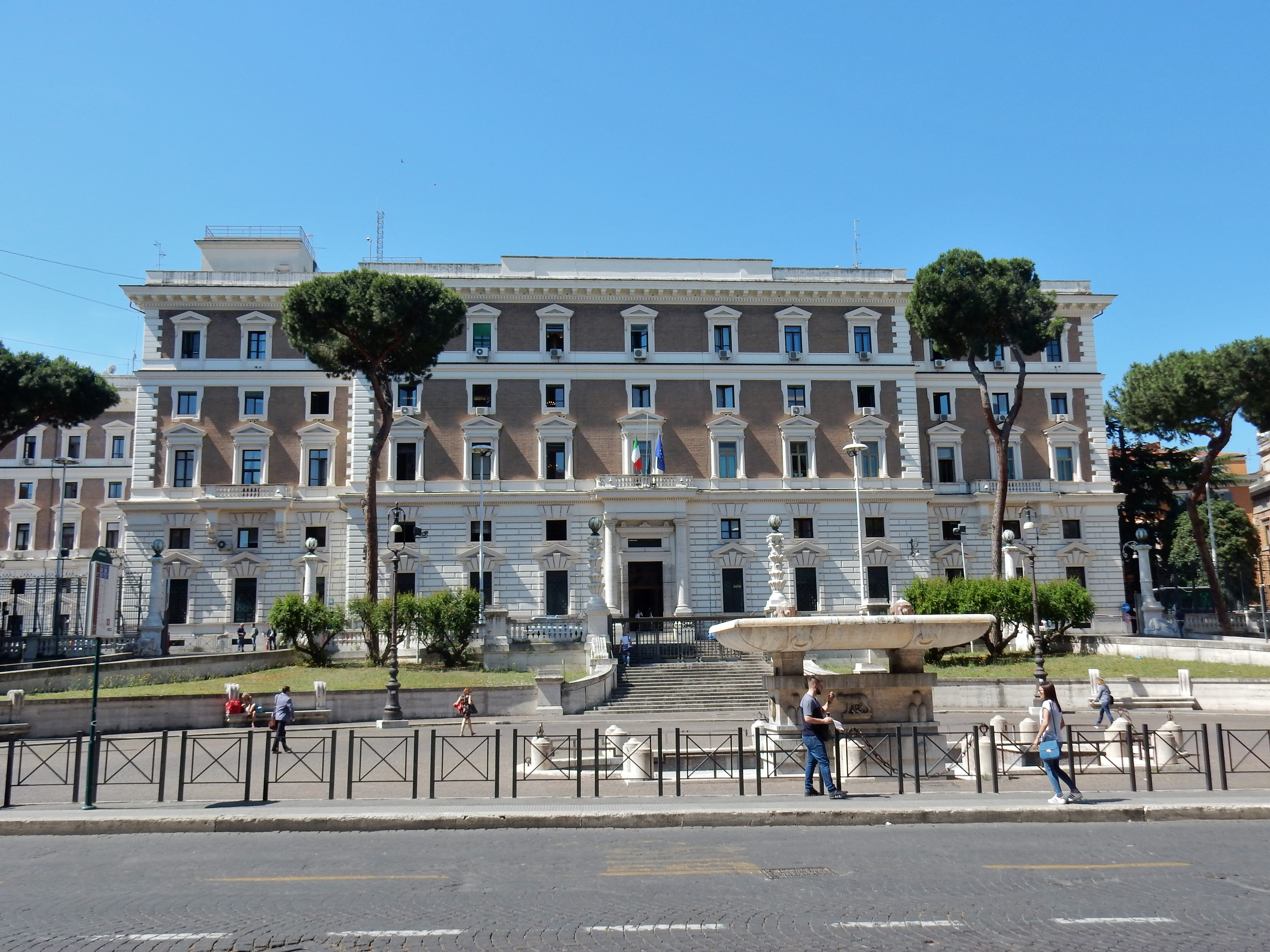
- Palazzo del Viminale, seat of the ministry

Agency overview
- Formed: 1861
- Jurisdiction: Government of Italy
- Headquarters: Palazzo del Viminale; Viminale Square, 1 - Rome
- Minister responsible: Matteo Piantedosi, Minister of the Interior
- Website: interno.gov.it

The Ministry of the Interior (Italian: Ministero dell'Interno) is a government agency of Italy, headquartered in Rome. It is a cabinet-level ministry of the Italian Republic. Since October 2022, the minister has been Matteo Piantedosi, former Prefect of Rome.

== Responsibilities ==
The ministry is responsible for internal security and the protection of the constitutional order, for civil protection against disasters and terrorism, for displaced persons and for administrative questions. It is host to the Standing Committee of Interior Ministers and also drafts all passport, identity card, firearms, and explosives legislation.

The Ministry of the Interior is the political authority for the administration of internal affairs. It controls the State Police (Polizia di Stato), the Fire Fighters Department (Vigili del Fuoco) and the Prefect The minister therefore sits on the High Council of Defence.

The main functions of the ministry are declared in the Executive Order No. 300, promulgated on the 30th of July 1999 and are as follows:

- Ensuring the regular organisation of the elected organs of the local entities and their correct functioning, regulating local finances and electoral services, looking after vital records and registry offices, and collaborating with local entities;
- Protection of public order and security and coordination of the police forces;
- General administration and general representation of the government in its territories;
- Protection of civil rights, including religious belief, citizenship, immigration, and asylum.

Currently, the Ministry's duties and powers are regulated by the Presidential decrees of 5 June 1976, no. 676 and 7 September 2001 no. 398.

== Organisation ==
The following departments, directorates, special commissions, and other offices and secretariats of the Ministry of Interior are as follows:

=== Departments ===
- Department of Public Security (Dipartimento della Pubblica sicurezza)
- Department for Internal and Territorial Affairs (Dipartimento per gli Affari interni e territoriali)
- Department for Civil Liberties and Immigration (Dipartimento per le Libertà civili e l'Immigrazione)
- Department of Fire Fighters, Emergencies and Civil Defence (Dipartimento dei Vigili del fuoco, del Soccorso pubblico e della Difesa civile)
- Department for Civil Servants Policies, Administration and Financial Resources (Dipartimento per le Politiche del personale dell'amministrazione civile e per le Risorse strumentali e finanziarie)

=== Collegial Bodies ===
- National Committee for Public Order and Security (Comitato nazionale dell'ordine e della sicurezza pubblica)
- Council of Administration (Consiglio di amministrazione)

=== Offices for the Direction of Collaboration ===
- Minister's Cabinet (Gabinetto Ministro)
- Office for Legislative Affairs and Parliamentary Relations (Ufficio affari legislativi e relazioni parlamentari)
- Independent Audit Body for Valuation of Performances (Organismo indipendente di valutazione della performance)
- Minister's Spokesperson Office (Portavoce del ministro)
- Press and Communications Office (Ufficio stampa e comunicazione)

=== Secretariats ===
- Minister's Secretariat (Segreteria del ministro)
- Deputy Minister's Secretariat (Segreteria del viceministro)
- Offices of Ministry of Interior Undersecretaries (Segreterie dei sottosegretari)

=== Special Commissions ===
- Special Commission for Anti-Racketeering and Anti-Usury (Commissario straordinario antiracket e antiusura)
- Special Commission for Missing Persons (Commissario straordinario per le persone scomparse)
- Coordinating Commission for Solidarity to Victims of Mafia Crimes (Commissario per il coordinamento delle iniziative di solidarietà per le vittime dei reati di tipo mafioso)

== History ==
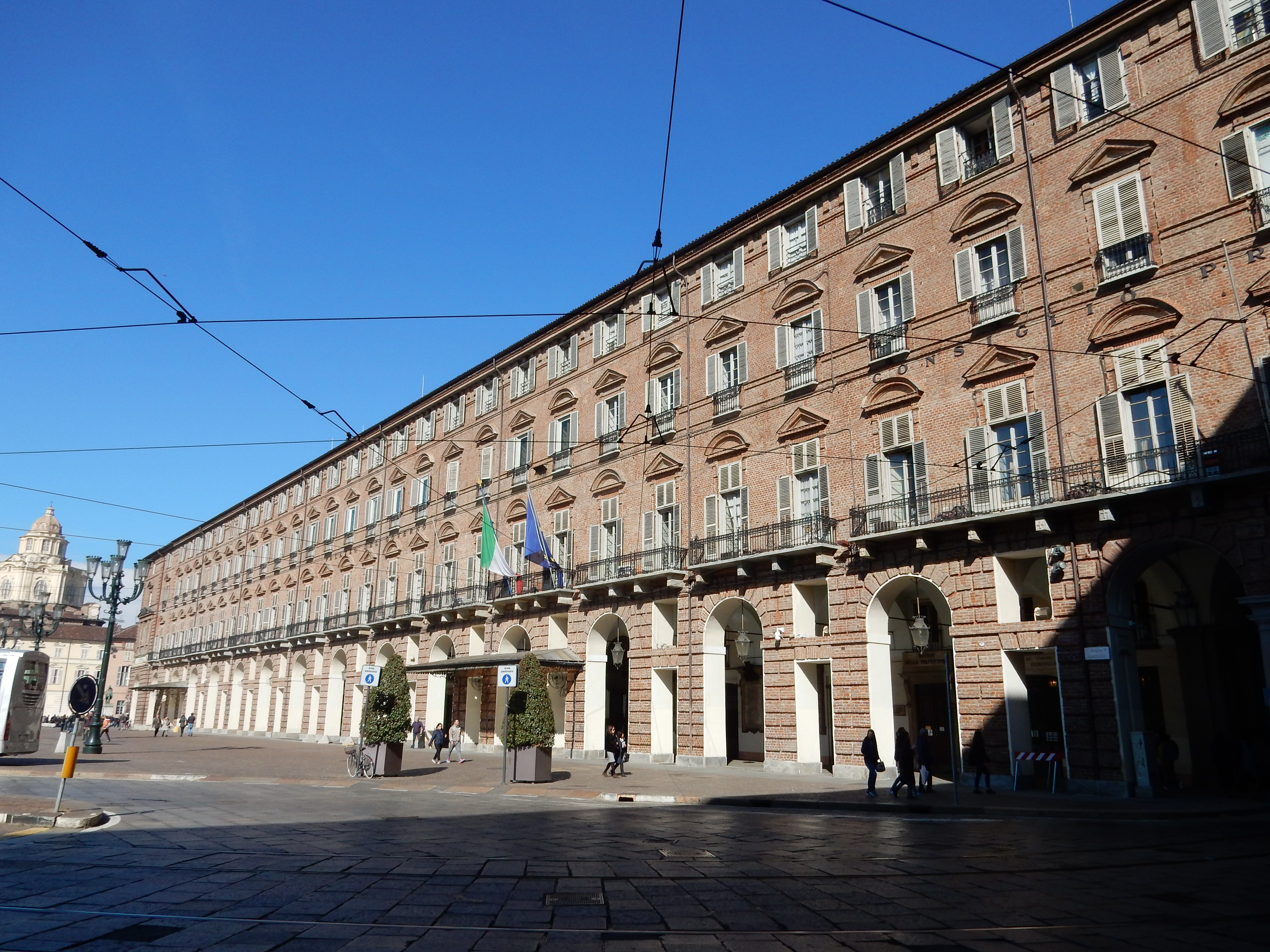
Palazzo delle Segreterie, in Turin; first seat of the Ministry of the Interior of the Italian State (until 1865) and now the headquarters of the Prefecture

The Ministry of the Interior was among the oldest ministries of the Kingdom of Sardinia. It experienced a notable growth in responsibilities from 1861, as a result of the Unification of Italy. As a result of the absence of any kind of Head of Government from the Albertine Statute, the Ministry of the Interior had priority over the Presidency of the Council from the beginning. During the establishment of the unitary state, the Minister of the Interior represented a strongly centralised model of state, desired by the Piedmontese statesmen in order to strengthen the state which they saw as excessively diverse. Along with the Ministry of Finance, the Ministry of the Interior was one of the two pillars on which Italian national unity was built.

The functions of the Ministry were executed by a system of prefectures, based on the French model, with provincial seats whose authority derived from the central government. The attributes of the prefect were intended by the liberal Historical Right government to unify Italy. It was Minister Bettino Ricasoli who initiated this policy of marked centralisation in 1861 with the "Decrees of October." In the first decades of the Kingdom of Italy's existence, the Prefectures gave the government tight control over local affairs, representing the central government locally. In many areas of Italy, the Prefectures were the only offices of the central government.

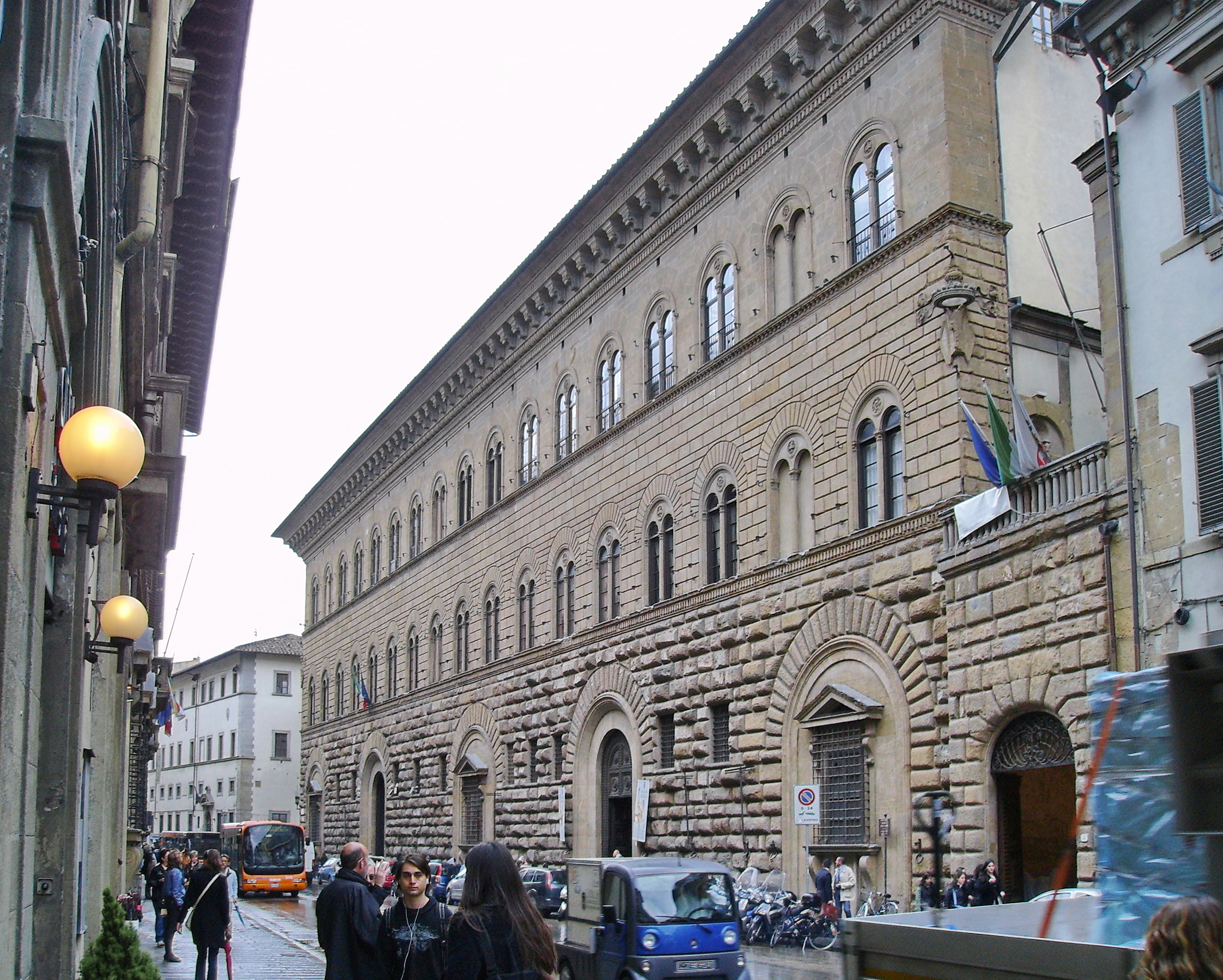
Palazzo Medici Riccardi, in Florence, seat of the Ministry from 1865 to 1871; now seat of the provincial government

The Ministry was reorganised in 1870 by Minister Giovanni Lanza and again in 1874 and 1877, under the first government of the left wing of the Liberal Party. During these years, the Ministry acquired control of the police (separate from the judicial police), prisons, and social policing (meaning offices of public health). Towards the end of the 19th century, Minister Francesco Crispi strengthened the ministry and the prefectures. Subsequently, Minister Antonio di Rudinì decentralised some functions, entrusting various roles to the prefectures which had previously been the responsibility of the Ministry itself.

Under Giovanni Giolitti, in the early twentieth century, the Ministry became the key means of state action. It exercised watchful and strict control over the comuni and provinces, especially in matters of public order. In the arena of public health, it enforced a rationalisation of health laws in 1913, with the so-called "Sanitary Codex". In the social sphere, the prefectures were called upon to mediate in labour conflicts and improve working conditions, in collaboration with the government labour office, and to "municipalise" essential services like tramlines, streetlighting, kindergartens, etc. In this area too, their powers and administrative role expanded.

Although the Ministry continued its ordinary role in maintaining security, order and health during the First World War, its overall structure was not significantly modified. With the rise of Italian Fascism, there was little change. An exception is Law no.1601 of 3 December 1922, which transferred the General Directorate of Prisons and Rehabilitation to the Ministry of Mercy, Justice, and Worship. In general, Benito Mussolini controlled the ministry personally, but it progressively lost its guiding role in the administration of the state.

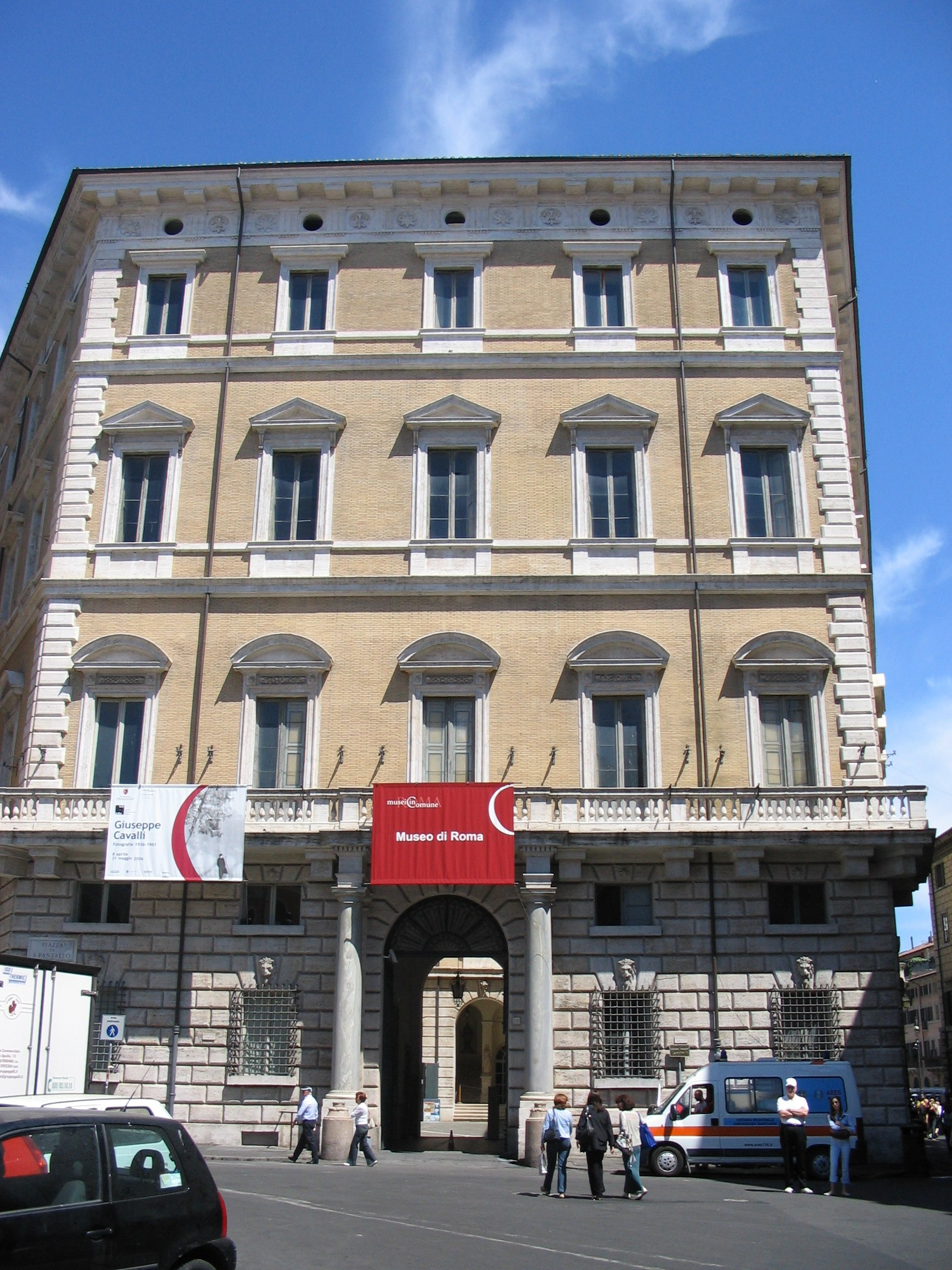
Palazzo Braschi in Rome, seat of the Ministry of the Interior from 1871 to 1925, now the site of a museum

In 1931, the General Directorate of Support for Worship and of Support for Charity and Religion of the City of Rome, as well as the General Directorate of Religious Affairs, which had previously belonged to the Ministry of Mercy and Justice, were entrusted to the Ministry of the Interior. These offices are still part of the Ministry of the Interior.

After the fall of Fascism, institutional changes resulted from the creation of the Republic of Italy. The main theme of these changes was the increased decentralisation of power to the Regions and the progressive transfer of competencies from the Ministry of the Interior to them over the course of the 1960s.

The main role of the Ministry also changed or rather reverted to the role it had had under Giolitti decades earlier. Its role in social protection was reinforced and, along with the Ministry of Labour, it played a key role in welfare politics, providing support to the socially disadvantaged and guaranteeing protection in the event of disaster.

The important sphere of public health was removed from the control of the Ministry in 1958, with the institution of the Ministry of Health. With the creation of the Ministry for Cultural Assets and Environments, the Ministry of the Interior lost control of the Archive of State. In the 1980s, the Department of Civil Protection was created, which is headed by an independent Minister without portfolio, but is based on the organisation of the Ministry

There was also a reorganisation of the centralised structure of the Ministry and the number of General Directorates declined from even to five. Moreover, with Law no. 121/1981, the Polizia di Stato was reformed and transformed from the General Directorate of Public Security into a department. This anticipated the future departmental structure of the ministry as a whole.

In the 1990s, the Bassanini Reforms involved a complex process of reorganisation of the administrative structure of the Ministry. In particular, Decree Law no.300/1999 dealt with the creation of a departmental structure for the Ministry. Additionally, the prefecture system was overhauled and they were renamed "Government Territorial Prefecture Offices." Since the completion of these reforms, the Ministry has had authority over "general" administration, including relationships between centre and periphery, and particularly for the protection of fundamental functions and the security of citizens.

== Headquarters ==
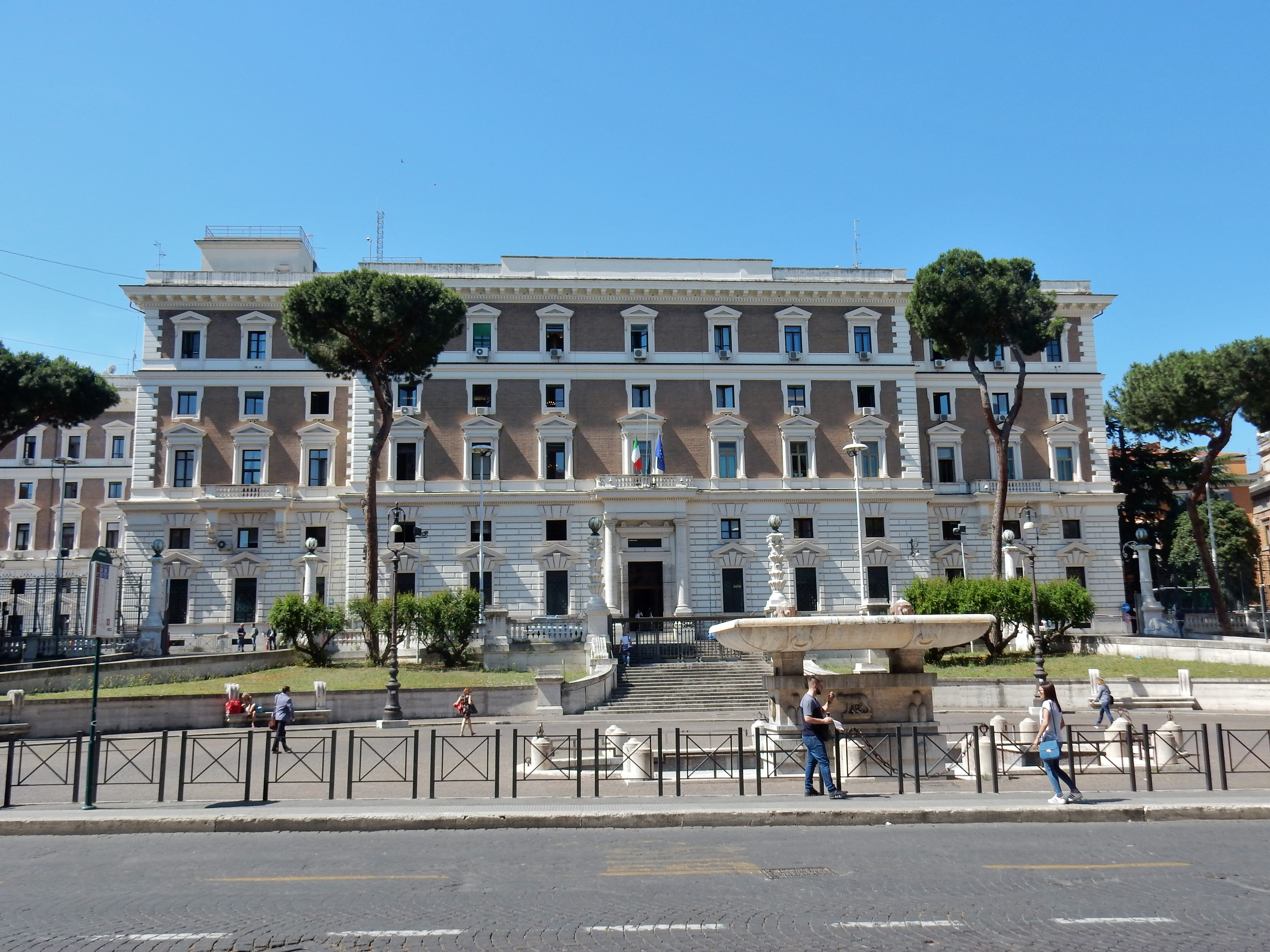
Palazzo del Viminale

The Ministry of the Interior has been based in Rome at the Palazzo del Viminale since 1925. Before that, the Ministry, as well as the office of the Prime Minister, were based at the Palazzo Braschi. The Viminale was commissioned in 1911 by Giovanni Giolitti. The architect was Manfredo Manfredi, who was instructed to design a fitting structure for a government headquarters. The Viminale was officially inaugurated on 9 July 1925. The building has five stories and hundreds of rooms linked by a series of hallways. Notable aspects include the imposing triple arched entrance of the Palazzo della Presidenza, the staircase of honour of the Palazzo degli Uffici, the chamber of the Council of Ministers, and entrance to the stairway leading to the piano nobile, with wooden, marble, and stucco decoration.

In 1961, the headquarters of the Office of Prime Minister was separated from the Ministry of the Interior and transferred to Palazzo Chigi, where it remains today.
