= Palazzo del Viminale =

Building in Rome, Italy

Palazzo del Viminale Ministry of Interior of Italian Republic
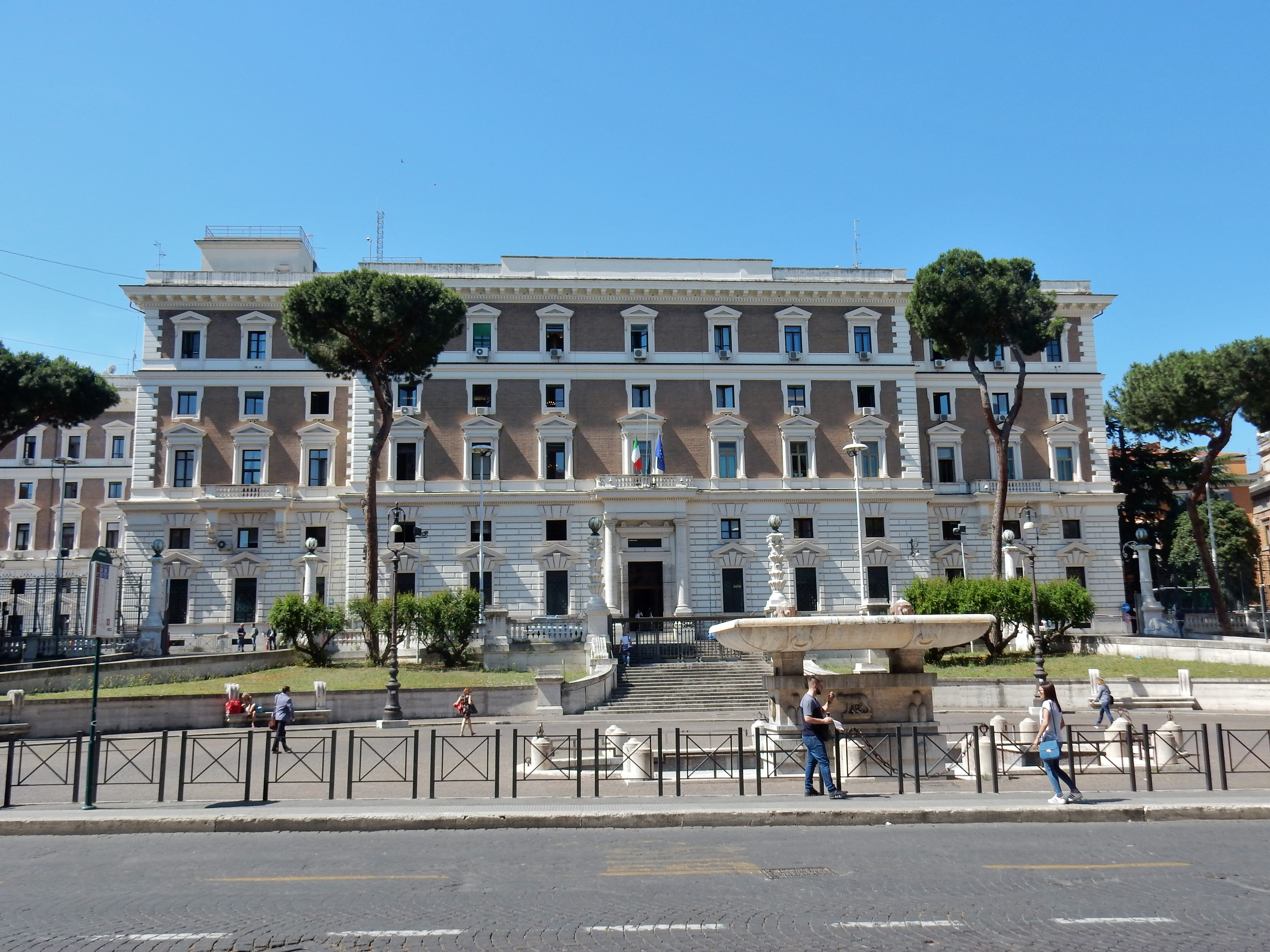
- Ministry of the Interior (Italy)
- Click on the map for a fullscreen view

General information
- Location: Rome, Italy
- Coordinates: 41.8992°N 12.4935°E
- Construction started: 1911
- Completed: 1925

Design and construction
- Architect: Manfredo Manfredi

The Palazzo del Viminale is a historic palace in Rome (Italy), seat of the Prime Minister and of the Ministry of Interior since 1925; in 1961 the Prime Minister was transferred to Palazzo Chigi.

== History ==
The palace was commissioned by Giovanni Giolitti, who conceived it as the nerve centre of Italian Executive (at that time the office of Prime Minister and Interior Minister were fulfilled by a single person).

The palace was designed in 1911 by the architect Manfredo Manfredi and was officially inaugurated on July 9, 1925.

== Description ==
The Palazzo is 5 floors high with hundreds of rooms, linked each other by a series of crossed itineraries. The imposing three-arched entrance of the Palazzo della Presidenza, the staircase of honor of the Palazzo degli Uffici, the room of the Council of Ministers and the entrance hall of the staircase at the piano nobile, with its wood, marble and stucco decorations, are especially noteworthy.

The boardrooms of the Minister are placed in a side complex, linked to the main building by an arched junction.

The gardens and the terraces are overbuilt and abut onto the surrounding streets, standing out of the road surface.

== Science ==
The back gardens separate the main complex from smaller buildings. In fact, almost opposite to the back façade there is the little palace that housed the Royal Institute for Physics, in which Enrico Fermi carried out his experiments together with the Via Panisperna boys (so called because the little palace is closer to the exit on Via Panisperna). The palace also housed the Royal Institute for Chemistry.

== Libraries ==
The main building houses many libraries:

- the Libreria Centrale al Viminale
- the Biblioteca della Direzione Centrale per l'Amministrazione del Fondo Edifici di Culto
- the Biblioteca della Scuola Superiore dell'Amministrazione dell'Interno
- the Biblioteca della Direzione Centrale per la Documentazione e la statistica

It also houses bank branches, post offices and many coffee shops.

| Preceded by Palazzo Vidoni-Caffarelli | Landmarks of Rome; Palazzo del Viminale | Succeeded by Palazzo Wedekind |
