= Maria Santissima Annunziata, Comiso =

Church in Italy

Coordinates: 36.°N 14.°E

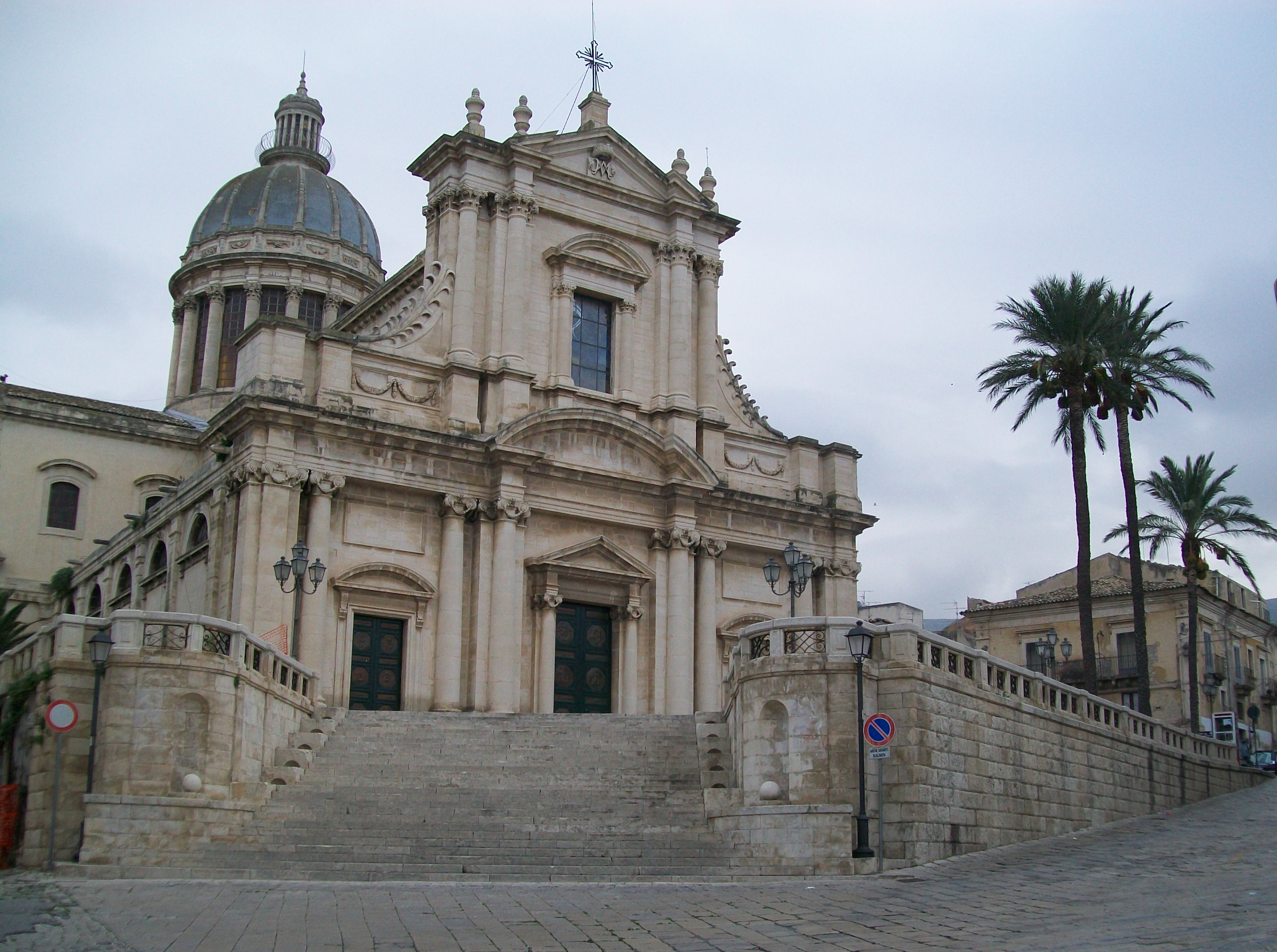
Facade of church

Chiesa di Maria Santissima Annuziata (Church of the Holiest Mary of the Annunciation) is a Roman Catholic parish and minor basilica church located in the city of Comiso, in the province of Ragusa, Italy. The church is dedicated to the Marian devotion of the Virgin of the Annunciation.

== History ==
A church at this site, dedicated to San Nicola of Bari, was the original mother church of the town, and dated to prior than the mid-15th century, when the title was switched in 1480 to Santa Maria delle Stelle, because this parish, serving the local Greek population, persisted in using eastern Greek orthodox liturgy. This original church was razed by the 1693 Sicily earthquake.

It was rebuilt by 1772 in the same site, but re-dedicated to the Virgin Mary. The design is attributed to Giovanni Battista Cascione Vaccarini, grandson of Giovanni Battista Vaccarini. The elegant Baroque white stone facade has a two-story central nave linked with volutes to the aisles, each with doors decorated with bronze bas-reliefs. The superior tympanum has a crown and the monogram of Maria Annuziata.

The interior has altarpieces depicting:

- Assumption of Mary (1505) (signed “Guidinius Narcusius (xit)”)
- Presentation of Mary at the Temple (1545) by A. Lo Blanco
- An Annunciation (17th-century) attributed to Carlo Dolci
- Prayer of St John (17th-century) by Mario Minniti
- San Gaetano Thiene (17th-century) by Vito D’Anna

Additionally, there is a canvas depicting the Souls in Purgatory (1857) by the Vaccaro brothers. The frescoes of the apse and cupola (1887) were painted by C. La Leta and M. Sparavilla. A 17th-century crucifix is attributed to Frate Umile da Petralia. A stucco statuary group depicting the Mourning at the Deposition (1751) was made by S. Alessi. The Baptistery (1913) in white marble and bronze is by Mario Rutelli.
