= Monument to Terenzio Mamiani, Rome =

Statue in Rome

Coordinates: 41.89980°N 12.46571°E

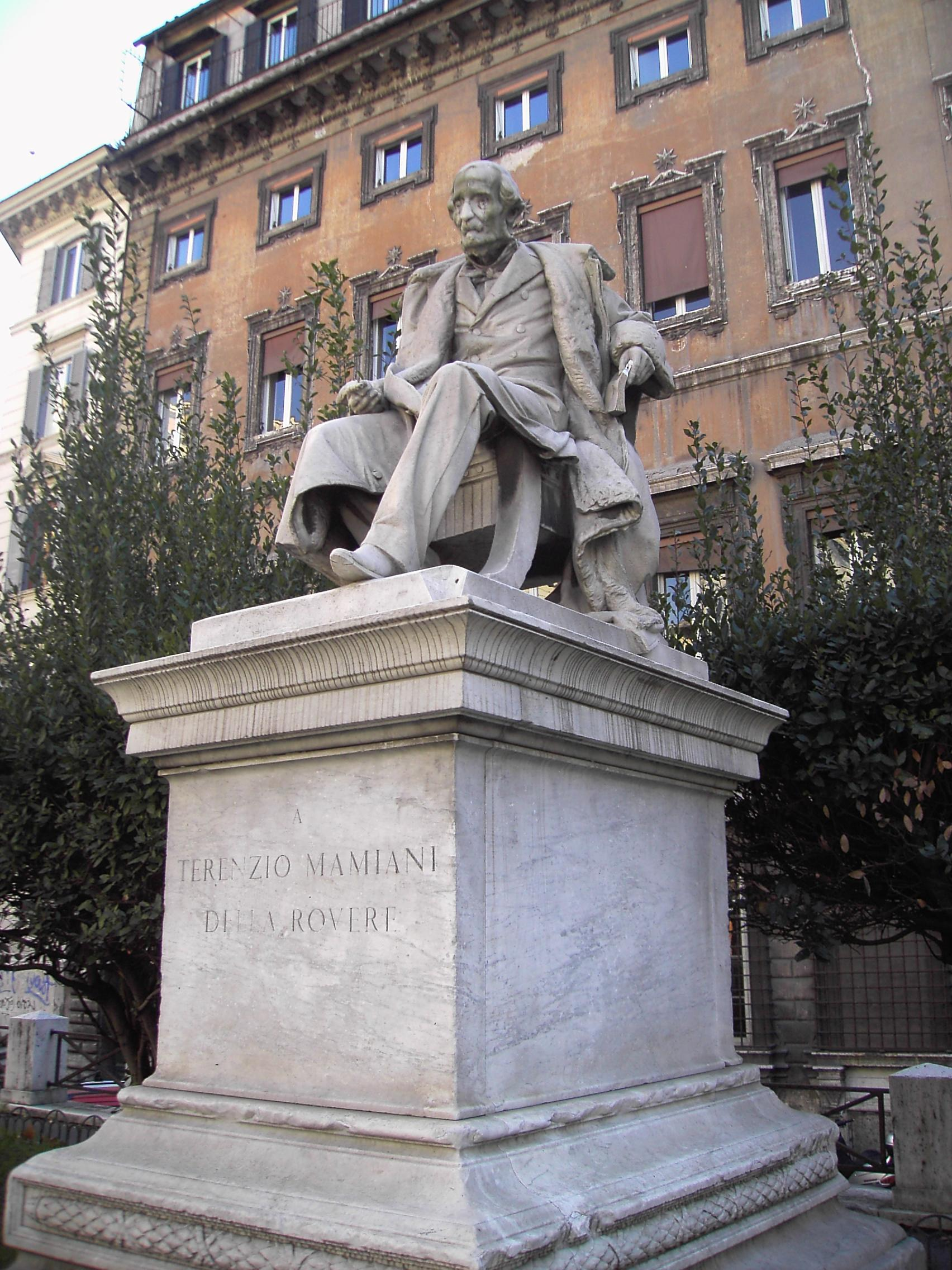
- Interactive map of Monument to Terenzio Mamiani, Rome
- Location: Rome, Italy
- Designer: Mauro Benini
- Type: Statue
- Material: Carrara marble
- Dedicated date: 2 March 1893
- Dedicated to: Terenzio Mamiani della Rovere

The Monument to Terenzio Mamiani della Rovere is a memorial statue to an 18th-century patriot and statesman, located alongside the Corso Vittorio Emanuele II at a small piazza along Via degli Acciaioli. Mamiani (1799–1885) was in life a liberal Catholic, and posthumously acknowledged as having been a free-mason: his service as both minister in the Papal States and under the Kingdom of Sardinia, later Senator in the Kingdom of Italy bridged contentious or warring factions.

The City Council of Rome approved the construction of the statue, at a cost of 10,000 lire, on 25 May 1885, four days after his death. In 1889, it was decided to place the statue in the Piazza Sforza Cesarini, some four blocks southeast of the present position, alongside the Corso. The design of a monument by Mauro Benini was chosen by a committee led by the sculptor and council-member Ettore Ferrari. The ultimate cost was over 20,000 lire and paid out in various installments:

- 3000 lire paid for the initial design paid to Benini
- 4000 lire paid for a clay-plaster model
- 5000 lire paid for completion of the statue
- 7000 lire paid for the completion of the monument in situ
- 1000 lire for complete assembly

The statue was inaugurated on 2 March 1893, in a ceremony attended by Terenzio's widow, Angela Mamiani della Rovere.

During his life, Terenzio had published a work examining and praising of Nicola Spedalieri's opus Il Diritti dell'Uomo. Thus perhaps it is ironic that by 1927, another council in Rome decided to move Spedalieri's statue and monument from a busy street-piazza lot between the Palazzo Vidoni and Sant'Andrea della Valle, and place it in Piazza Sforza Cesarini, dislocating Terenzio to his present spot along Via degli Acciaioli.

The statue in Carrara marble depicts the elder gaunt Terenzio, seated but alert and leaning forward, with a quill pen in his right hand, and a book in his left hand.
