= Nicola Spedalieri =

Italian priest, theologian, and philosopher

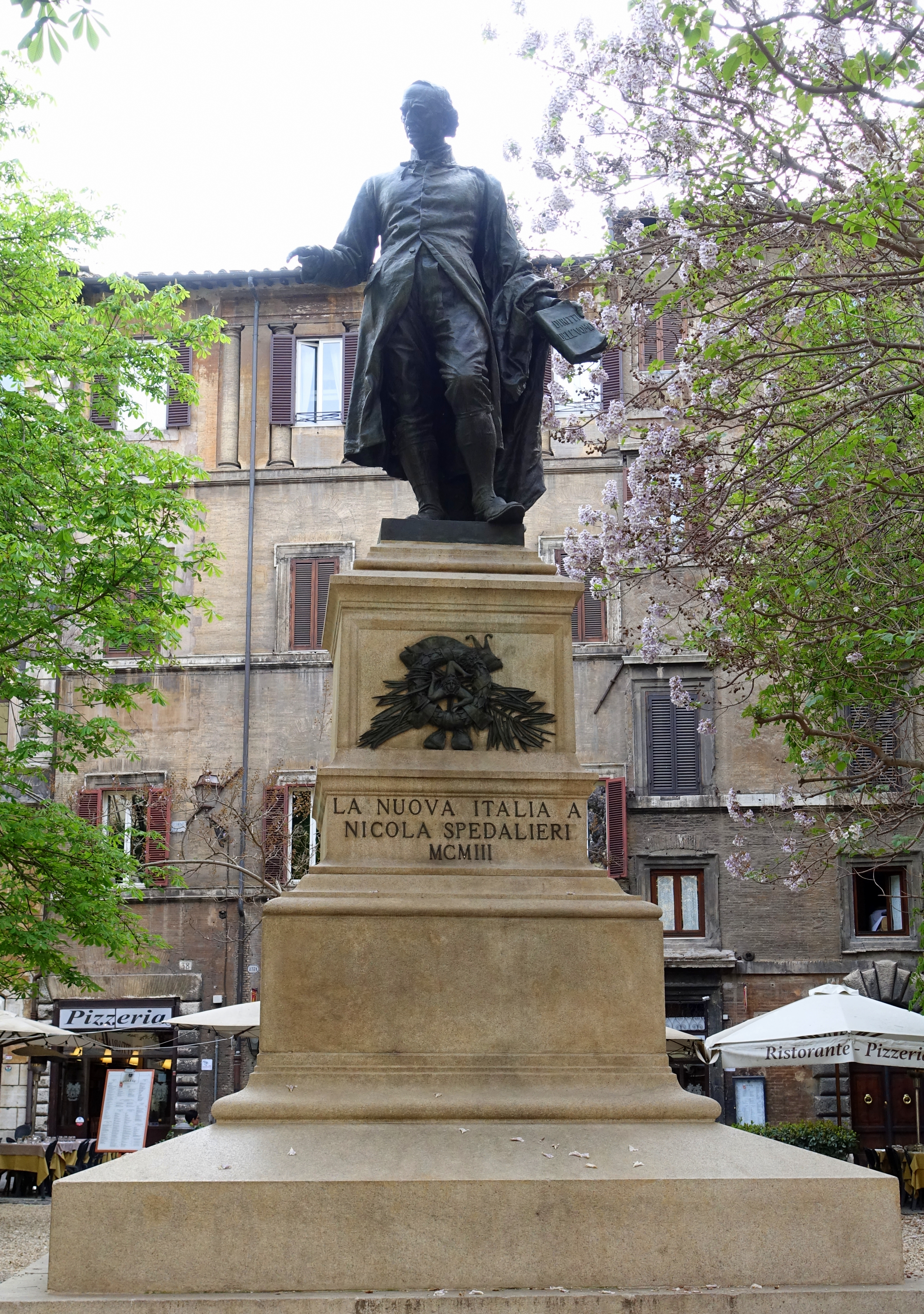
- Monument to Nicola Spedalieri by Mario Rutelli, Piazza Sforza Cesarini, Rome, Italy, 1903, bronze.
- Born: Nicola Illuminato Vincenzo Giacomo Spitaleri; 6 December 1740; Bronte, Kingdom of Sicily
- Died: 26 November 1795 (aged 54); Rome, Papal States
- Parent(s): Vincenzo Spitaleri and Antonina Spitaleri (née Dinaro)

Philosophical work
- Era: Counter-Enlightenment
- Region: Western philosophy
- Notable works: Dei diritti dell'uomo libri VI

Nicola Spedalieri (né Spitaleri, born at Bronte, Catania, Sicily, 6 December 1740; died at Rome, 26 November 1795) was an Italian priest, theologian, and philosopher.

== Life ==
He studied and was ordained a priest in the seminary of Monreale, then among the most prominent in Sicily. In Monreale, he was appointed professor of philosophy and mathematics, and later of theology. At the same time, he cultivated the arts of poetry, music, and painting. Disgusted at the opposition stirred up by certain theological theses, which were branded as heretical at Palermo, but approved at Rome, he withdrew from Monreale to Rome (1773 or 1774), where for ten years, while although leading a penurious life, he participated in fruitful study and labour. However, he always retained his affection for the seminary of Monreale.

In 1784, he obtained from Pope Pius VI a benefice in the Vatican Basilica, granting him a subsistance. and then ceased the efforts he had made for years to obtain a chair in the Universities of Pisa, Pavia, and Turin. His nephew, Arcangiolo Spedalieri, was a noted academic physician who became professor of comparative physiology at Pavia.

== Works ==
His first published work (1778 Rome) was Analisi dell'Esame critico di Fréret ("Examen critique des apologies de la religion chrétienne", a work wrongly attributed to Fréret, really written by Naigeon). In 1779, he published "Ragionamento sopra l'arte di governare" and "Ragionamento sull' influenza della religione cristiana sulla società civile". In 1784, he issued, also at Rome, his "Confutazione di Gibbon", in which he refutes the thesis of Edward Gibbon, who claimed Christianity was the main cause of the downfall of the Roman Empire. In it, as in the Apology against Fréret, he argues the benefits conferred by the Christian religion on the social and political order, including the role of Christianity as a powerful bulwark against despotism.

In 1791, from Rome, Spedalieri published his best known work: "I diritti dell' uomo" (The Rights of Man); this was intended as a Catholic response to the proclamation of the French "Rights of Man" proclamation from 1789. Notwithstanding the hearty reception given to this work by Pius VI who said, "For a long while rulers have been asking quid est papa. Your book will teach them quid est populus", a storm of criticism and refutation burst on the head of its author. Its theses raised objections among monarchical governments: for example, the Kingdom of Piedmont forbade its circulation. The controversy continued even after Spedalieri's death. In his book, except in certain details, Spedalieri expressed in the language of 18th-century enlightment the idea that political sovereignty derives from the people, an idea common to Catholic teachings from Aquinas to Suárez and Bellarmine. While for Spedalieri this did not exclude the divine origin of the same sovereignty, this thesis was not acceptable to the theories of royal absolutism, Regalism, and Cartesian dualism then in vogue, which did not admit the existence of a natural moral law but made all depend on the arbitrary Will of God. Thus, Spedalieri's thesis was seen to buttress the rising revolutionary ideas.

In the next century, both liberals and republicans claimed Spedalieri as an early supporter of their political theories; although the reality would have been more complex. The controversies about Spedalieri were renewed on the occasion of the centenary of his death.

Shortly before his death, he completed a Storia delle Paludi Pontine, a book Pius VI ordered him to write and which was published by his intimate friend Nicola Maria Nicolai, in the work "De' bonificamenti delle terre pontine" (Rome, 1800). His death, by some, was attributed to poison; a modern writer has not hesitated to lay the blame on the Jesuits, forgetting that Spedalieri's enemies were the bitterest adversaries of the Jesuits.

== Bibliography ==
- Pisanò, Attilio (2006). Aspetti del pensiero giusfilosofico di Nicola Spedalieri. Milan: Giuffrè. ISBN 978-8-81-413004-5.
- Borchi, Nicolas (2007). "Il "propositionum theologicarum specimen" di Nicola Spedalieri: critiche e censura fra Monreale, Parigi e Roma nella lotta per l'insegnamento della "sana dottrina" nei seminari". Studia patavina: Rivista di scienze religiose. 54 (2). Rome: Edizioni di storia e letteratura: 347–372. ISSN 0039-3304.
- Costanzo, Giuseppe (2014). "Diritti dell'uomo e società nel pensiero politico di Nicola Spedalieri". Christianitas: Rivista di Storia, Pensiero e Cultura del Cristianesimo. 3 (1). Rome: Edizioni di storia e letteratura. doi:10.1400/224671. ISSN 2281-7093.
- Matarazzo, Pasquale (2018). "La più sicura custode dei diritti dell'uomo: apologetica e politica in Nicola Spedalieri". Il Settecento e la religione. Rome: Edizioni di storia e letteratura. pp. 329–342. doi:10.1400/269914. ISBN 978-88-9359-221-5.
