= Terenzio, Count Mamiani della Rovere =

19th-century Italian diplomat, writer and politician

Terenzio Mamiani della Rovere
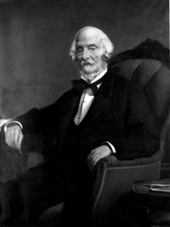
- Count Terenzio Mamiani della Rovere

Personal details
- Born: 27 September 1799 Pesaro
- Died: 21 May 1885 (aged 85) Roma

Terenzio, Count Mamiani della Rovere (19 September 1799 – 21 May 1885) was an Italian writer, academic, diplomat and politician, and was committed to the cause of the unification of Italy under the Sardinian monarchy. He was one of the leading figures of Liberal Catholicism.

== Origins ==
He was born in Pesaro in 1799 during the Napoleonic upheaval in territory that had since 1631 belonged to the Papal States, but had earlier in its history been dominated for a time by the clan Della Rovere. He himself became the last to hold the title Count of Sant'Angelo in Lizzola.

== Political Involvement ==
He took part in the unrest at Bologna (also part of the Papal States) in reaction to the election of Pope Gregory XVI in February 1831, and was elected deputy for Pesaro to the assembly, and subsequently appointed minister of the interior; but on the collapse of the revolutionary movement he was exiled. He did not return to Italy with the amnesty that was offered upon the accession of Pope Pius IX in 1846, because he refused to sign the declaration of loyalty that was required as a condition of the amnesty. Pressure by the revolutionaries of 1848 forced the Pope to allow the Count to return to Rome to form a ministry on 4 May 1848, but he resigned later that year due to conflicts with the Pope.

He subsequently retired to Genoa where he worked for Italian unification, was elected deputy in 1856, and in 1860 became minister of education of the Kingdom of Sardinia under Cavour. In 1863 he was made minister (ambassador) of the recently declared Kingdom of Italy to Greece, and in 1865 to Switzerland, and later senator and councillor of state.

He retires from diplomatic career in 1867.

== Academic works ==
Meanwhile, he had founded at Genoa in 1849 the Academy of Philosophy, and in 1855 had been appointed professor of the history of philosophy at Turin; and he published several volumes, not only on philosophical and social subjects, but of poetry, among them Rinnovamento della filosofia antica italiana (1836), Teoria della Religione e dello slato (1869), Kant e l'ontologia (1879), Religione deli avenire (1880), Di un nuovo diritto europeo (1843, 1857). He died at Rome on 21 May 1885.

== Legacy ==
On 15 August 1896, in connection with the solemn commemoration of Mamiani decreed by the city of Pesaro, the "11 September 1860" Masonic Lodge made public his membership of freemasonry and on 20 August that year had affixed to his monument a bronze crown with the wording "To Brother Terenzio Mamiani, the Freemasonry of Italy".

Another Monument to Terenzio Mamiani is located alongside the Corso Vittorio Emanuele II, Rome and via Acciaioli in central Rome.

== Honors ==
Grand cordon of the Order of Saints Maurice and Lazarus
