= Arcangiolo Spedalieri =

Italian physician (1779–1823)

Arcangiolo Spedalieri (1779–1823) was an Italian academic medical doctor, who served as professor of anatomy and comparative physiology at Pavia and published on the topic.

== Biography ==
Born in Bronte, Sicily, he was the nephew of the liberal priest and political philosopher Nicola Spedalieri. Arcangiolo studied in Naples. During the revolution of 1799, he was forced to find asylum in Bologna, where he briefly served as a professor of clinical medicine. He then moved to work in Pavia under Giuseppe Jacopi (1779–1813), as professor of anatomy and comparative physiology at the University of Pavia. He died in Alcamo, Sicily, in 1823. His main published works are Memorie di fisiologia e di patologia vegetabile (1806, Milan) and Medicinae praxos compendium (1815, Pavia).
