= Santa Maria delle Stelle, Comiso =

Church in Italy

Coordinates: 36.°N 14.°E

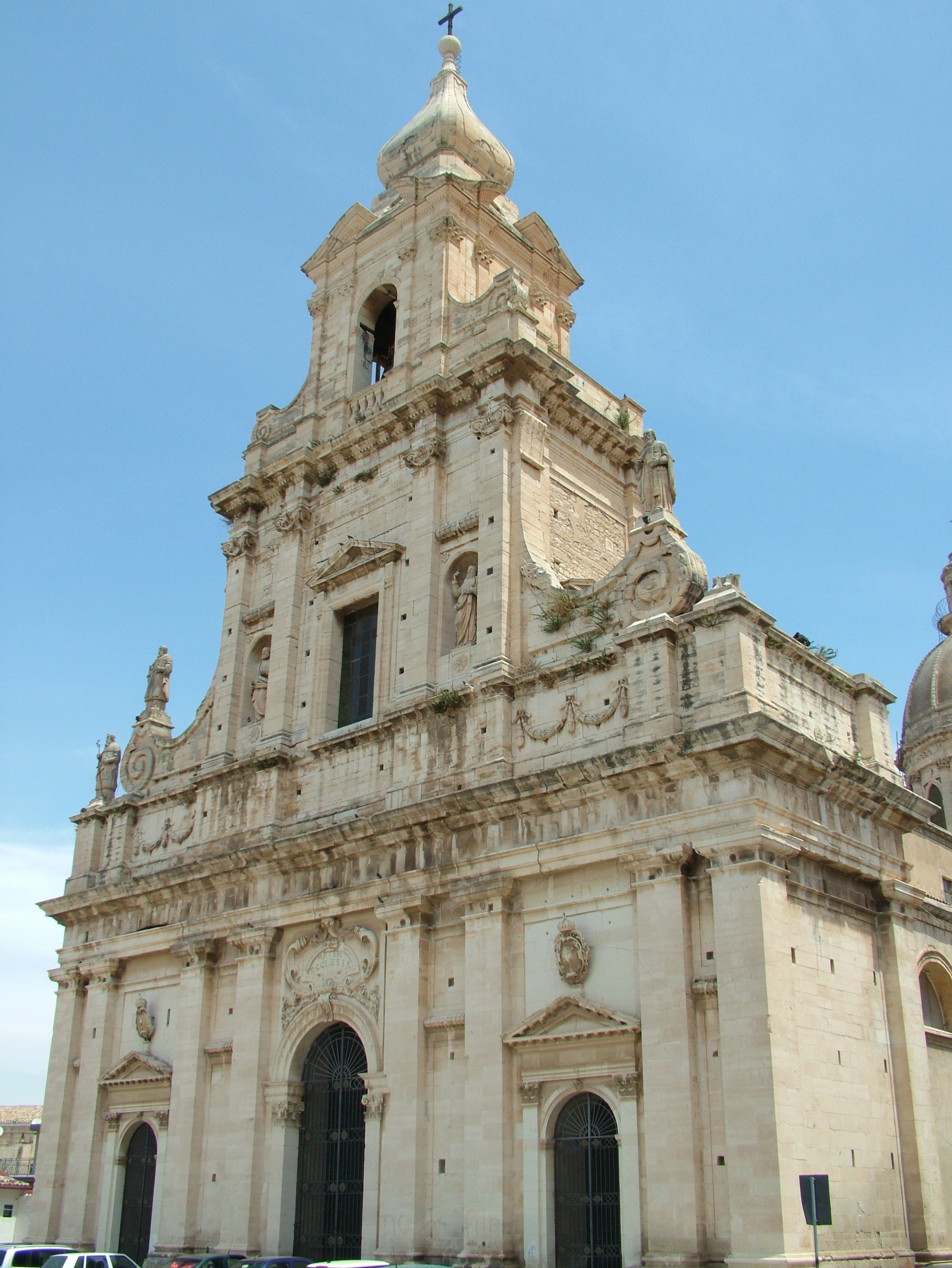
Facade of church with part of transept dome on the right

Santa Maria delle Stelle (Holy Mary of the Stars) is a Roman Catholic mother church of the city of Comiso, in the province of Ragusa, Italy. The church is dedicated to the Marian devotion of the Virgin of the Annunciation.

== History ==
A church at this site, was built in the 15th century near the Fountain of Diana. Rebuilt in the 15th century, it was again razed by the 1693 Sicily earthquake. It was quickly rebuilt using designs by Rosario Gagliardi under the patronage of Count Baldassarre V, and consecrated in 1699. The central portal has a plaque spelling Mater Ecclesia (Mother Church). The three-story white stone Baroque facade is rich in pilasters, and the second story has four statues of saints. The center belltower is surmounted by an onion dome. The sculptor E. Lucenti played a role in its decoration.
