= Fountain of the Naiads =

Fountain in Rome, Italy

- Fountain
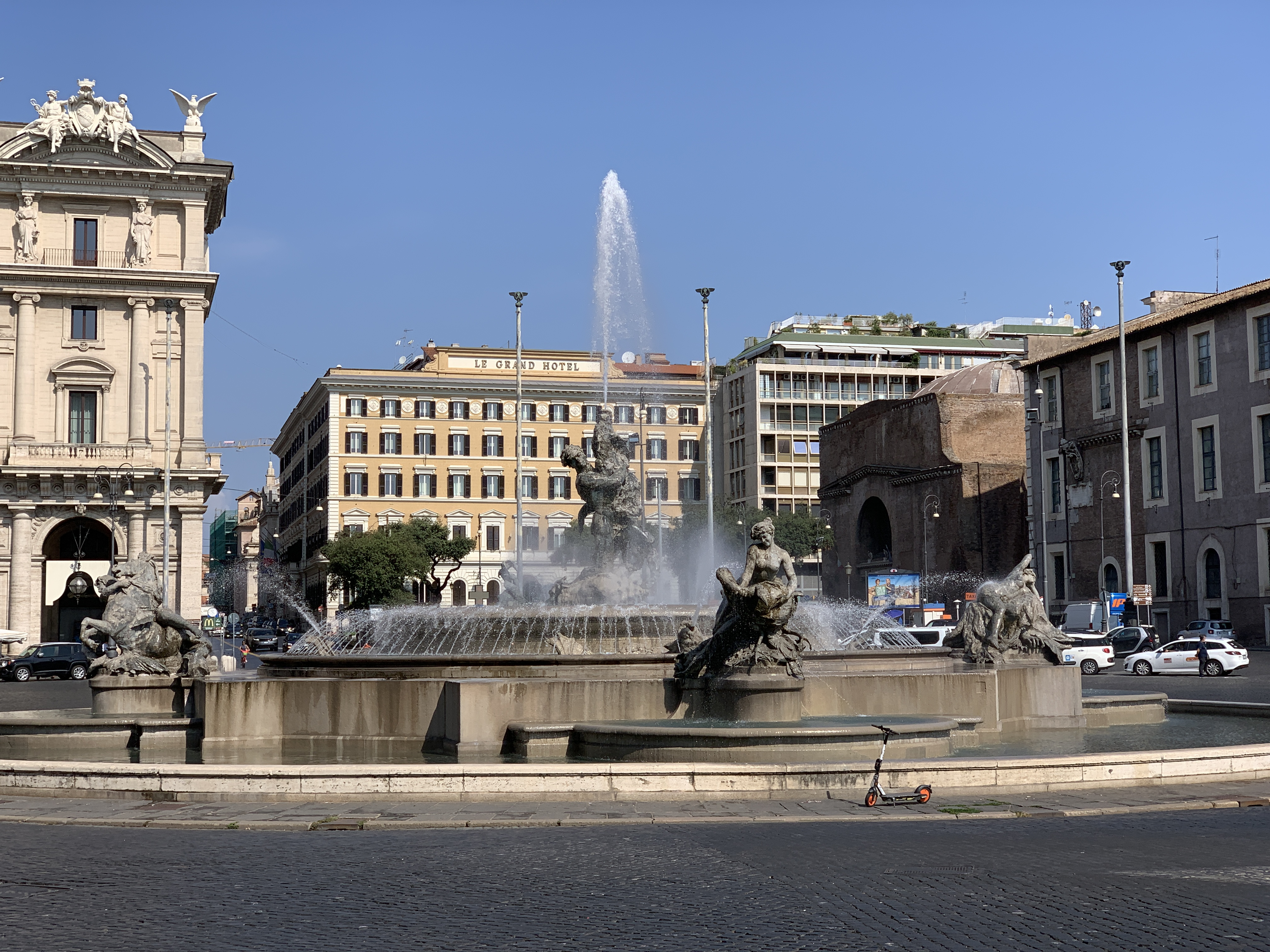
- Design: Alessandro Guerrieri
- Location: Piazza della Repubblica, Rome, Italy
- Interactive map of Fountain of the Naiads
- Coordinates: 41°54′10″N 12°29′47″E

The Fountain of the Naiads (Italian: Fontana delle Naiadi) is a fountain in Rome, Italy, located at the centre of the Piazza della Repubblica on the Viminal Hill. The fountain was created by the architect Alessandro Guerrieri in 1888. Its four bronze sculptures of naiads created by Mario Rutelli were added in 1901, and Rutelli's central sculpture of the god Glaucus was added in 1912.

== History ==
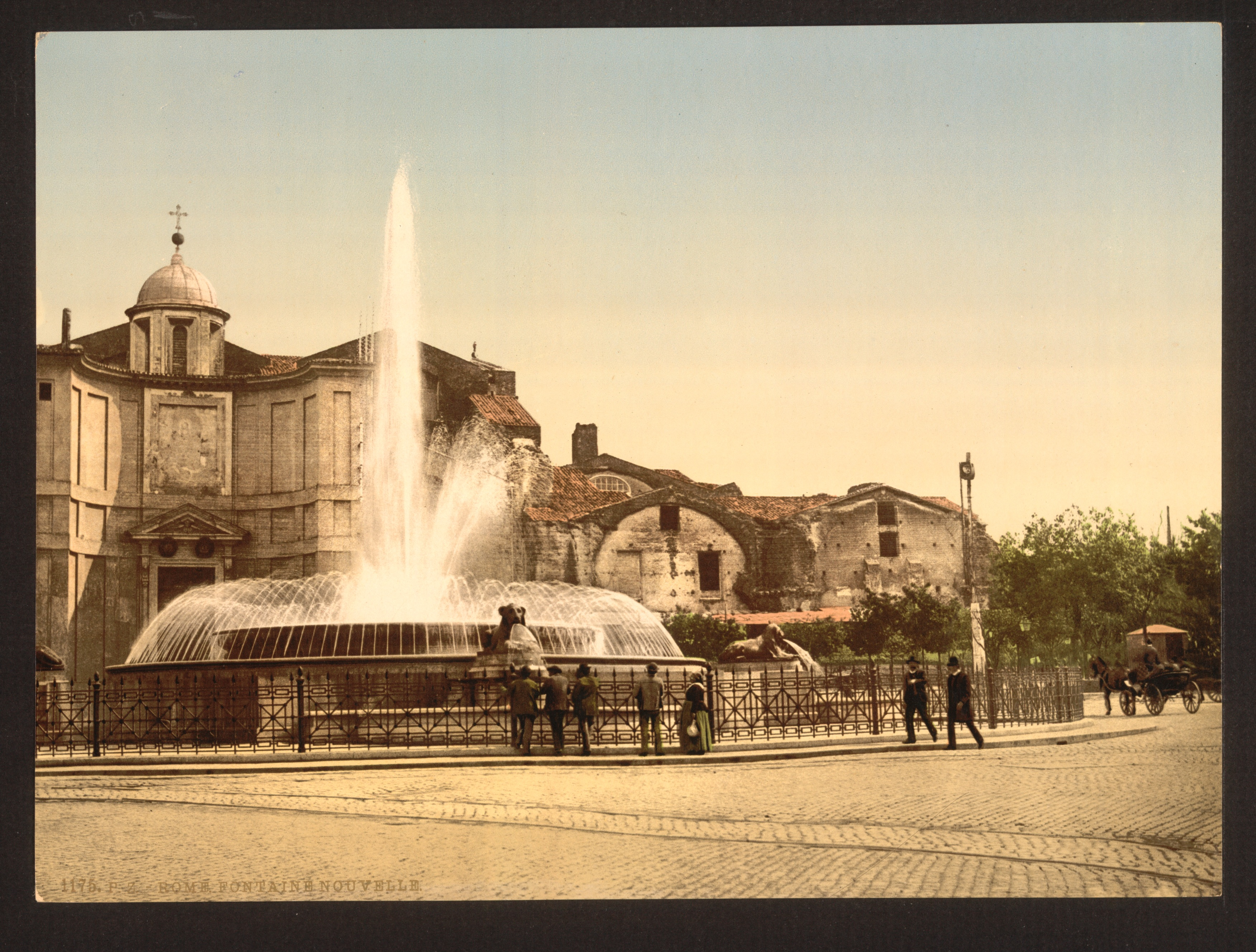
The fountain in the 1890s when it had sculptures of lions

The Fountain of the Naiads has its background in a desire to display water from Rome's Acqua Pia Antica Marcia, built as a restoration of the ancient Aqua Marcia and commissioned by Pope Pius IX, and was made to create something monumental for the Via Nazionale. The current structure replaced a temporary fountain which had been inaugurated on 10 September 1870. The new fountain was built in 1888 and was designed by the architect Alessandro Guerrieri who decorated it with four plaster lions.

In 1897, the sculptor Mario Rutelli created a set of bronze statues which replaced the lions. The new version of the fountain was inaugurated in 1901. Rutelli's original centre piece was considered unsuitable and moved to the garden of the Piazza Vittorio Emanuele II. It was replaced by a 1912 sculpture group by Rutelli before the fountain was re-inaugurated in 1914.

== Description ==
The Fountain of the Naiads is located at the centre of the Piazza della Repubblica on the Viminal Hill. The fountain basin is circular and made of concrete. It includes a high central water jet and a number of lateral jets. At night, the fountain is illuminated by LED lights.

Around the basin are four bronze sculptures depicting naiads, who are water nymphs from classical mythology. They are the Nymph of the Lakes, who is shown together with a swan, the Nymph of the Rivers, who rests on a river monster, Oceanina—the Nymph of the Oceans—who is taming a wild horse representing waves, and the Nymph of Groundwater, who reclines on a dragon's back. At the centre of the fountain, a sculpture of the sea god Glaucus symbolises the domination over natural forces. Glaucus is depicted as a naked and muscular man and the sculpture is reminiscent of the works of Gian Lorenzo Bernini. He holds a dolphin from whose mouth the central jet emerges.

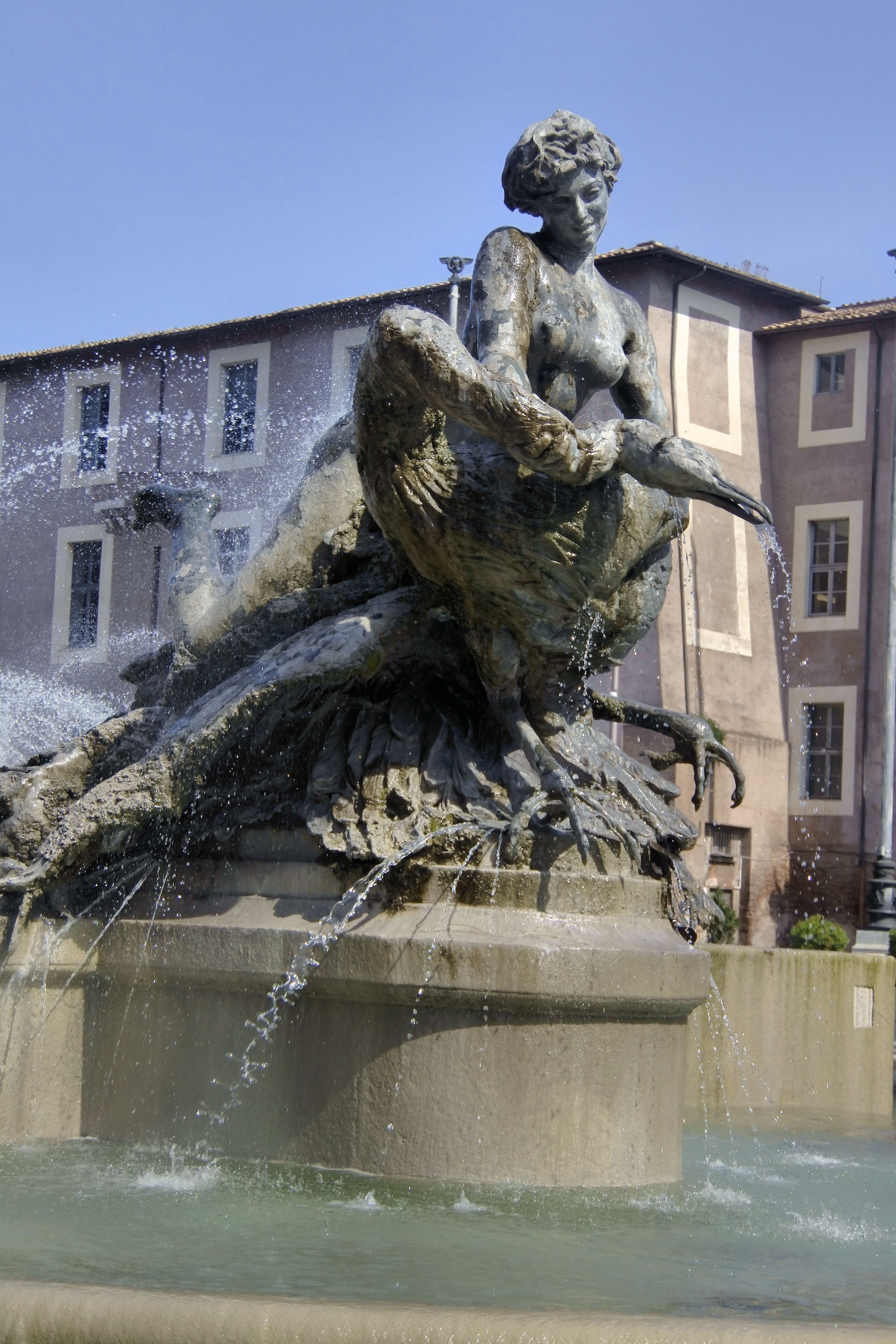
The Nymph of the Lakes

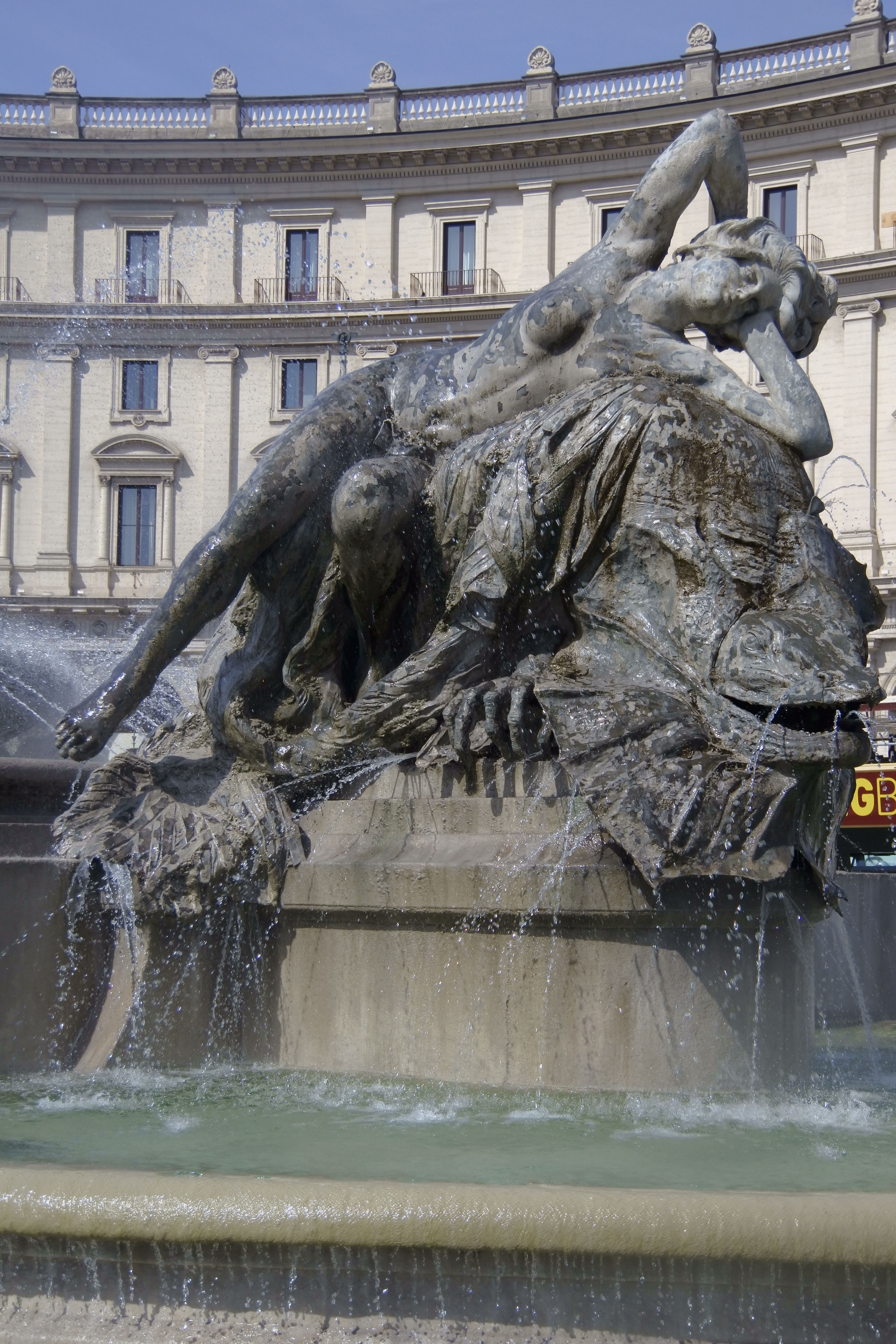
The Nymph of the Rivers

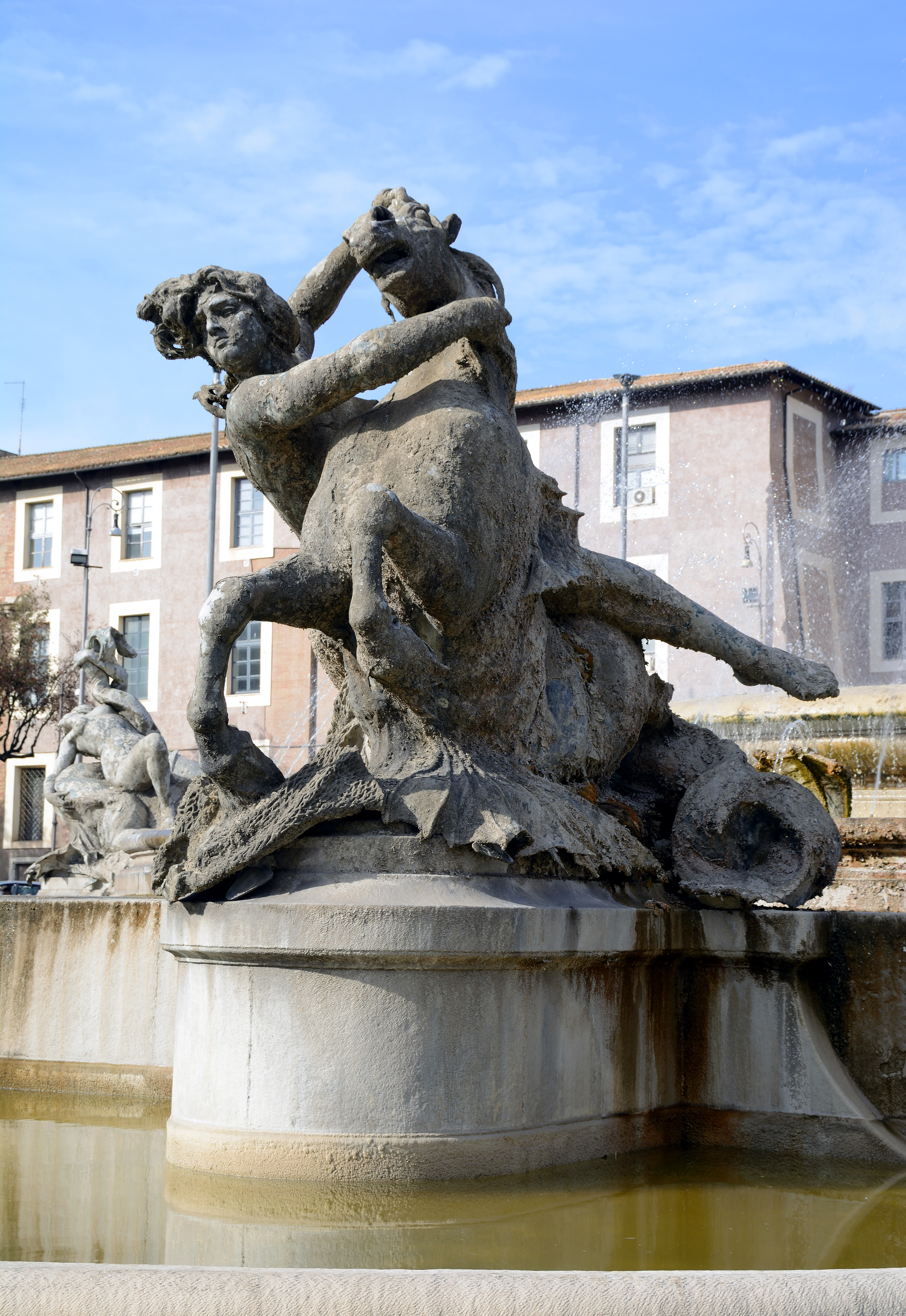
The Nymph of the Oceans

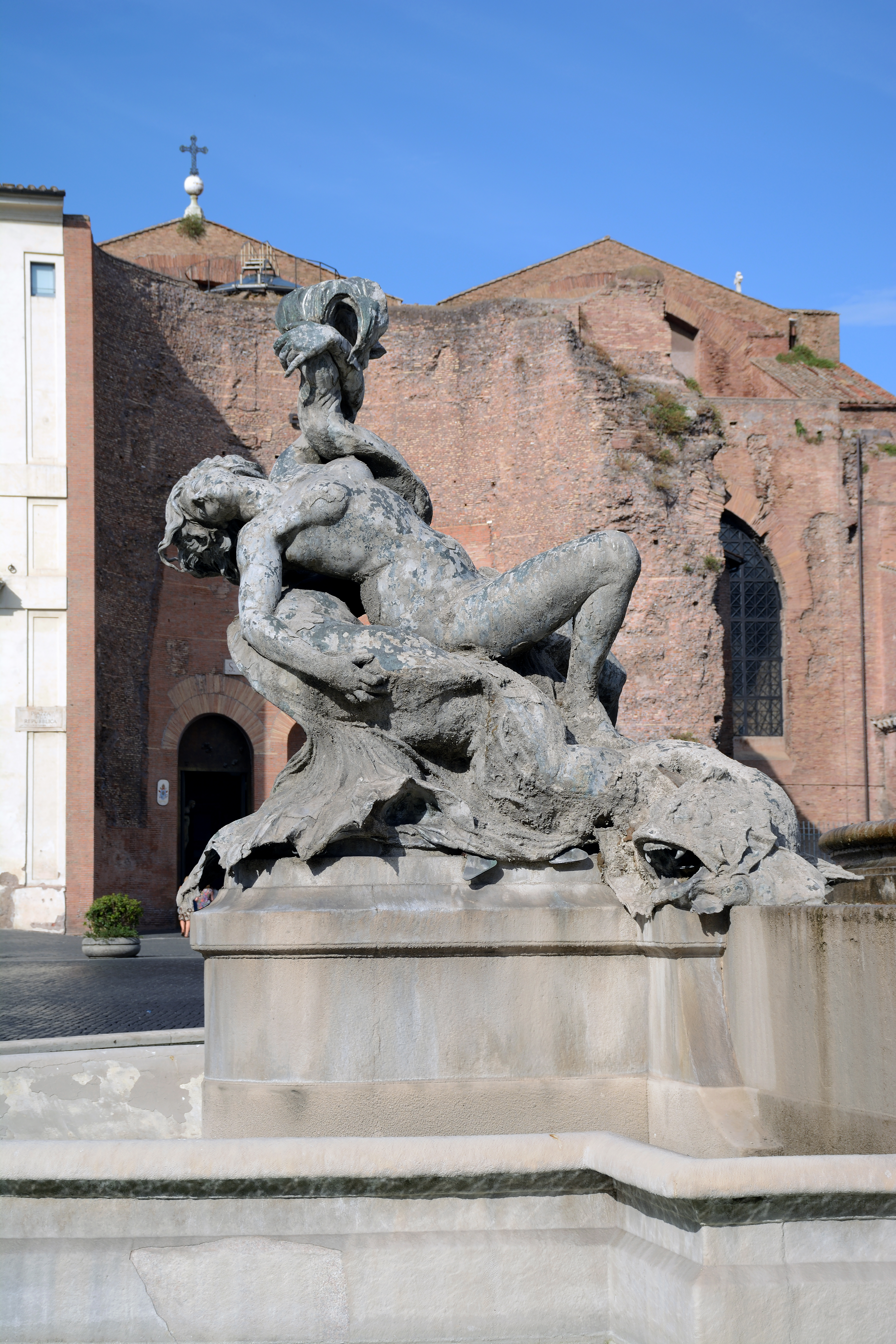
The Nymph of Groundwater

The Fountain of the Naiads is associated with Art Nouveau, of which it is regarded as one of the principal examples in Rome. According to the writer and journalist Willy Pocino, it "is considered the most beautiful of Rome's modern fountains".
