= Piazza della Repubblica, Rome =

Public square in Rome, Italy

Piazza della Repubblica
- City square
- {{{other_names}}}
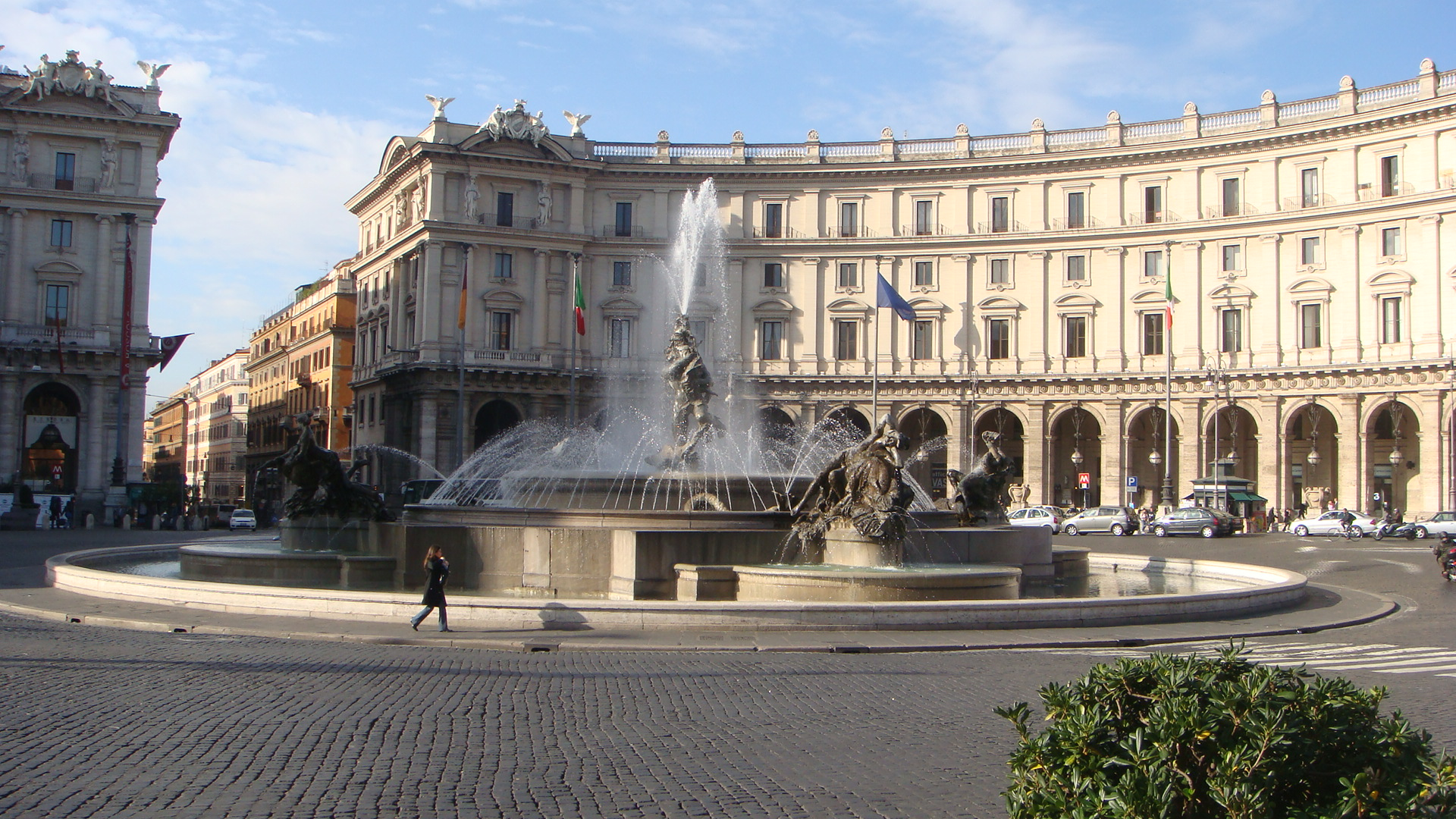
- Panorama of the Piazza.
- Location: Rome, Italy
- Interactive map of Piazza della Repubblica
- Coordinates: 41°54′09″N 12°29′47″E

Piazza della Repubblica is a circular piazza in Rome, at the summit of the Viminal Hill, next to the Termini station. On it is to be found Santa Maria degli Angeli e dei Martiri. It is served by the Repubblica – Teatro dell'Opera Metro station. From the square starts one of the main streets of Rome, Via Nazionale.

The former name of the piazza, Piazza dell'Esedra, still very common today, originates in the large exedra of the baths of Diocletian, which gives the piazza its shape. The exedra present in the baths of Diocletian was incorporated into the gardens built by Cardinal Jean du Bellay; on his death in 1560, the land was purchased by Cardinal Carlo Borromeo, and eventually came into the possession of Cardinal Alessandro Sforza in 1579. Between 1598 and 1600 the exedra was converted into a church. Then, in 1885, the Via Nazionale cut through the centre of this structure.

The porticos around the piazza, built in 1887–98 by Gaetano Koch, were in memory of the ancient buildings on the same sites, while the basilica of Santa Maria degli Angeli e dei Martiri on the piazza is based on a wing of the baths (with its architect Michelangelo, using the tepidarium as one of the wings of its spacious Greek cross plan).

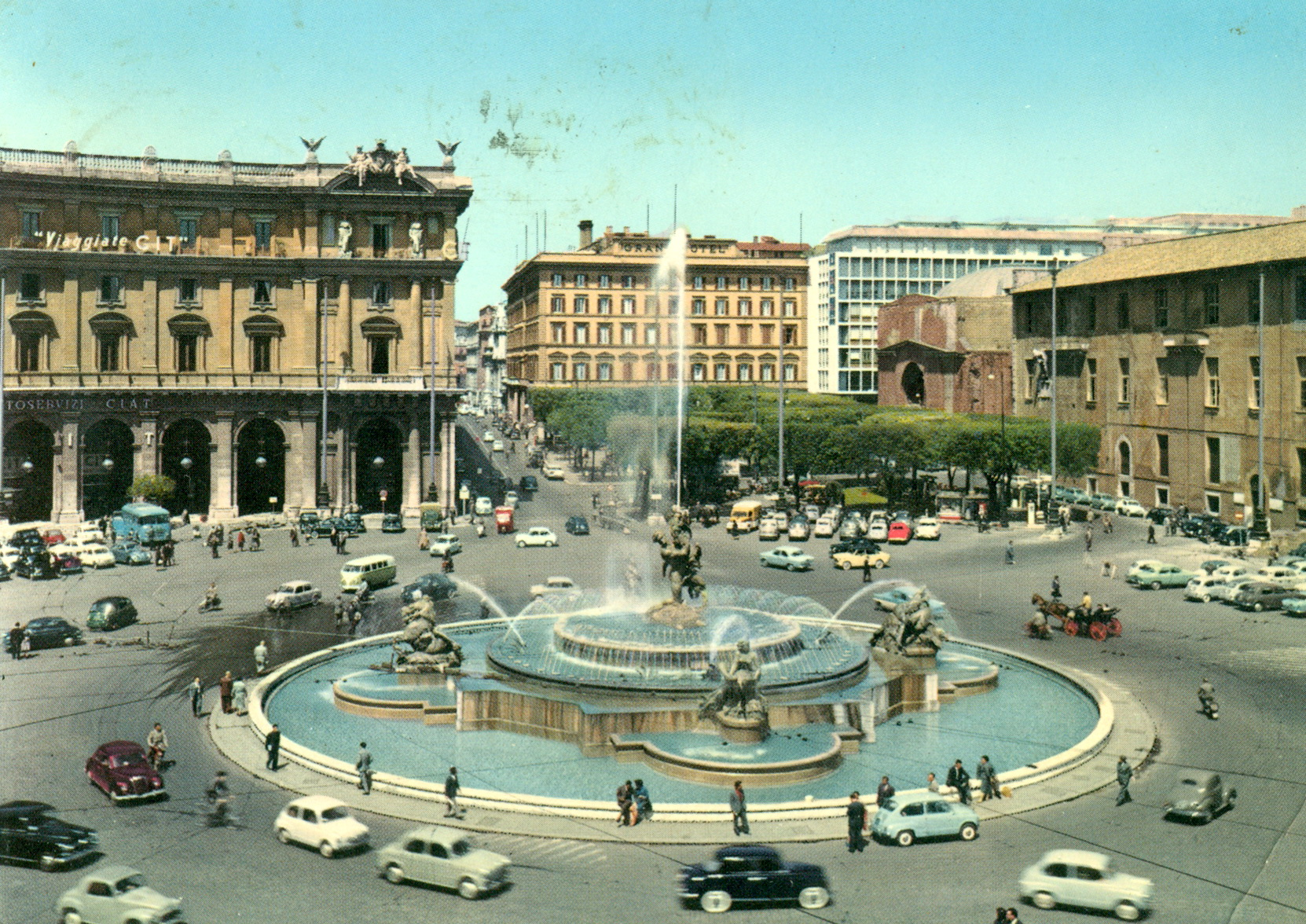
Panorama of the Piazza Esedra (Piazza della Repubblica) from 1964 postcard

== Fountain of the Naiads ==
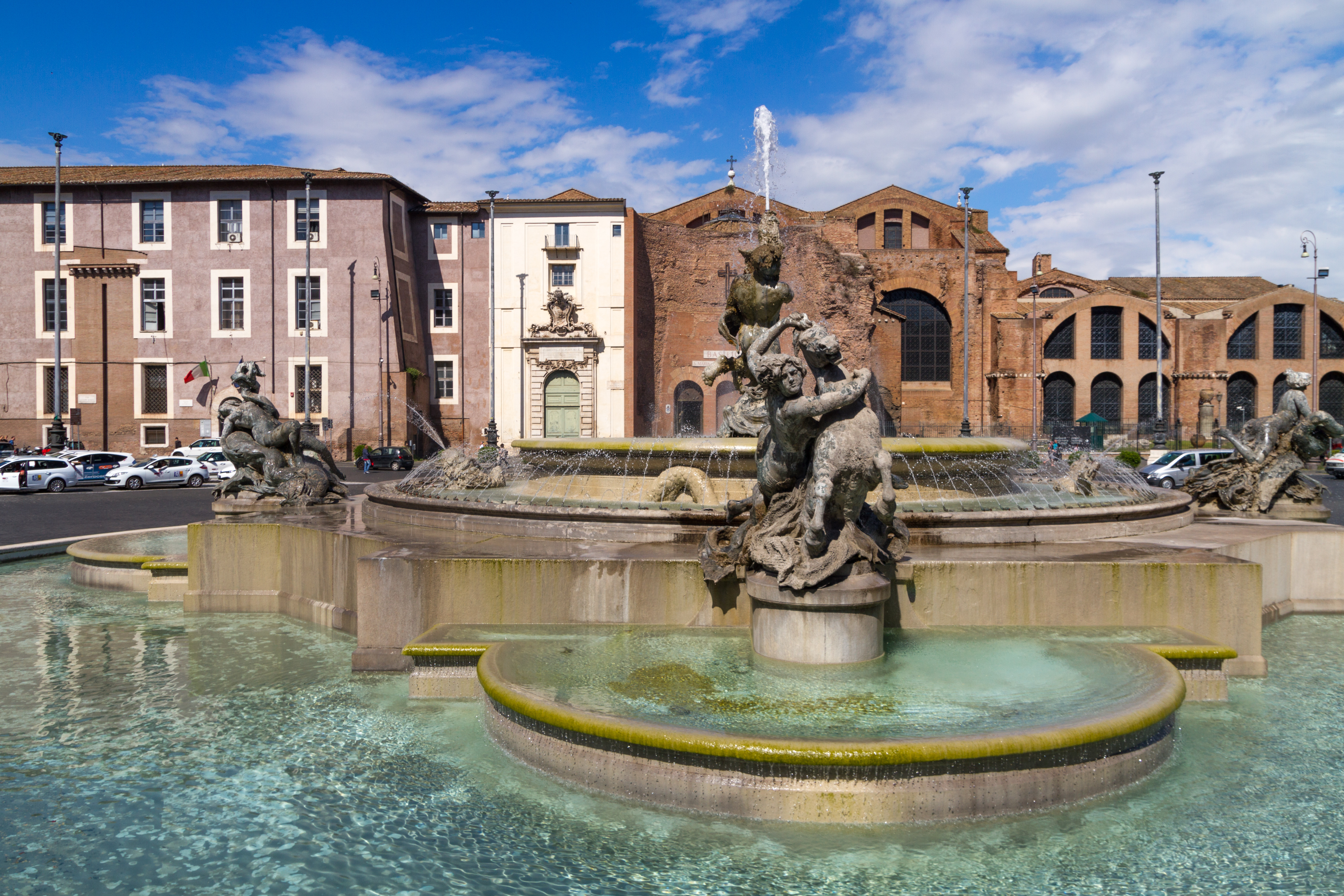
The Fountain of the Naiads

The fountain in this square was originally the fountain of the Acqua Pia (connected to the aqua Marcia aqueduct), commissioned this site by Pope Pius IX in 1870. Completed in 1888, it originally showed four plaster lions designed by Alessandro Guerrieri. These were then replaced in 1901 with sculptures of Naiads by Mario Rutelli from Palermo, the great-grandfather of the politician and former mayor of Rome, Francesco Rutelli.

The naiads represented are the Nymph of the Lakes (recognisable by the swan she holds), the Nymph of the Rivers (stretched out on a monster of the rivers), the Nymph of the Oceans (riding a horse symbolising of the sea), and the Nymph of the Underground Waters (leaning over a mysterious dragon). In the centre is Rutelli's Glauco group (1911/12), symbolizing the dominion of the man over natural force and replacing a previous sculpture.

== See also ==
- List of tourist attractions in Rome
- Piazza della Repubblica, Florence

Preceded by Piazza della Minerva	Landmarks of Rome; Piazza della Repubblica, Rome	Succeeded by Piazza Farnese
