= Monument to Nicola Spedalieri =

Statue in Rome

Coordinates: 41.89830°N 12.46778°E

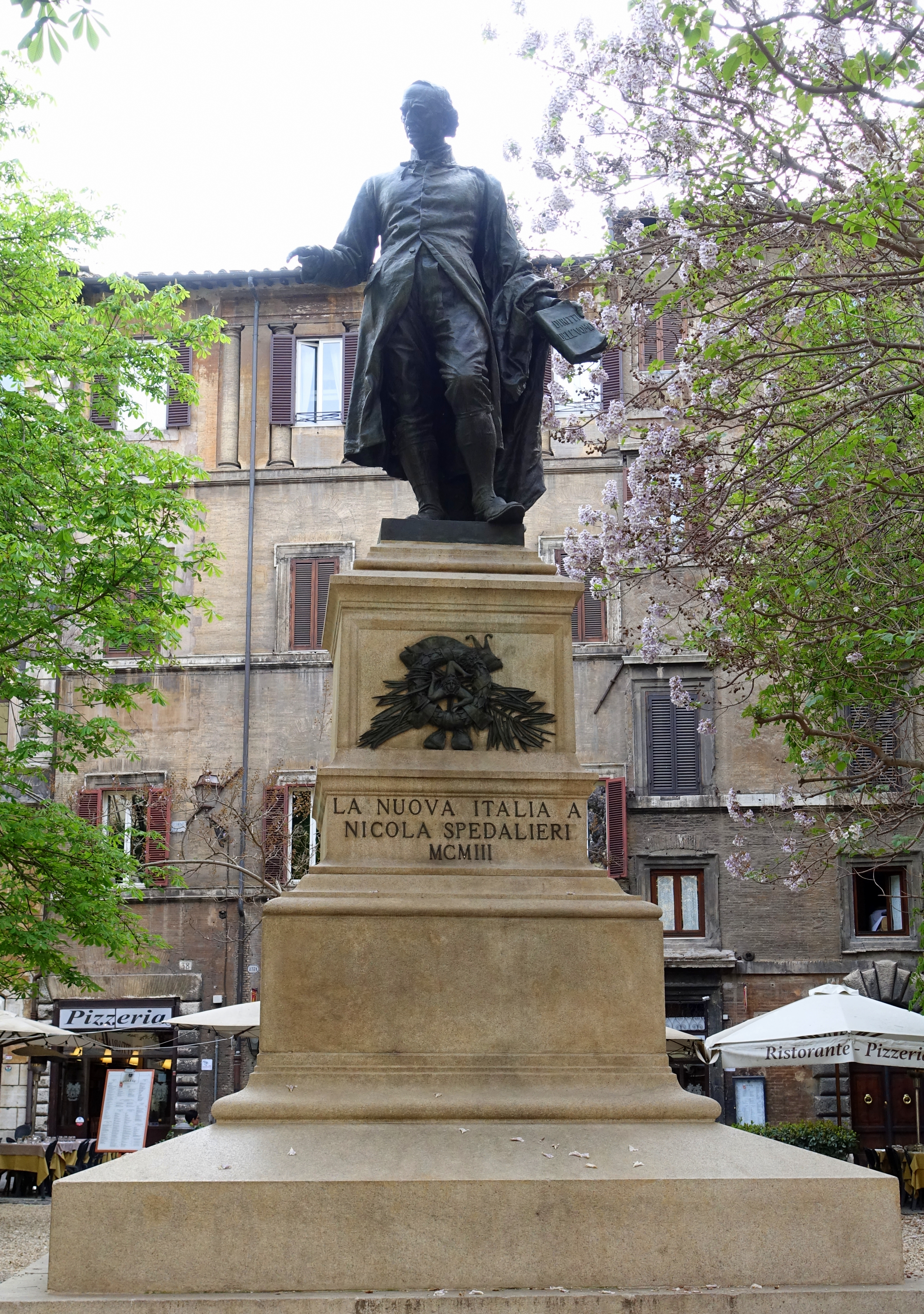
- Interactive map of Monument to Nicola Spedalieri
- Location: Rome, Italy
- Designer: Mario Rutelli
- Type: Statue
- Material: Bronze
- Opening date: 23 November 1903
- Dedicated to: Nicola Spedalieri

The Monument to Nicola Spedalieri is a memorial statue to an 18th-century priest and political theorist (1740–1795); the statue was installed in 1903 at the Piazza Sforza Cesarini along the Corso Vittorio Emanuele II in central Rome, Italy. Spedalieri and his ideas, and thus the monument, have been variously disputed or celebrated by different factions.

Spedalieri's most famous work, De' diritti dell'Uomo (1791), had a mixed reception. Written as a critique of the Declaration of the Rights of Man and of the Citizen approved by the French National Assembly in 1789, Spedalieri supports the idea of natural rights of man, and opposes a tyrannical law imposed by rulers claiming a divine anointment. However, he claims that the selfish desires of human nature need to be tempered by religious authority, specifically Roman Catholic morality. The anti-absolutist ideas in his writings stirred opposition from ruling authorities battling the rising Jacobin and republican forces. These notions led liberal forces of the 19th century to honor him as the origin of an Italian enlightenment about the rights of citizens.

By the late 19th century, Rome, the new capital of the Italian Kingdom, was seeking to memorialize the past in ways that celebrated their political beliefs, but also the struggles for an Italian identity. The Corso had been widened and flanking areas embellished with a number of memorials to both recent heroes of the Italian independence, but also to historical opponents of the forces hindering an Italian identity, for example, Giordano Bruno's monument at Campo di Fiori. Spedalieri was an awkward figure to defend by Liberals, since he had also been supported and supportive in his day of the Papacy.

This monument was first proposed in 1882 by the lawyer Giuseppe Cimbali, a native from the same town in Sicily where Spedalieri was born. In 1893 a committee was established to supervise a contest to erect a monument by the centennial of Spedialeri's death. None of the proposals received by 1894 were approved. A second round of proposals the next year led to the selection of the design by Sicilian sculptor Mario Rutelli. The site and inauguration of the monument were controversial, and the monument was first unveiled, without ceremony, in Piazza Vidoni (alongside the church of Sant'Andrea della Valle) in the middle of the night of 23 November 1903. In 1951, because of the busy location, the statue was moved to the present Piazza, where it replaced the Monument to Terenzio Mamiani, which was then moved about four blocks north to a park at the intersection of the Corso and Via Acciaioli. Paradoxically Mamiani had written scholarly reassessments of Spedialeri's works that kept the latter's influence current.

The monument is a bronze statue on a pedestal. Spedalieri stands with this opus of Diritti dell'uomo in his left hand. His vestments are not ecclesiastical. Below, on the pedestal is a wreath with the Trinacria, a symbol of Sicily, surrounded by palm leaves. The 1903 inscription reads that the new Italy memorializes Spedalieri.
