= Bernardino da Ucria =

Italian botanist (1739–1796)

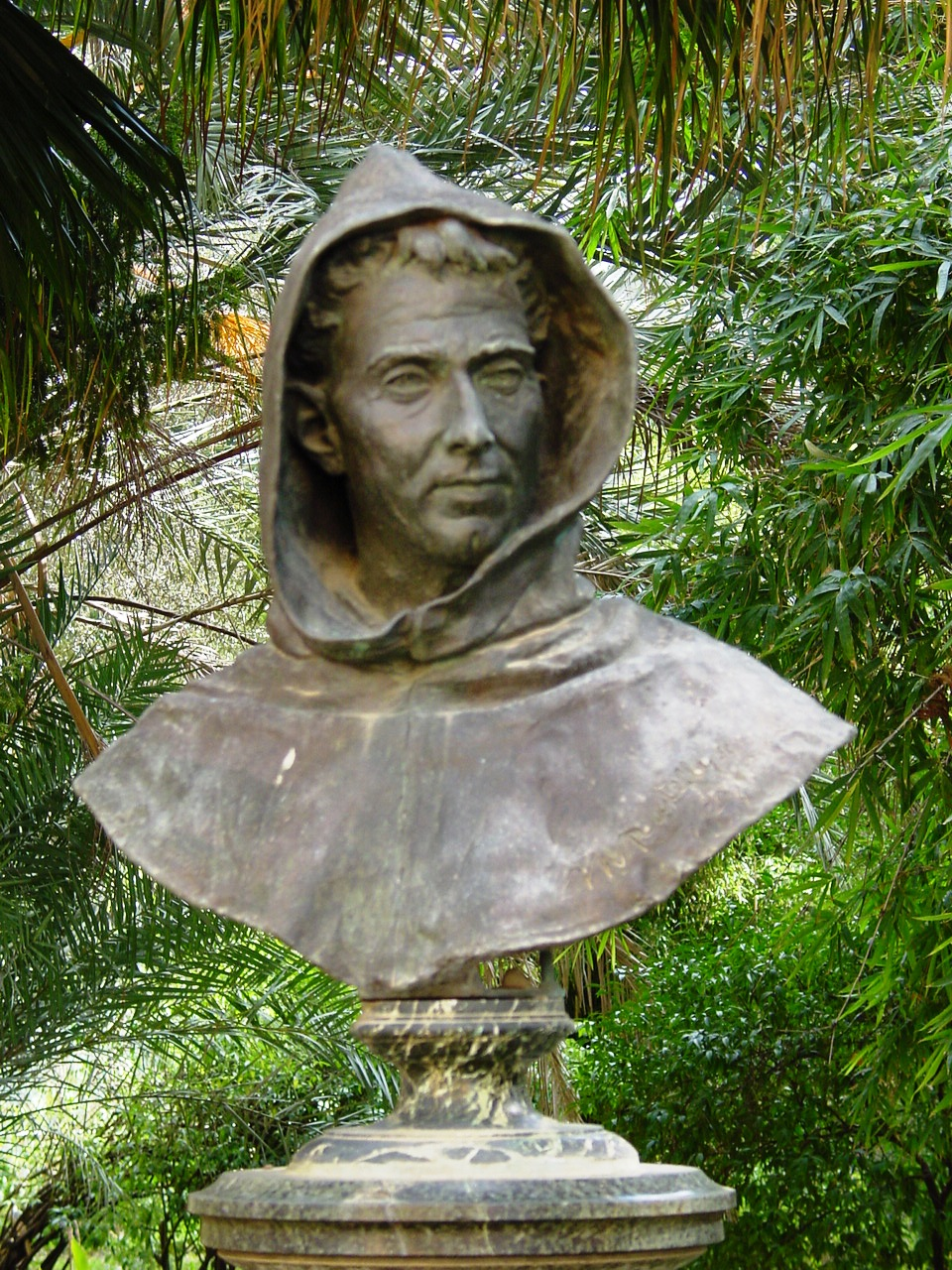
Bernardino da Ucria (1739–1796)

Placido Michele Aurifici, better known as Bernardino da Ucria (9 April 1739 in Ucria, Sicily – 29 January 1796 in Palermo) was a Sicilian friar and botanist.

In 1766 he entered the Franciscan monastery of St Antony in Palermo, taking the name Bernardino, by which he is now known. He developed a keen interest in botany and in 1786 was appointed demonstrator in botany at the University of Palermo, in which capacity he was involved in the establishment and named custodian of the new Palermo Botanical Garden on the site that it still occupies. A keen student of Carl Linnaeus, he was responsible for the layout of the original section of garden on the basis of the Linnean system of classification. A sculpted bust of Bernardino by Mario Rutelli is situated in the garden.

He traveled extensively through Sicily collecting plant specimens for his botanical garden. In 1789, Bernardino published his major work, Hortius regius panormitanus, a catalogue of the plants in the Botanical Garden, with notes on their wild origins in Sicily and, where appropriate, their medicinal uses. Three years later he published Plantae ad Linnaeanum opus addendae, a short pamphlet in which he described 32 new species of plants.

== Works ==
- Hortius regius panormitanus (Palermo 1789)
- Plantae ad Linnaeanum opus addendae, et secundum Linnaei sistema noviter descriptae (1792)
