= Acqua Pia Antica Marcia =

Coordinates: 41°53′27″N 12°30′53″E

The Acqua Pia Antica Marcia or Aqua Pia is an aqueduct in Rome. It was first built as a restoration of the classical Aqua Marcia by Luigi Canina, commissioned by Pope Pius IX. Its city terminus was the Fountain of the Naiads in the Piazza Esedra.

The Acqua Pia Antica Marcia SpA society was formed in 1868 to manage and sell the waters of this aqueduct; this society was for a long time one of the main water suppliers to Rome, and still manages some fountains and drains. This proved necessary with Rome's population expansion at this period but the infrastructure's expansion was not achieved without resistance. Moves to create a secondary source for the aqueduct in the commune of Agosto led to its residents organizing a guerilla army, which stopped the society from creating this new source until the end of the Second World War.
