= Comiso =

Comiso Comìsio (Greek)
- Comune
- Comune di Comiso
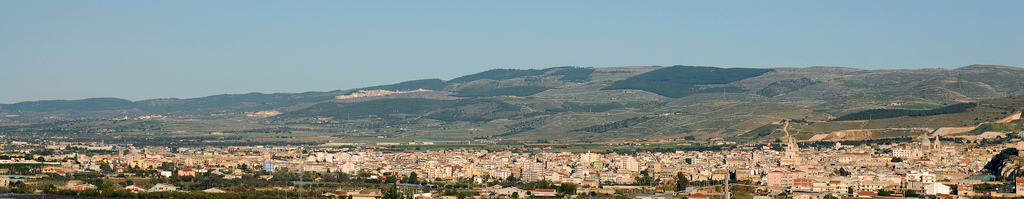
- A view of Comiso

- Flag Coat of arms

- Comiso within the Province of Ragusa

- Location within Italy Location within Sicily
- Coordinates: 36°57′N 14°36′E
- Country: Italy
- Region: Sicily
- Province: Ragusa (RG)
- Frazioni: Pedalino, Quaglio

Government
  - Mayor: Maria Rita Schembari

Area
  - Total: 65.4 km^{2} (25.3 sq mi)
- Elevation: 209–270 m (686–886 ft)

Population (31 December 2025)
  - Total: 30,437
  - Density: 465/km^{2} (1,210/sq mi)
- Demonym: Comisani
- Time zone: UTC+1 (CET)
  - Summer (DST): UTC+2 (CEST)
- Postal code: 97013
- Dialing code: 0932
- Patron saint: Saint Blaise
- Saint day: Second Sunday of July
- Website: Official website

Comiso (Sicilian: U Còmisu) is a comune of the Province of Ragusa, Sicily, Southern Italy. As of 31 December 2025, its population was 30,437. and there are 3,334 foreign residents, representing 11.0% of the total population. The largest foreign community is the one from Tunisia, accounting for 38.9% of all foreigners in the area, followed by Romania and Albania.

== History ==
In the past, Comiso has been incorrectly identified with the ancient Greek colony of Casmene in Magna Graecia.

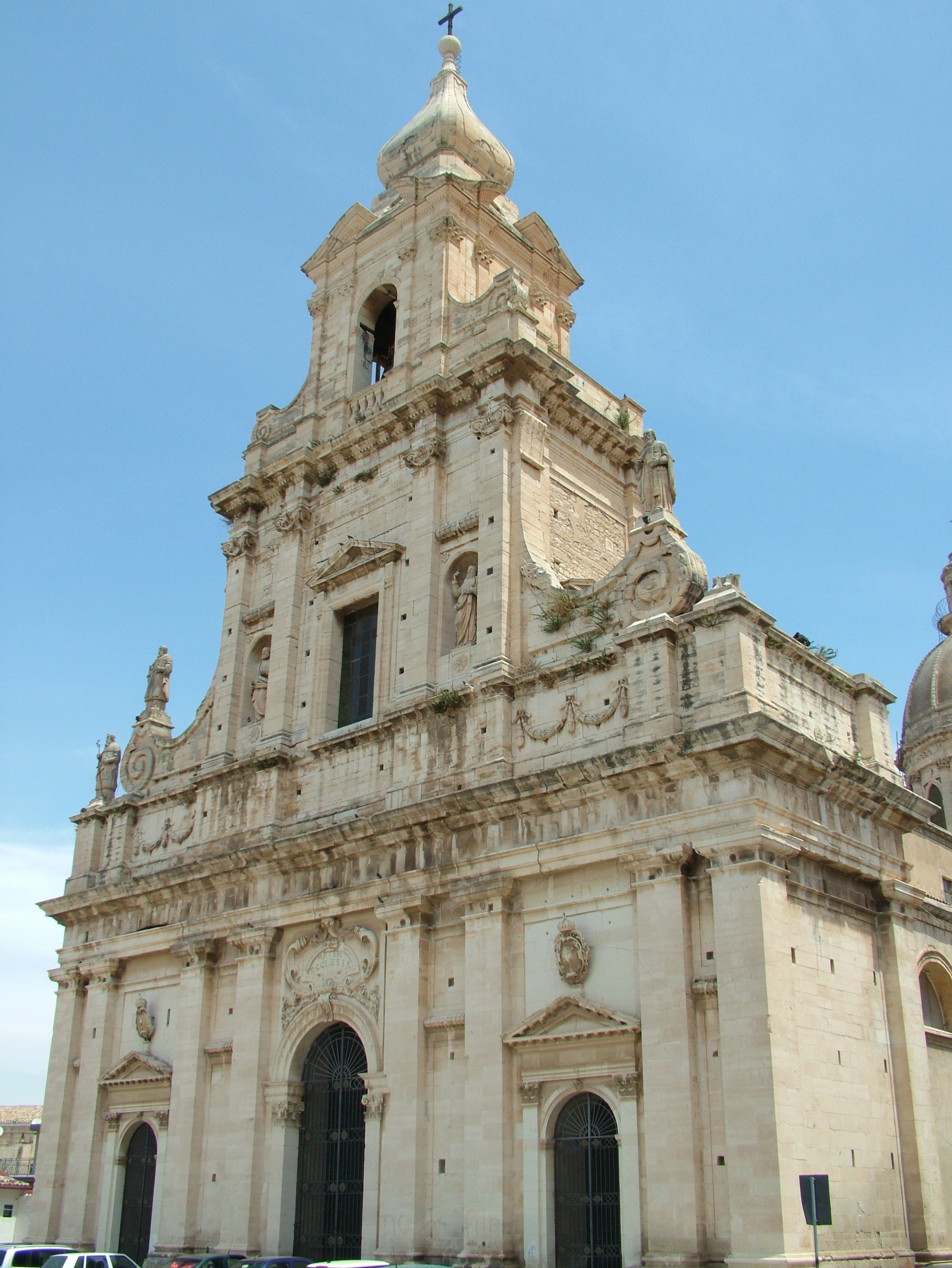
Santa Maria delle Stelle church,

Under the Byzantines, a new borough began to grow on Comiso's present site around the monasteries of Saint Nicolò and Saint Blaise, expanding further under the later Norman and Aragonese domination of Sicily. It was later a fief of the Chiaromonte, Cabrera and Naselli families: the latter, counts of the city from 1571, boosted the economy of the city and built new district outside the ancient walls.

Comiso was devastated by the 1693 earthquake and rebuilt on the same spot as the old ruins in the Sicilian Baroque style.

The United States Air Force deployed Ground Launched Cruise Missiles (GLCM) to Comiso Air Base in June 1983. Women from Italy, Europe, and other parts of the world created a peace camp in Comiso in 1983 to protest the building of the base. They were inspired by women activists at the Greenham Common Women's Peace Camp in England.

The missiles were eventually dismantled after the Intermediate-Range Nuclear Forces Treaty (INF) was signed by the former Soviet Union and the United States on 8 December 1987. The last 16 GLCMs left Comiso Air Base in 1991 and the American-occupied part of the base was returned to Italian control.

== Geography ==
Comiso borders the municipalities of Chiaramonte Gulfi, Ragusa and Vittoria.

The municipality has two hamlets (frazioni): Pedalino and Quaglio. The town is 22 kilometres (14 mi) west of Ragusa and 6 7 kilometres (4.3 mi) east of Vittoria.

== Main sights ==
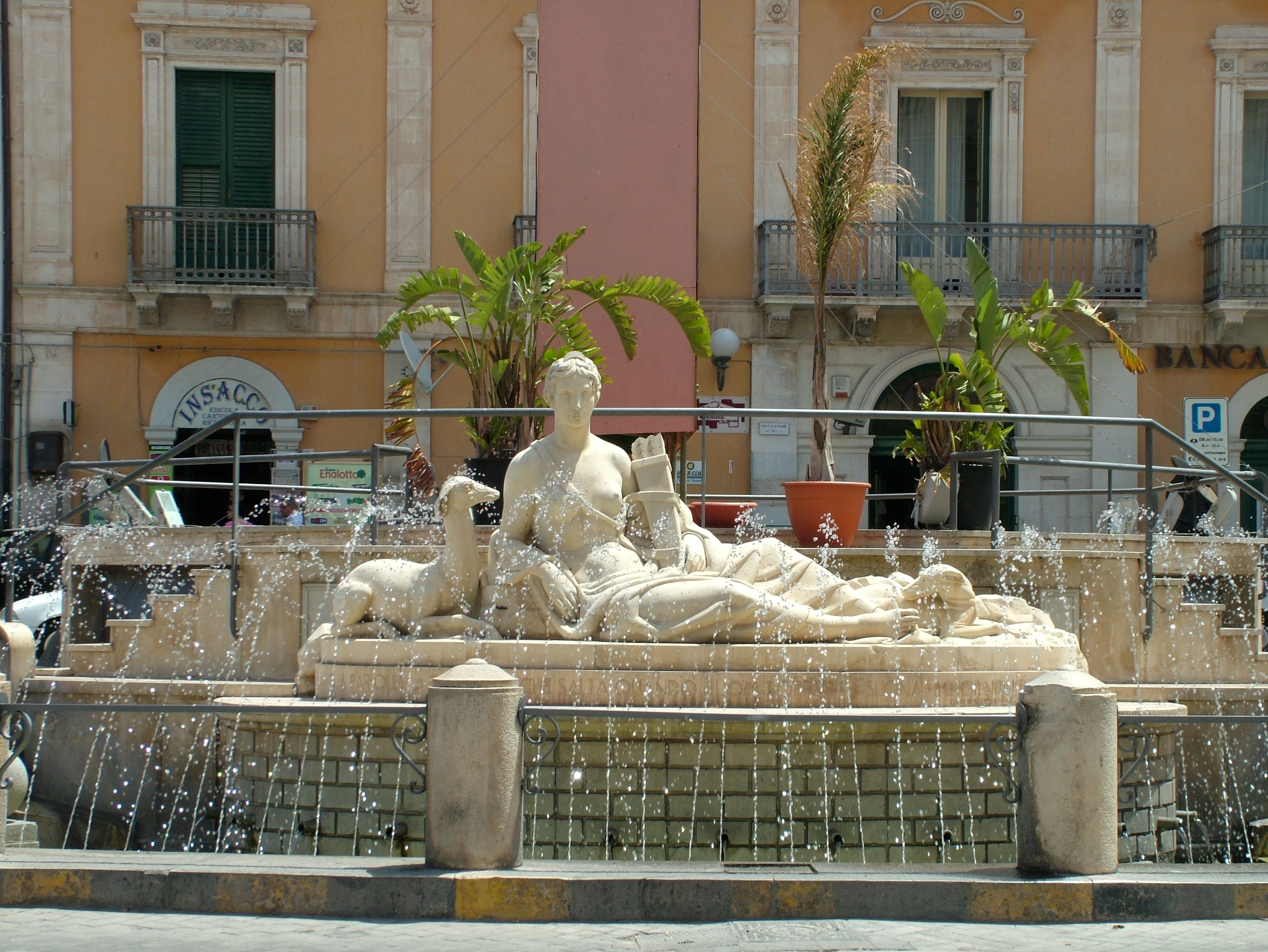
The Fountain of Diana.

- Hot Springs, first constructed during the Roman era, with remnants of mosaics dating from the 2nd century.
- Mother Church of Santa Maria delle Grazie, from the 15th century, greatly damaged by the earthquake of 1693. It has a nave and two aisles, with rich internal decorations dating from the 17th century. The high altar has a painting representing the Nativity of the Virgin, attributed to Carlo Maratta.
- San Filippo Neri (16th century), a church with the annexed oratory.
- San Francesco dell'Immacolata, a church built in the 13th century, with a quadrangular cloister added in the 15th century. The church houses the burial chapel of the Naselli barons, with a funerary monument of Baldassarre II Naselli attributed to Antonello Gagini.
- Maria Santissima Annunziata, a parish church and minor basilica dedicated to the Virgin of the Annunciation, founded in the 16th century and rebuilt from 1772 to 1773 when a baroque façade was added. The interior has artworks dating from the 15th century onwards, as well as a marble font by Mario Rutelli (1912).
- Castello Naselli, originally an octagonal Byzantine fortress, renovated in the 14th century.
- Peace Pagoda, a stupa dedicated on 24 May 1998, by the Reverend Gyosho Morishita of the Nipponzan-Myōhōji Buddhist Order, near the NATO base.

== Economy ==
The main sectors are agriculture (wine and vegetables) and trades, including smithing, cabinet making and marble work. The Comisana breed of sheep takes its name from Comiso.

== Transport ==
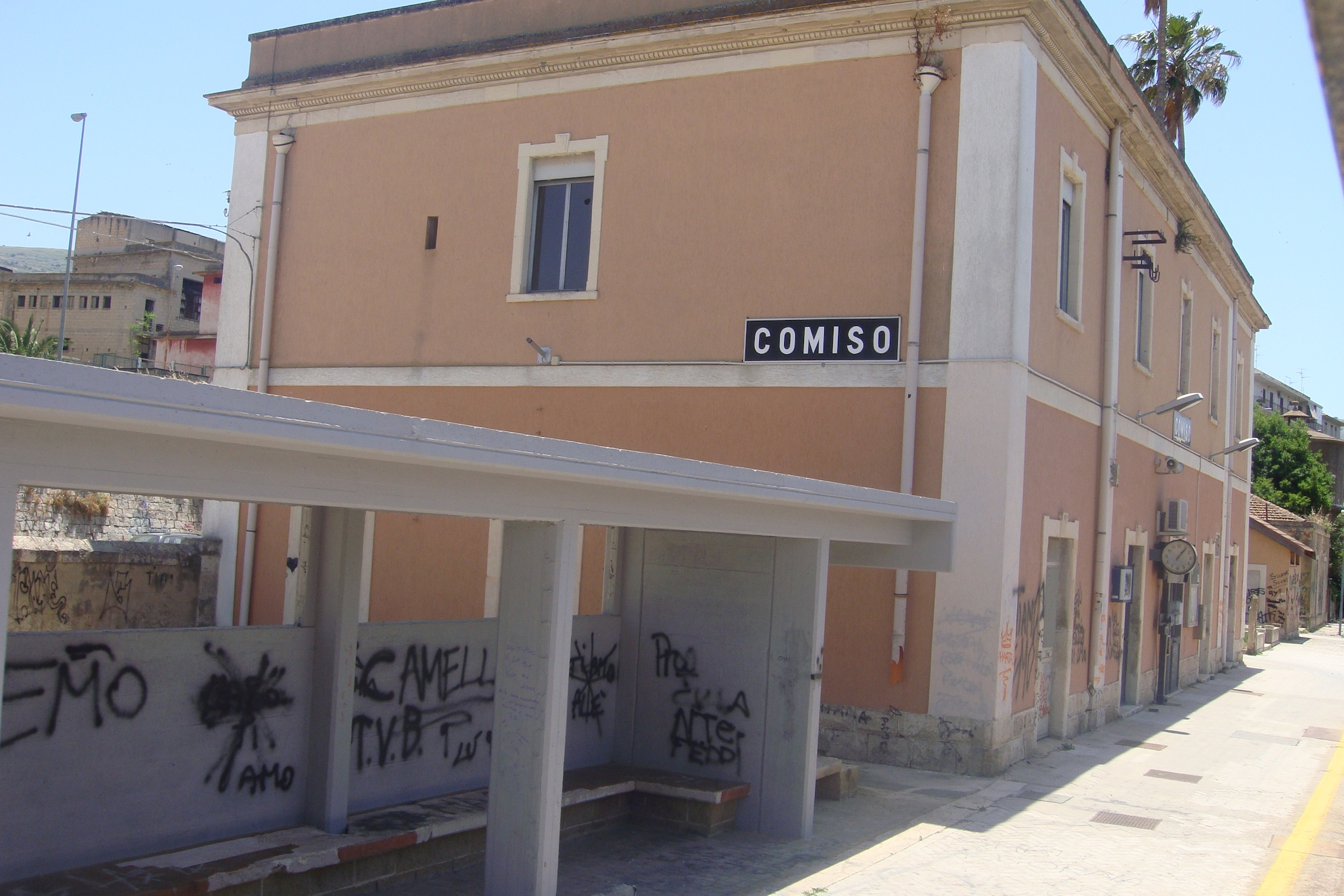
Comiso station building in 2009

Comiso is connected to nearby towns and cities by bus service and has a railway station, which lies on the Syracuse-Ragusa-Gela-Canicattì-Caltanissetta line. The train journey is 30 minutes to Ragusa, 1 hour to Licata, 2 hours 17 minutes to Caltanissetta Xirbi and 2 hours 30 minutes to Syracuse.

Comiso Airport is located 5 kilometres (3 mi) north of the town. It was converted from a military base into a modern "Vincenzo Magliocco" civilian airport in 2013 and was later named to Pio La Torre.

The main roads serving Comiso are the SS.115 (Sud Occidentale Sicula) and the SS.514 (di Chiaramonte).

The SS194 Ragusana stretch is in the process of being doubled by ANAS, being adapted into a two-lane motorway for each direction of travel on separate carriageways. The approved project concerns the Ragusa-Catania route, and includes the modernization of the State Roads 514 "of Chiaramonte" and 194 "Ragusana" to four lanes, in the section between the junction with the State Road 115, near Comiso.

The A18 Siracusa-Gela is an Italian motorway in eastern Sicily, only partially completed for its first 59 kilometers. It begins near Syracuse as an extension of the SS114 Orientale Sicula, and temporarily ends at the Modica junction, where it joins the SS194 Ragusana.

== People ==
- Salvatore Adamo (b. 1943), singer
- Gesualdo Bufalino (1920–1996), writer
- Emilio Docente (b. 1983), footballer
- Salvatore Fiume (1915–1997), painter
- Giuseppe Mascara (b. 1979), footballer
- Biagio Pace (1889–1955), archaeologist and politician
- Biagio Pelligra (b. 1937), actor
- Cristina Scuccia (b. 1989), singer

== Gallery ==
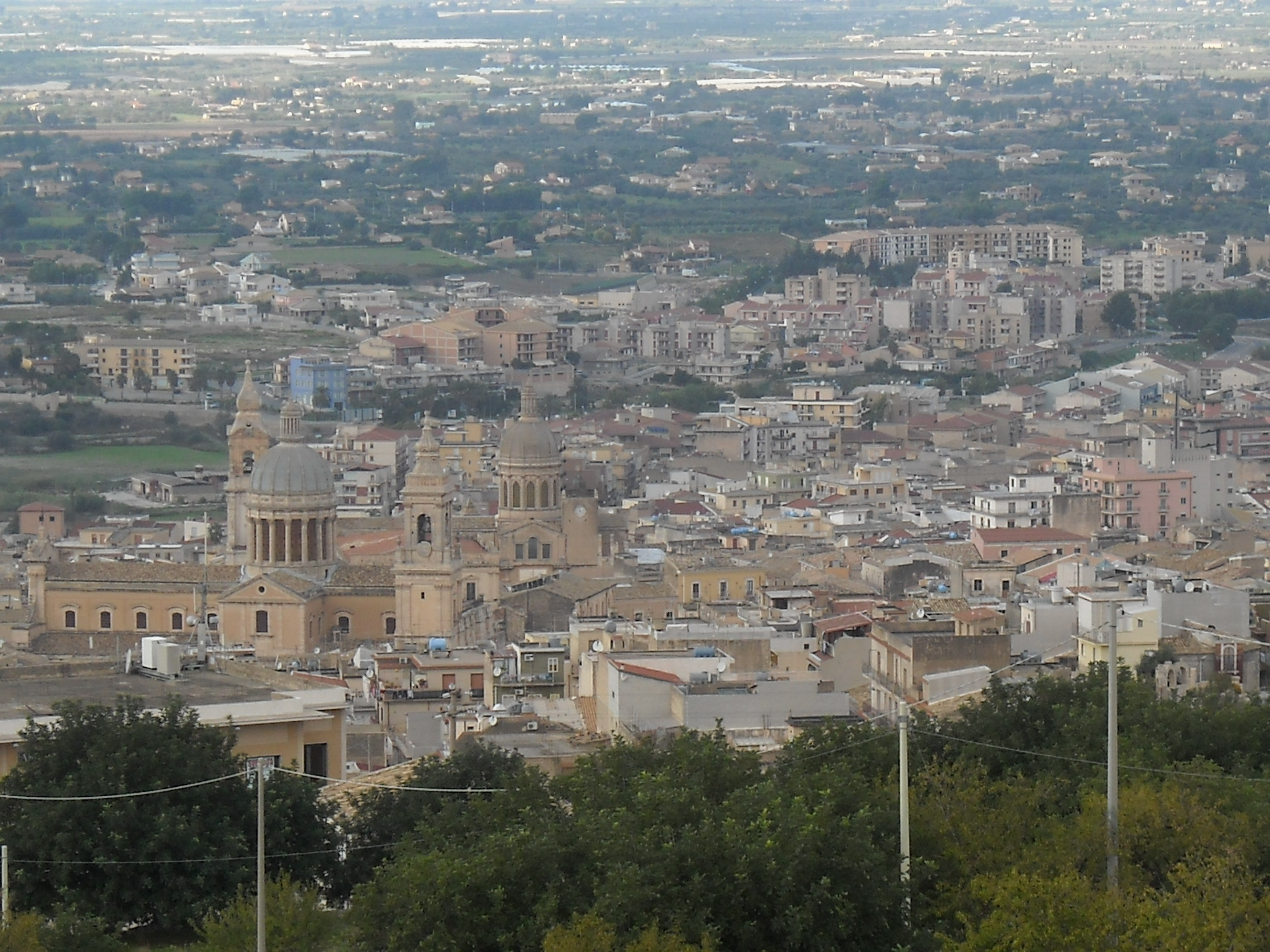
Panorama

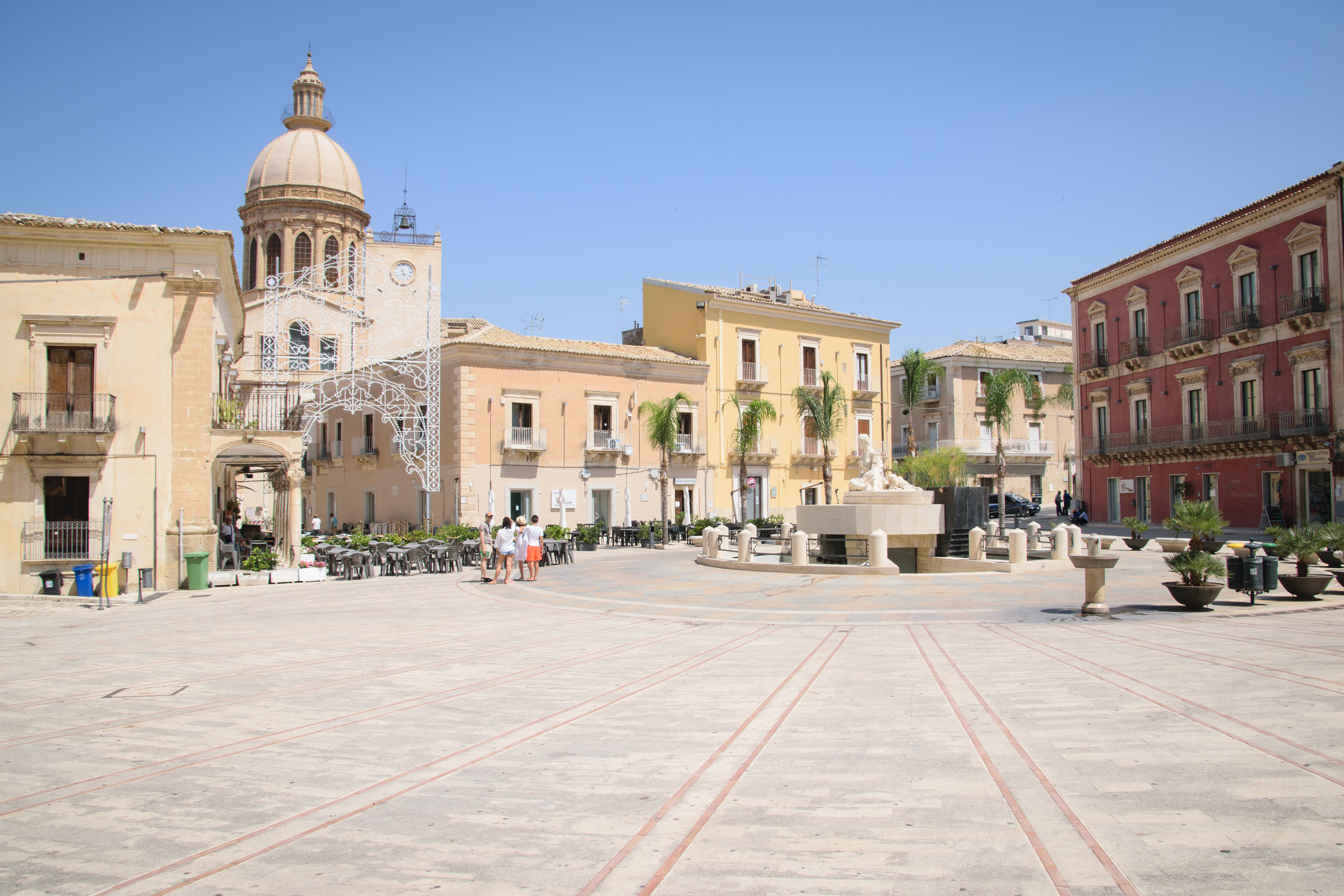
Comiso, piazza Fonte Diana

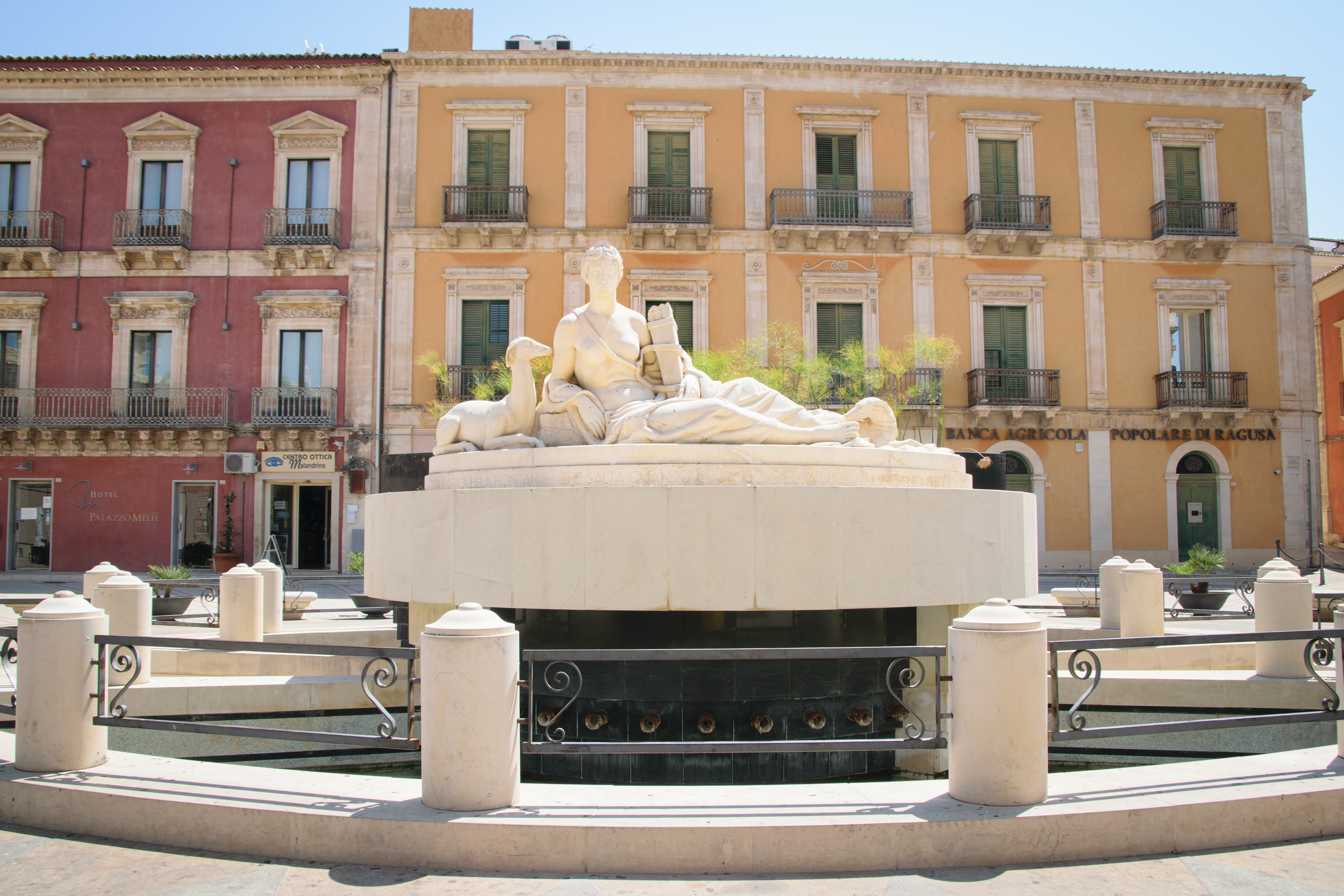
Comiso, Fonte Diana

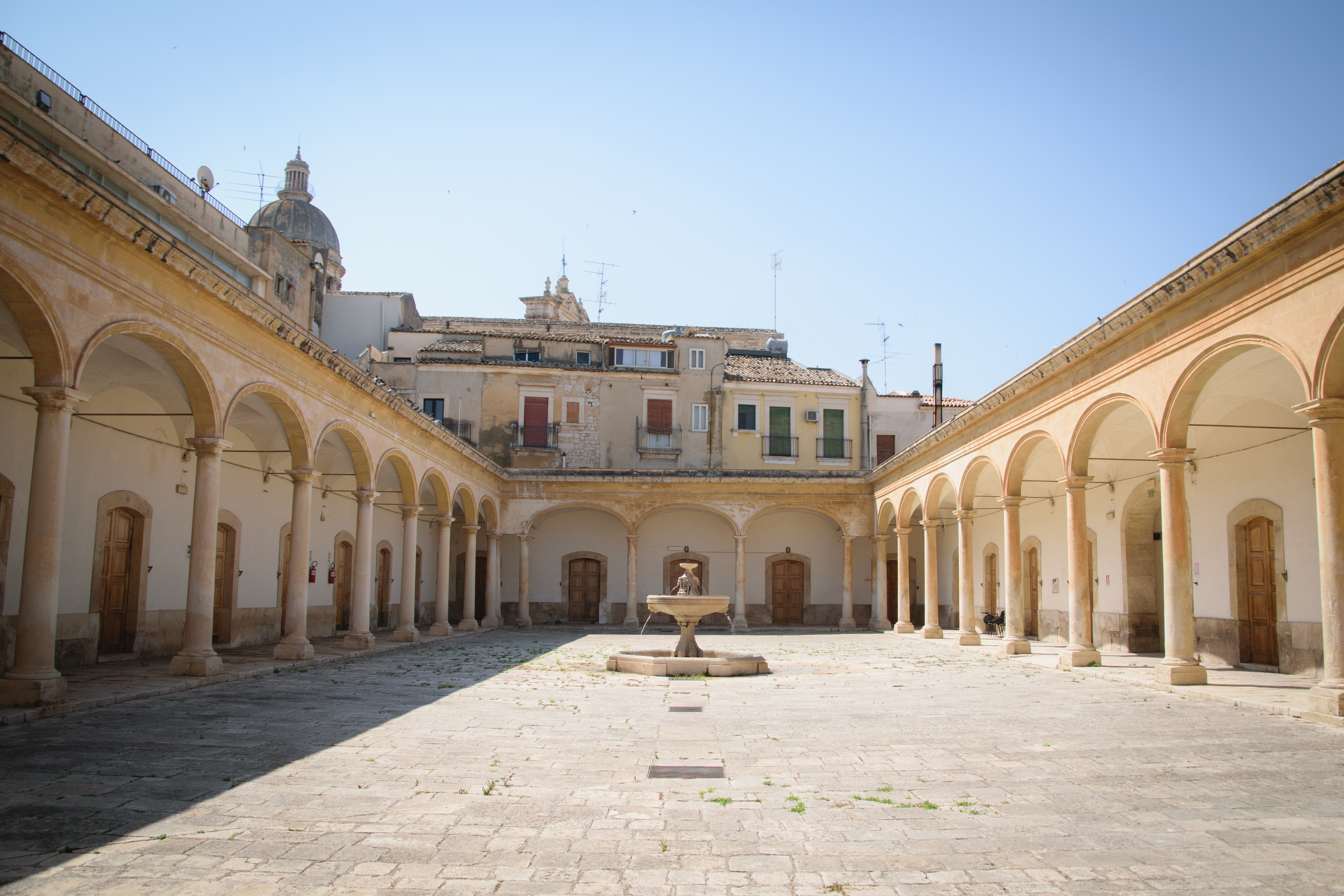
Comiso, former fish market

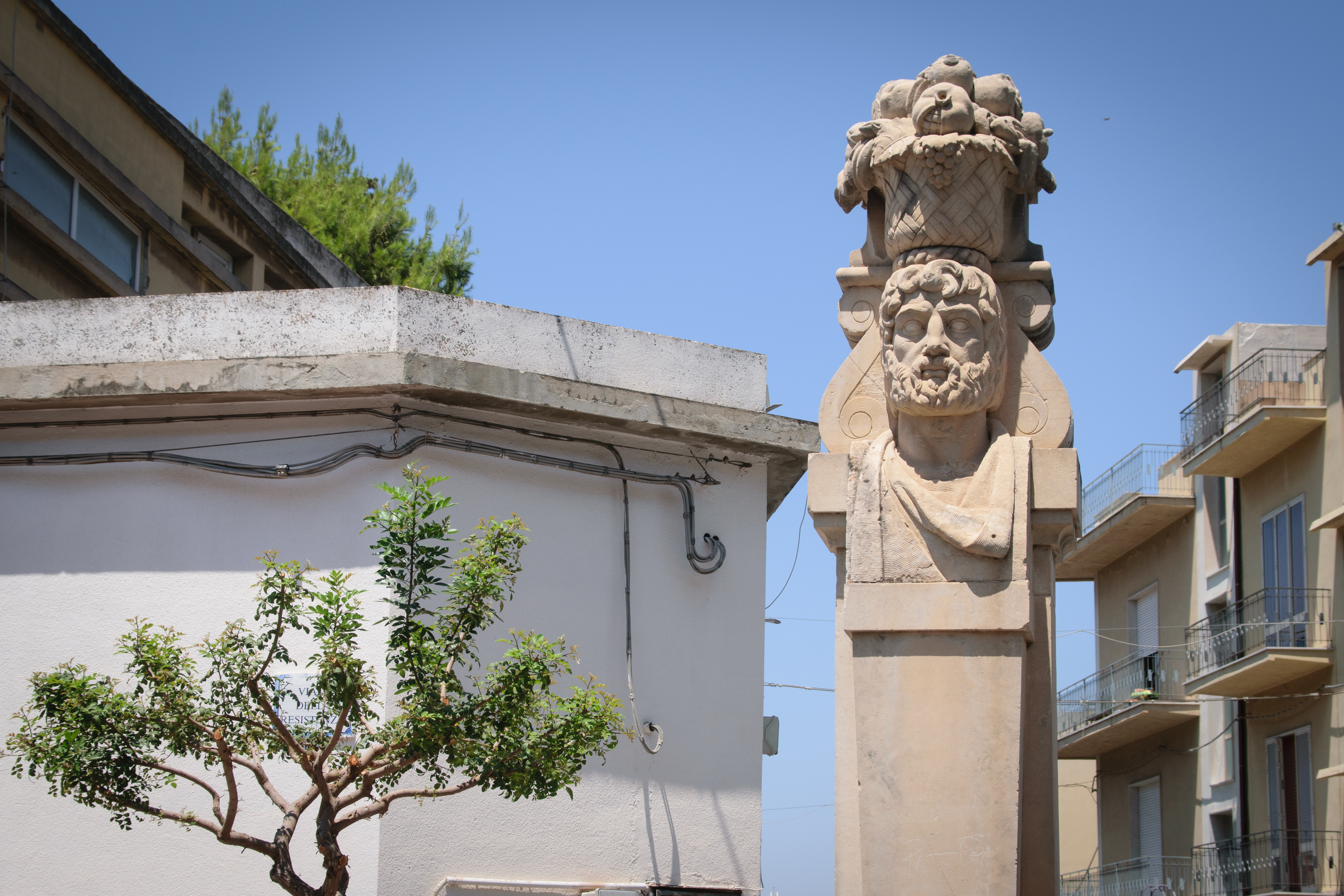
Comiso, telamone

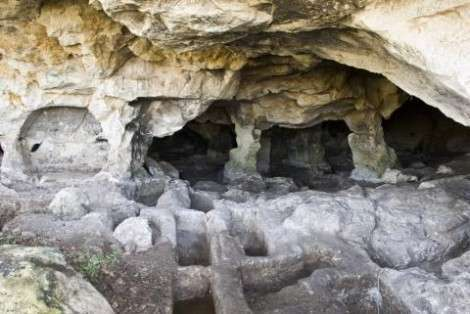
One of the caves of Cava Porcaro

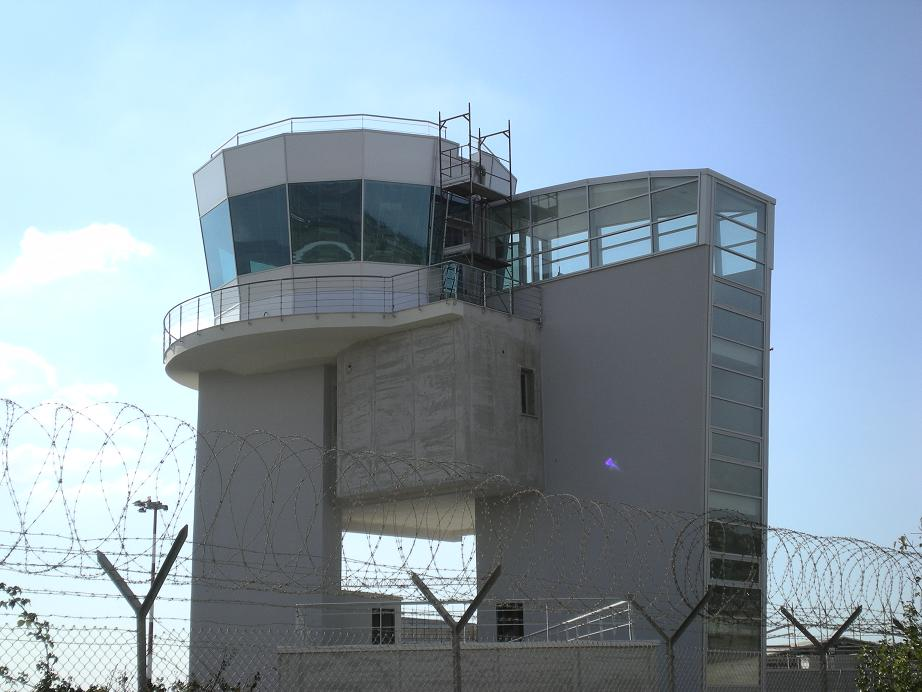
The control tower of the new airport

== See also ==
- Monti Iblei Cup (Hill Climb)
