= Mario Rutelli =

Italian sculptor

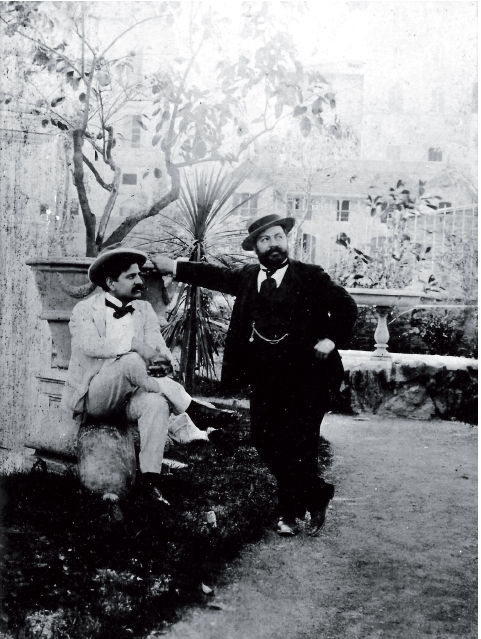
Mario Rutelli (right) with photographer Vincenzo Galdi (left) outside the sculptor's studio in via Margutta. The photo created with the self-timer in 1901.

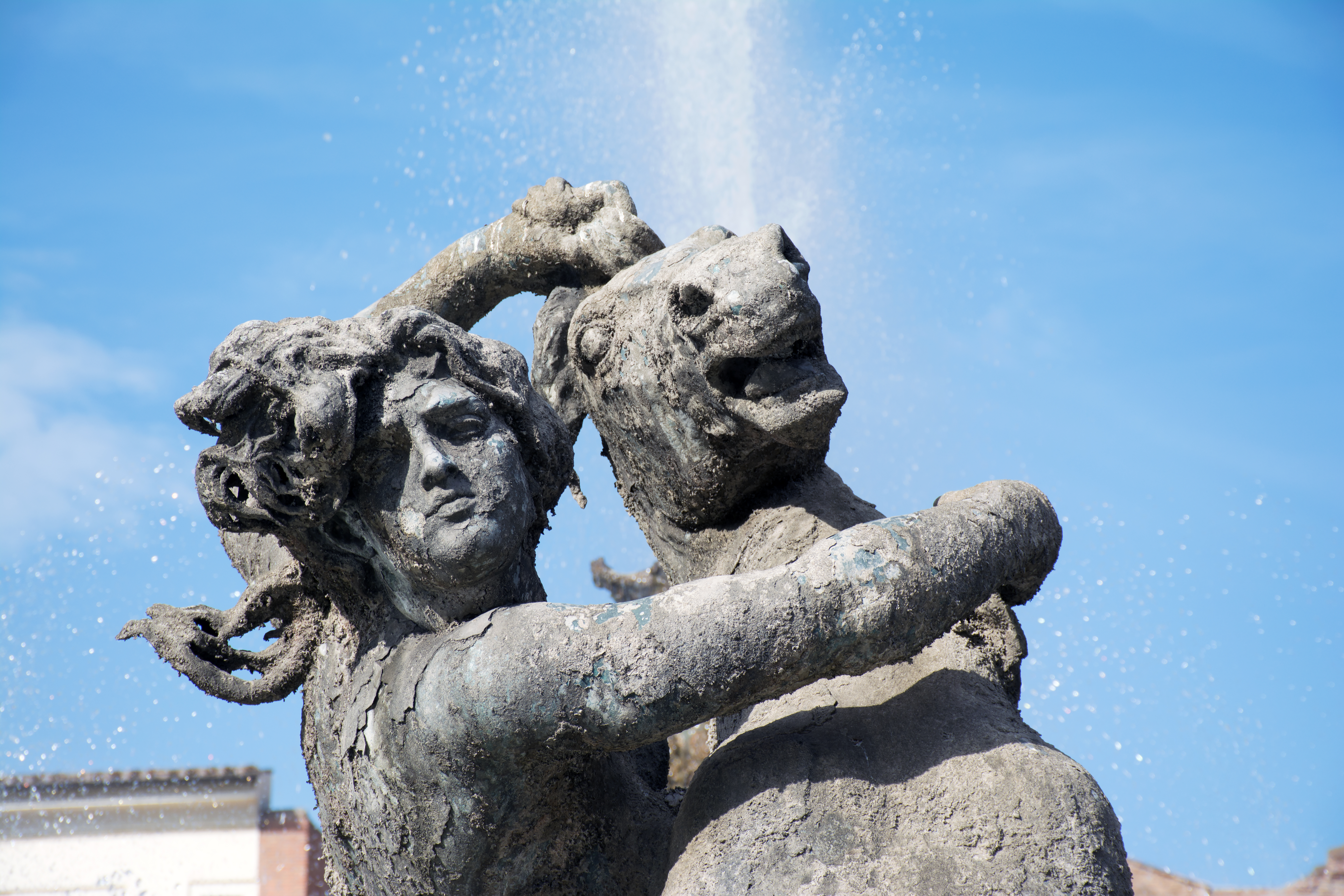
Nymph of the Oceans, Rutelli's Fountain of the Naiads, Rome

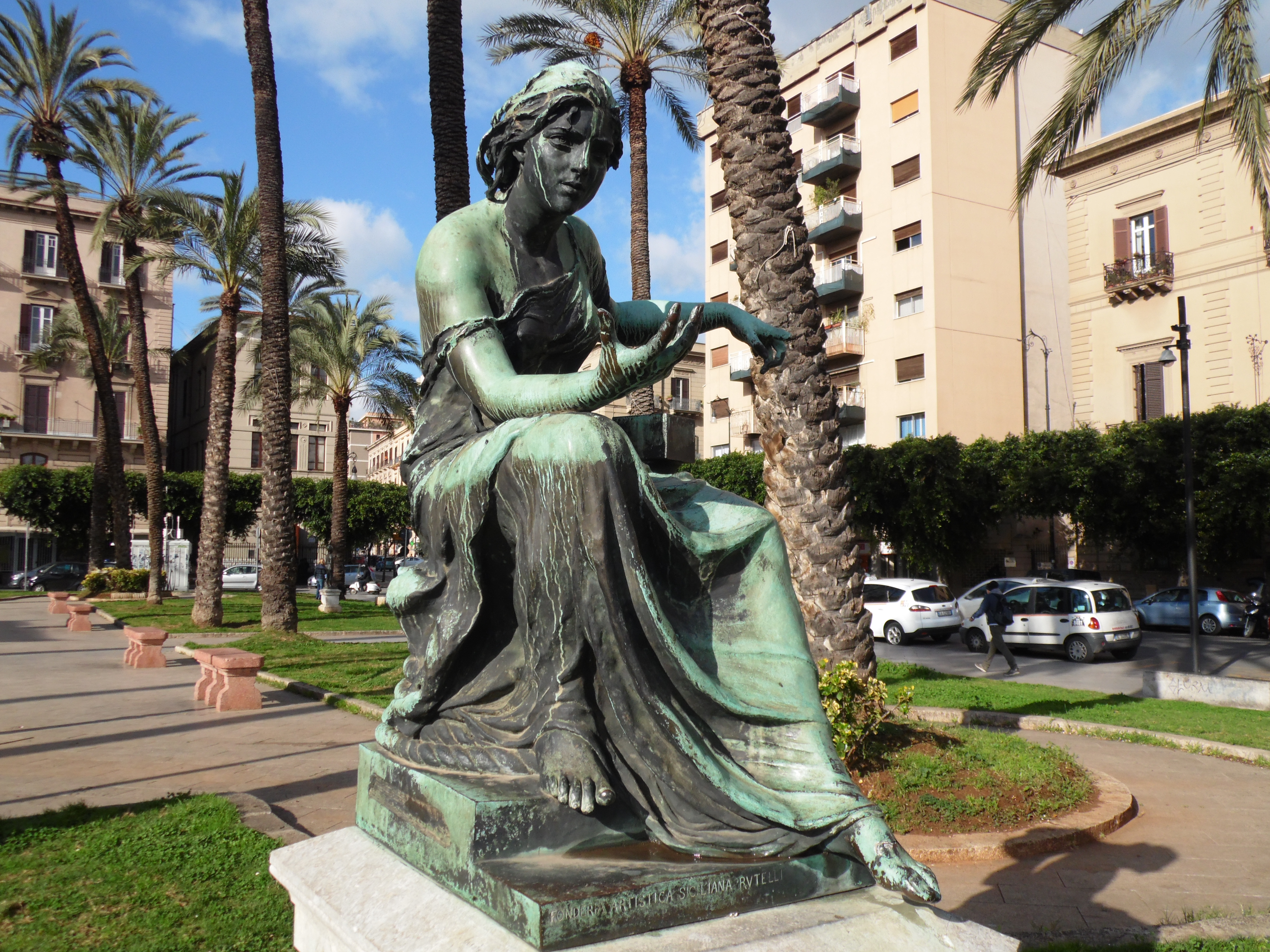
Mario Rutelli: Nautica (1895). Piazza Politeama (Palermo).

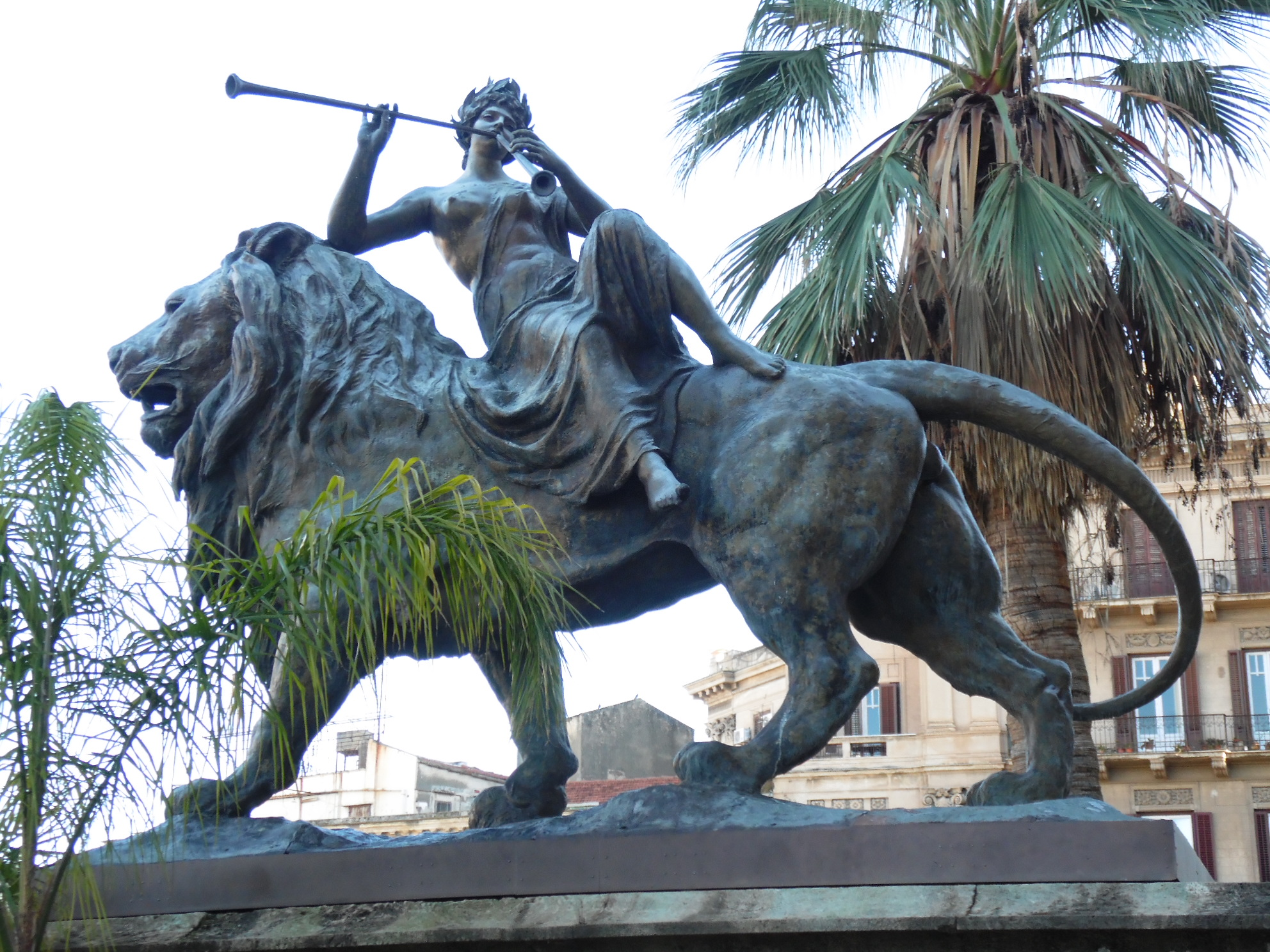
Mario Rutelli: La Lirica“. Teatro Massimo

Mario Rutelli (Palermo, Sicily, 4 April 1859 – 1941) was an Italian sculptor.

== Biography ==
From a native British family which long ago moved from France (Roudelle at first) and then to Genoa’s Republic with capt. sir G. Roudello de’ Mari di Finale Ligure, Mario's father Giovanni Rutelli was a prominent architect in Palermo. Mario studied at the Accademia di Belle Arti di Palermo and then in Rome under Giulio Monteverde and Benedetto Civiletti, and Auguste Rodin in Paris.

From 1874 through 1897 Giovanni Rutelli's firm, Rutelli and Machi', was responsible for the construction of the monumental Teatro Massimo in Palermo, the third largest lyric theatre in Europe. For his first major commission, Mario contributed a lion and allegorical group representing Lyric Poetry flanking the theater's entrance. The corresponding lion representing Tragedy is the work of Civiletti.

Rutelli's likely masterwork is the 1901 Fountain of the Naiads in Piazza della Repubblica, Rome, which Benito Mussolini called the "exaltation of eternal youth, the capital's first salute to art". The naked figures were controversial.

From 1903 to 1923 Rutelli was a professor of sculpture at his own school, the Accademia di Belle Arti di Palermo, and he also owned a foundry in via Gaetano Daita.

By the late 1920s Rutelli, who was aged 70 in 1929, could be described as "the oldest, most established, and most traditional of all Italian commemorative sculptors" of the time. For the Anita Garibaldi Monument, one of the statues and monuments of patriots on the Janiculum, Mussolini personally selected Rutelli for the commission, after rejecting designs by sculptor Ettore Ferrari. Reportedly Mussolini visited Rutelli's studio at least once to approve the design, and ordered that Anita be holding her weapon in one hand and her infant son Menotti in the other. The statues also form Garibaldi's tomb: the base holds her remains.

Rutelli is buried in the Cimitero di Sant'Orsola in Palermo. His great-grandson is the Italian politician and former mayor of Rome Francesco Rutelli.

== Selected works ==
- Bronze quadriga on the Teatro Politeama in Palermo, with Apollo (the god of music) and Euterpe (the muse of lyric poetry) above it (1867–1874)
- Lion and allegorical group, Lyric Poetry, Teatro Massimo, Palermo (1874–1897)
- Fontana del Tritone, Piazza Vittorio Emanuele, Monreale (1881)
- Fontana delle Naiadi in Piazza della Repubblica, Rome (1901; revisions through 1912)
- Monument to Nicola Spedalieri in the Piazza Sforza Cesarini, in Rome (1903)
- Monument to Francesco Crispi, Piazza Crispi, Palermo (1905)
- One of the Victories on the Altare della Patria in Rome (inaugurated 1911)
- Marble font, Neoclassicist Church of the Annunziata, Comiso (1912)
- Peace, Tabernacle Chapel, Aberystwyth, Wales (1921)
- War memorial in Aberystwyth, Wales (1921–1923)
- Bronze statue of Edward Albert, Prince of Wales, later King Edward VIII, forecourt of Old College, Aberystwyth University, Aberystwyth, Wales (1923) (the only known full-length sculpture of the subject).
- Monument to Anita Garibaldi on the Janiculum, a two-figure equestrian bronze with extensive deep-relief bronze panels on the base (1929)
- The lion at the base of the Garibaldi monument in the Garibaldi garden in Palermo
- Monument to Giuseppe Gioeni (1920) on the facade of the Palazzo Gioeni Asmundo in Catania
- The equestrian monument to Umberto I in Catania
- The Fountain and commemorative monument at Agrigento
- Busts of Domenico Morelli and Giuseppe Maielli
- A bronze group of children playing in a fountain, and a bust of Edmondo De Amicis, situated in Palermo's English Garden
- Bust of Sicilian botanist Bernardino da Ucria, Orto botanico di Palermo
- Bust of Sicilian, Giuseppe Cantavespri; distinguished citizen of Bisacquino

== Gallery ==
Fountain of the Naiads, Rome

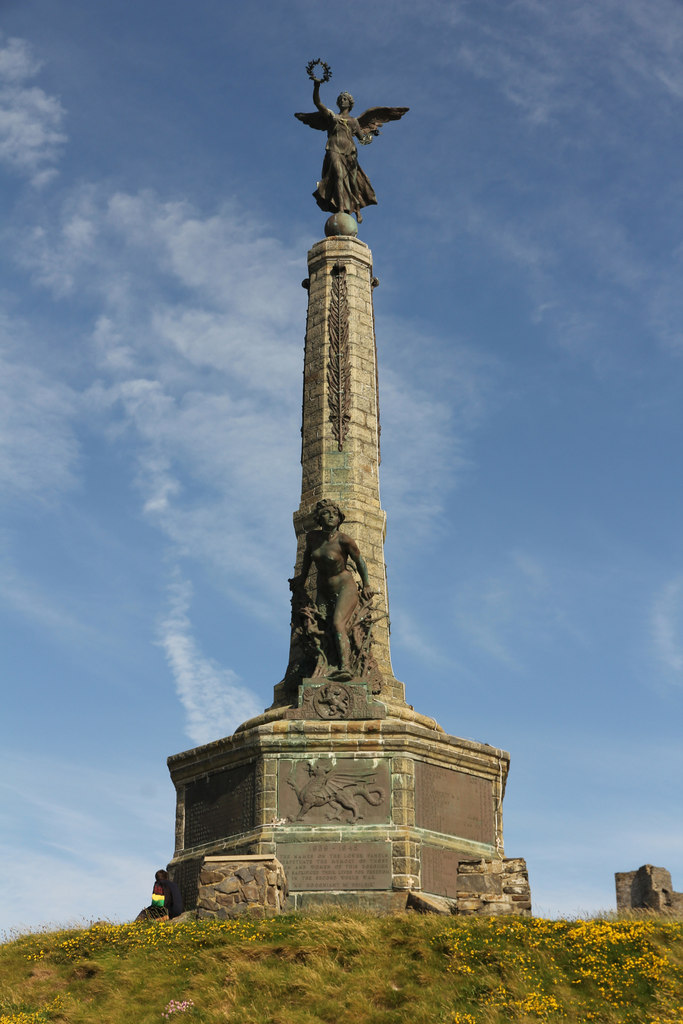
The war memorial at Aberystwyth seafront. The bottom figure represents Humanity and the top Victory

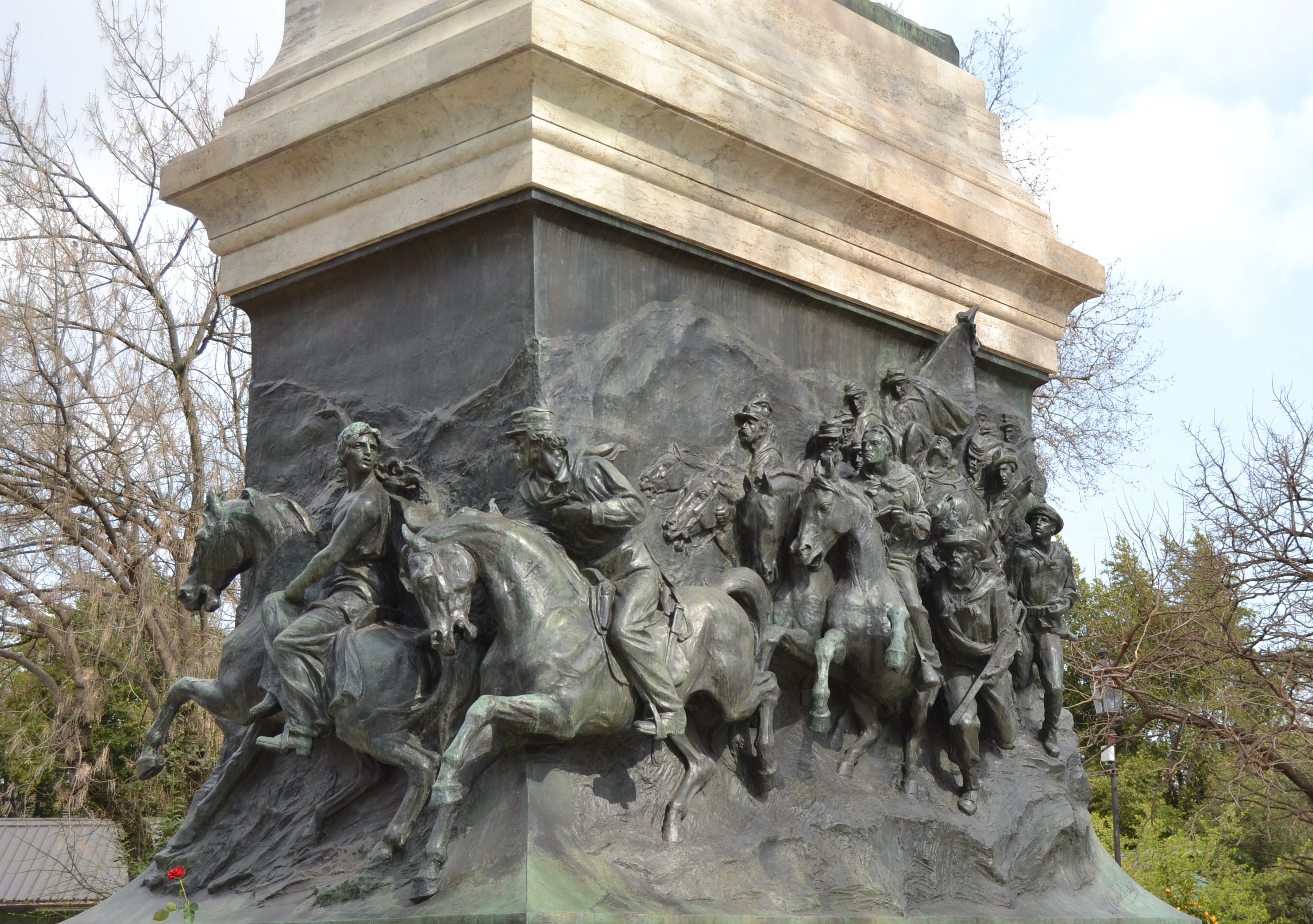
Bas-relief on base, Anita Garibaldi Monument, Janiculum
