= Manfredo Manfredi =

Italian architect (1859–1927)

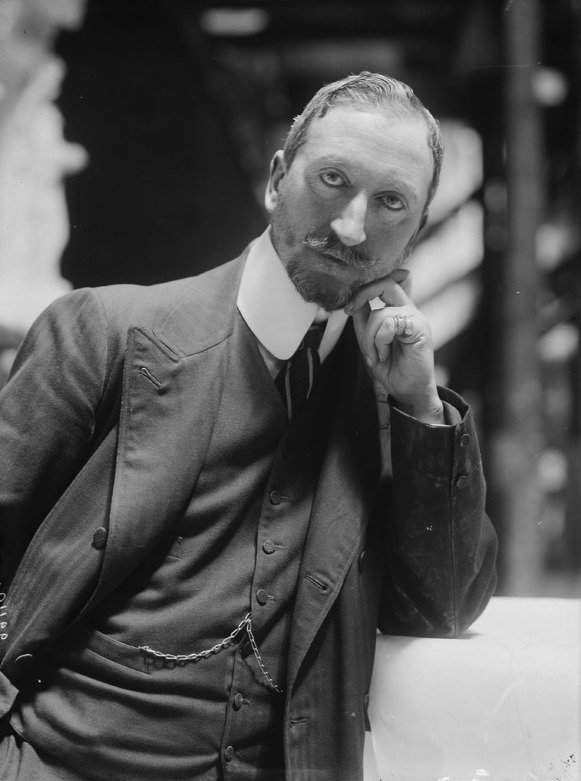

Member of the Chamber of Deputies
- In office 1908–1919

Personal details
- Born: 16 April 1859 Piacenza, Kingdom of Italy
- Died: 13 October 1927 (aged 68) Piacenza, Italy
- Party: PLI
- Profession: Architect, politician

Manfredo Manfredi (Italian: [maɱˈfreːdo maɱˈfreːdi]; 16 April 1859 – 13 October 1927) was an Italian architect.

In 1880, Manfredi began his studies at the Accademia di belle arti di Roma (Academy of Fine Arts in Rome). In 1884 he came in second in the architectural competition for the monument now known as the Altare della Patria to honour Victor Emmanuel. When the winning architect Giuseppe Sacconi died in 1905, Manfredi, Gaetano Koch and Pio Piacentini were appointed to oversee the completion of the monument.

Manfredi helped found the Scuola Superiore di Architettura in Rome and was its director from 1908 to 1920. He was also involved in politics and was an elected member of the Parliament of Italy between 1909 and 1919.

== Notable projects ==
- Monument to the Independence of Brazil in São Paulo (1922)
- Tomb of Victor Emmanuel in the Pantheon, Rome
- Italian pavilions at universal expositions in Chicago (1893), Antwerp (1894), Paris (1900)
- Lighthouse monument on the Janiculum
