= Stile Umbertino =

Italian architectural style of the late 19th century

The stile Umbertino is a 19th-century style of Renaissance Revival architecture in Italy, typical of the eclecticism of late 19th century architecture and decorative arts in Europe, which mixes decorative elements from various historical styles.

The Umbertine style takes its name from King Umberto I, who reigned over the Kingdom of Italy from 1878 until 1900. The stile Umbertino includes architecture, furniture and other decorative arts. The stile Umbertino was most popular in Rome.

== History ==
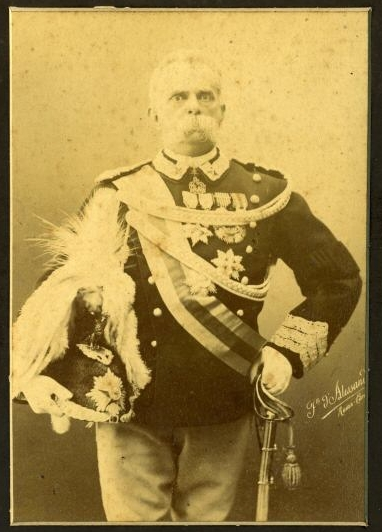
A portrait of Umberto I circa 1890

The stile Umbertino is the Italian version of Eclecticism, a style of architecture and decorative arts common in Europe in the second half of the 19th century, and that combines in one building features from different artistic periods and repertoires.

The Italian version differs from the general European style by aspiring to be distinctively Italian. This happened largely in the decades immediately following Italian unification, as one of the many attempts to build a national sense of unity. It came to be applied often on buildings housing governmental bodies, such as ministries and law courts, as well as on palaces and villas for the establishment, especially in Rome, which became in 1870 the new capital of the Kingdom. Here the city council and the government developed an ambitious and grand plan to redevelop the city and endow it with infrastructures fit for its status of capital. The stile Umbertino gained in popularity after 1870 and dwindled around 1895. However, it remained in use for governmental buildings well into the first and second decades of the 20th century.

== Characteristics ==
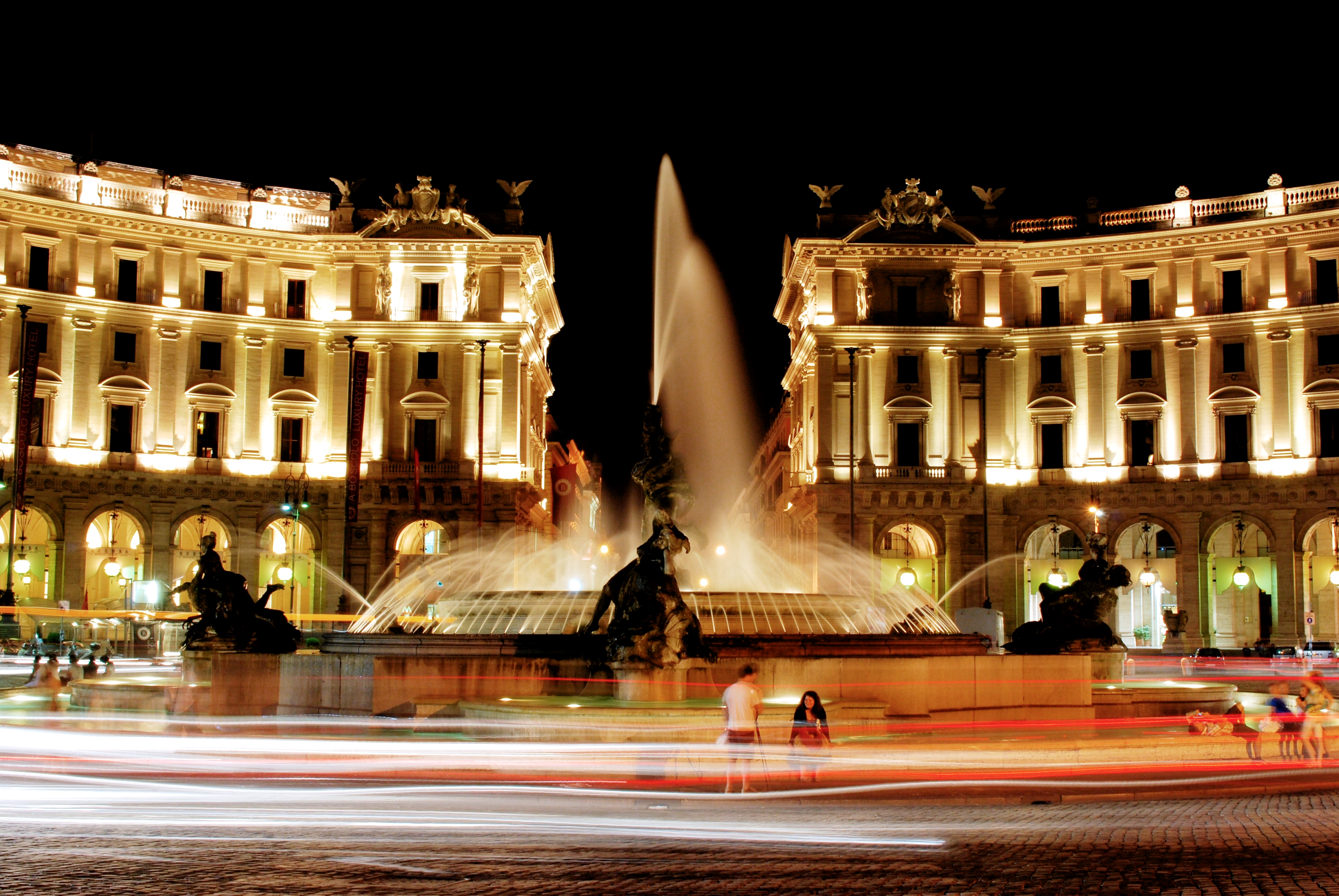
Piazza della Repubblica

Similarly to other versions of 19th century Eclecticism, the Umbertino style draws inspiration from several periods of art history. It distinguishes itself by its particularly conservative interpretation of Eclecticism, aiming to develop a truly national style. This later came to be identified in an academic and conventional Renaissance Revival repertoire, with elements drawn from the Baroque period and the early Renaissance.

== Notable examples ==
Due to the rapid growth of population in late 19th century Italy, as well as the need of the new national government to make its mark in the cities of the new Kingdom, examples of stile Umbertino can be found in all of Italy's major cities. Rome, in particular, boasts several architectural ensembles built in this style, being particularly favoured for governmental infrastructures.

Notable Umberto I style buildings:

- Piazza della Repubblica, Florence (1870)
- Galleria Vittorio Emanuele II, Milan (1878)
- Palazzo delle Esposizioni, Rome (1883)
- Palace of Justice, Rome (1885)
- Palazzo Margherita, Rome (1886)
- Porticoes of Piazza della Repubblica, Rome (1887)
- Palazzo Koch, Rome (1888)
- Galleria Umberto I, Naples (1890)
- Palazzo del Viminale, Rome (1911)

== Gallery ==
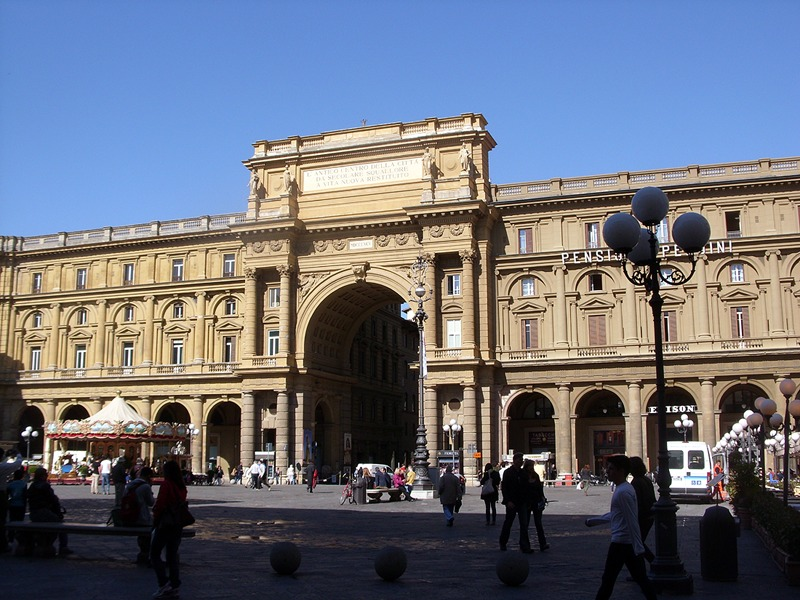
Piazza della Repubblica, Florence (1865)

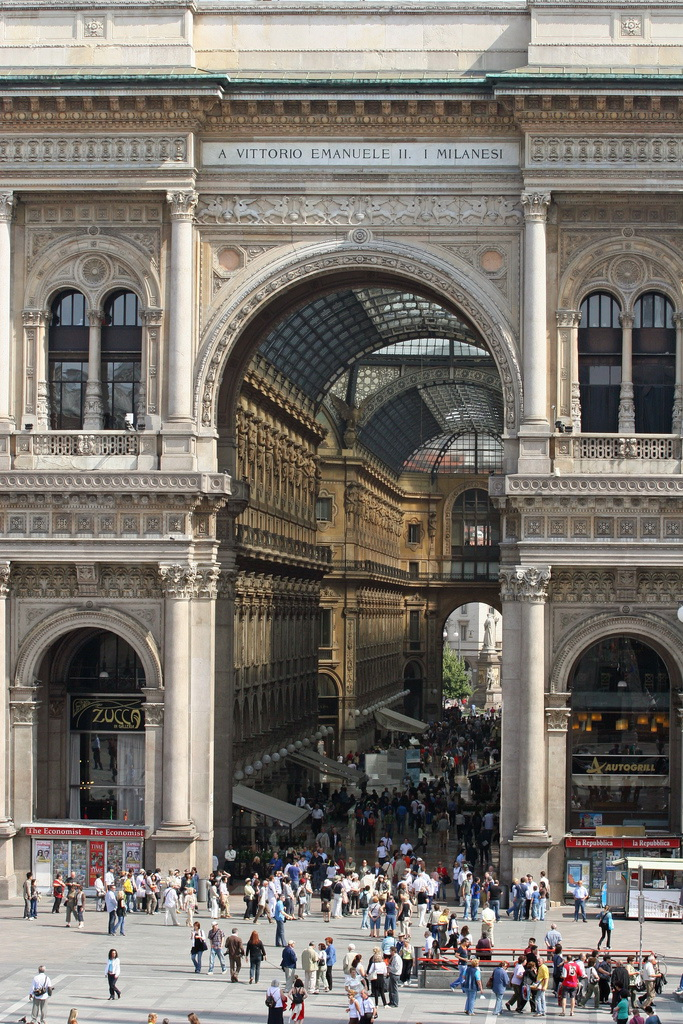
Galleria Vittorio Emanuele II, Milan (1877)

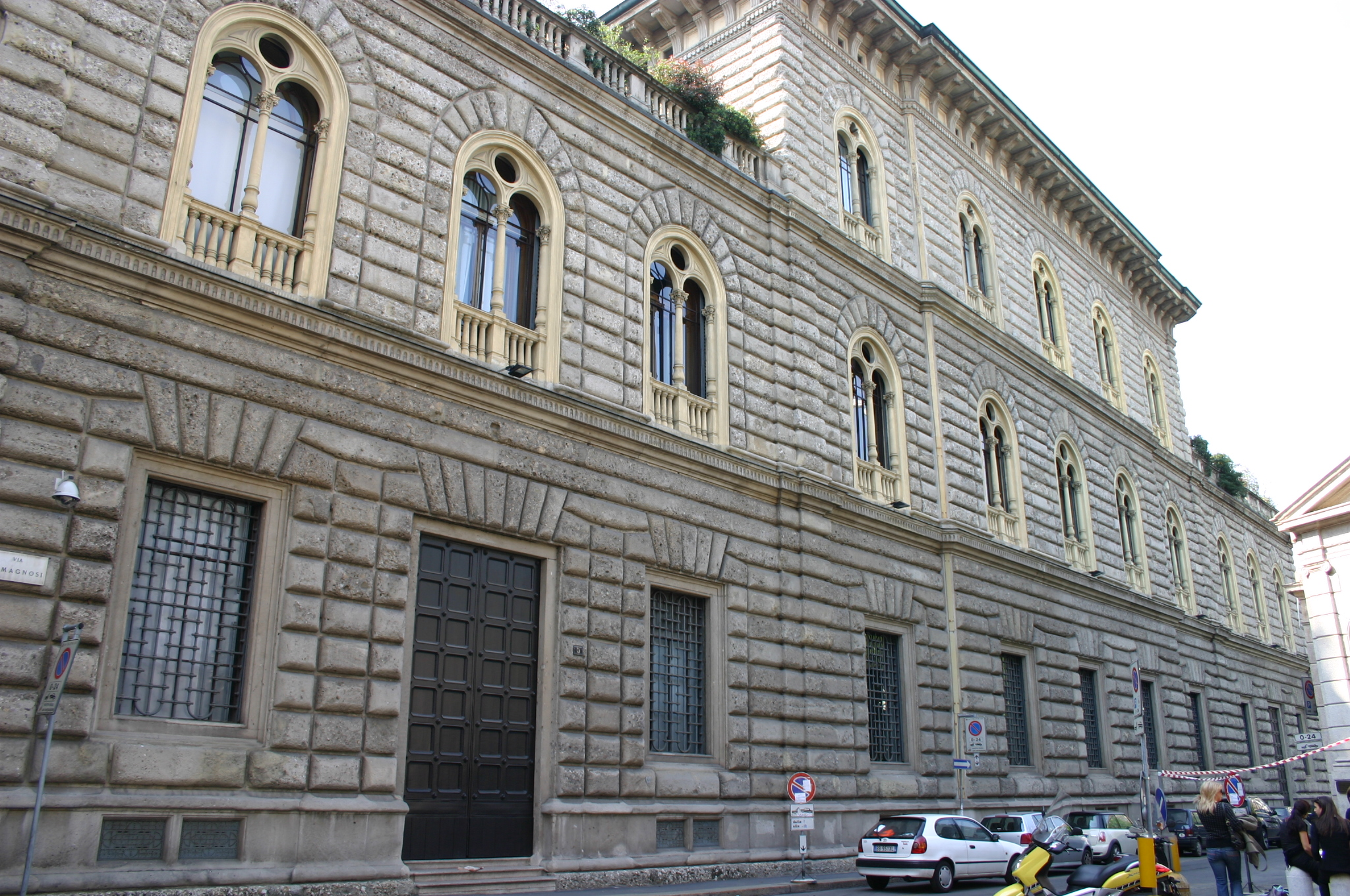
Ca de sass, Milan (1878)

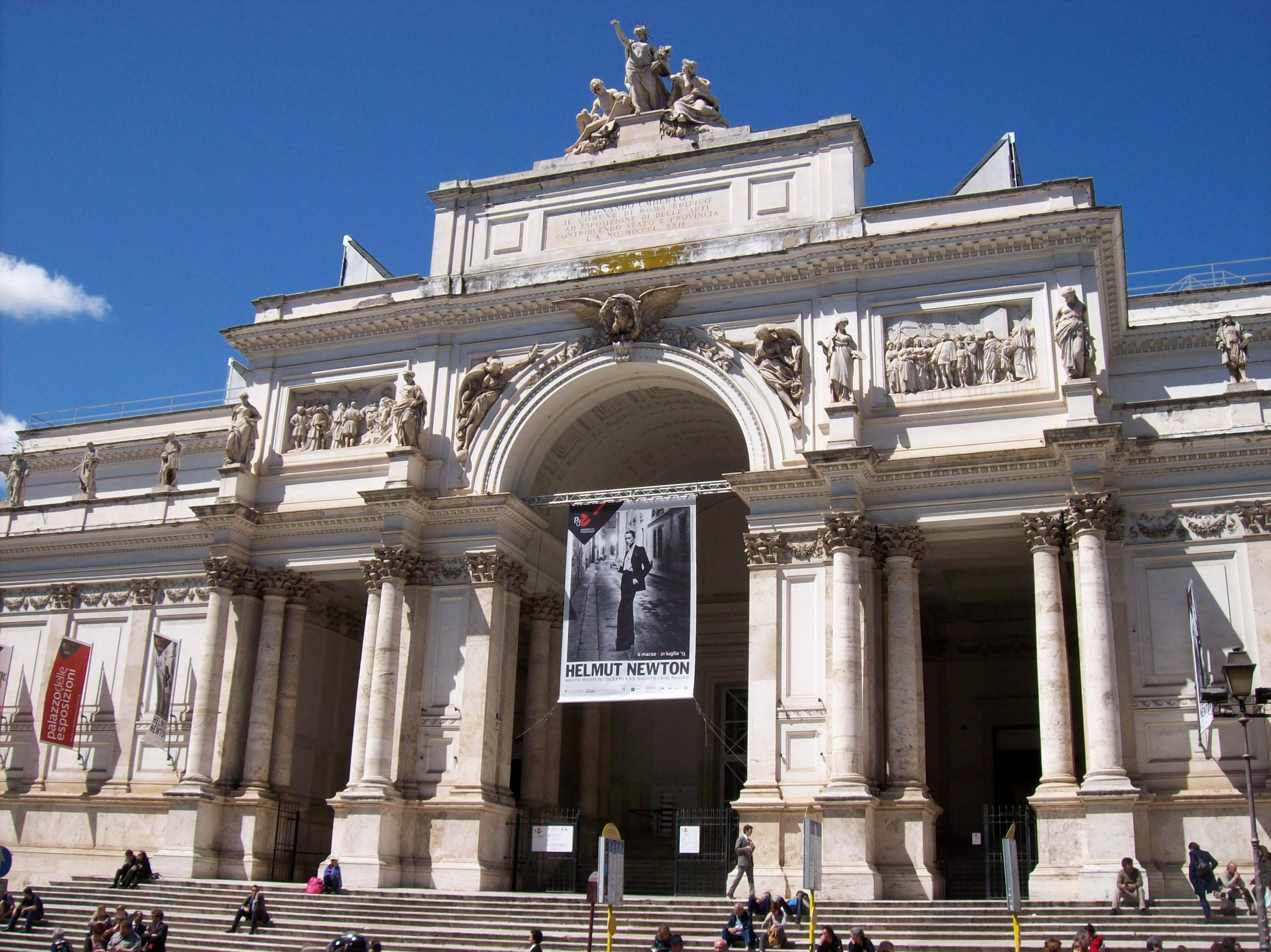
Palazzo delle Esposizioni, Rome (1883)

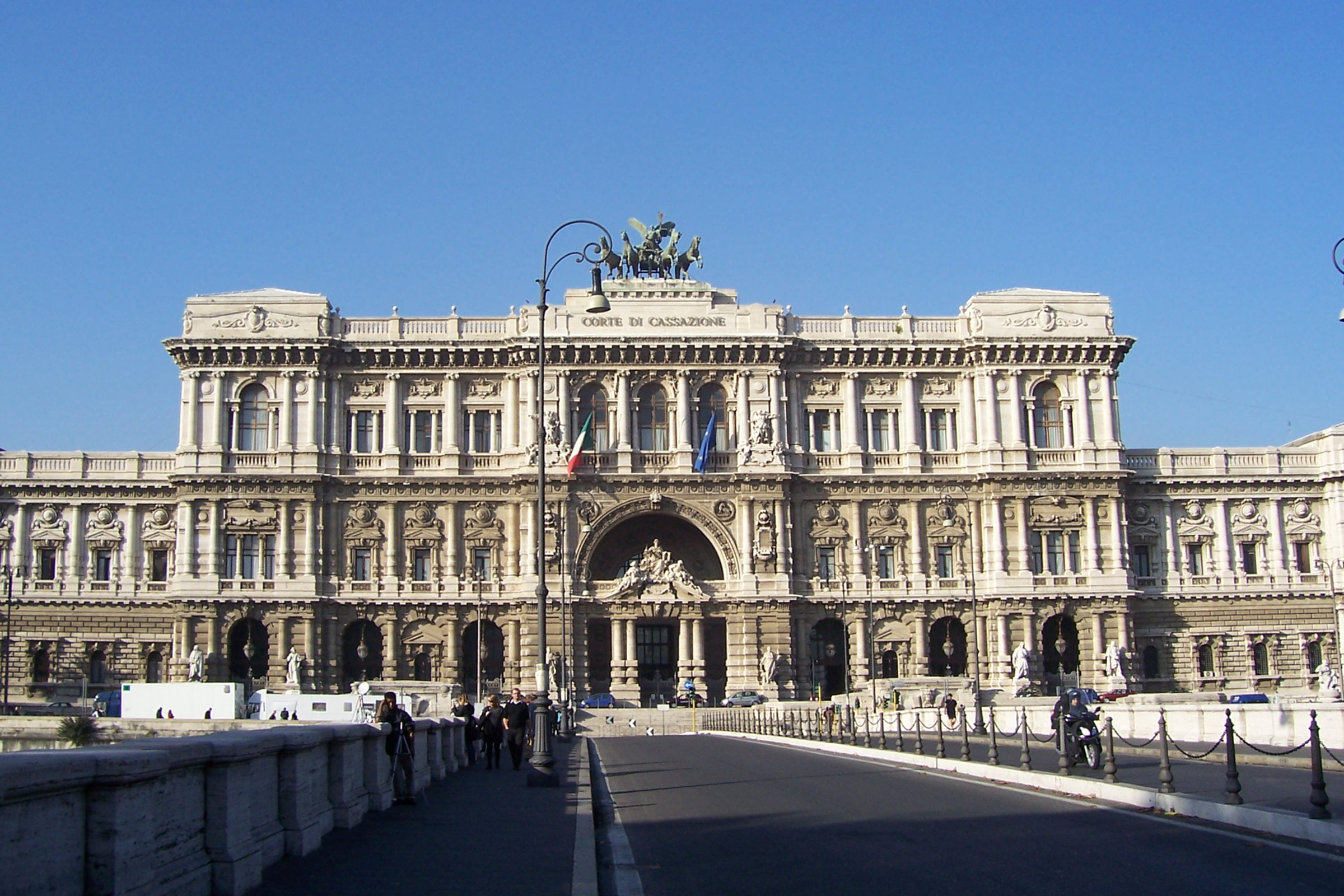
Palace of Justice, Rome (1885)

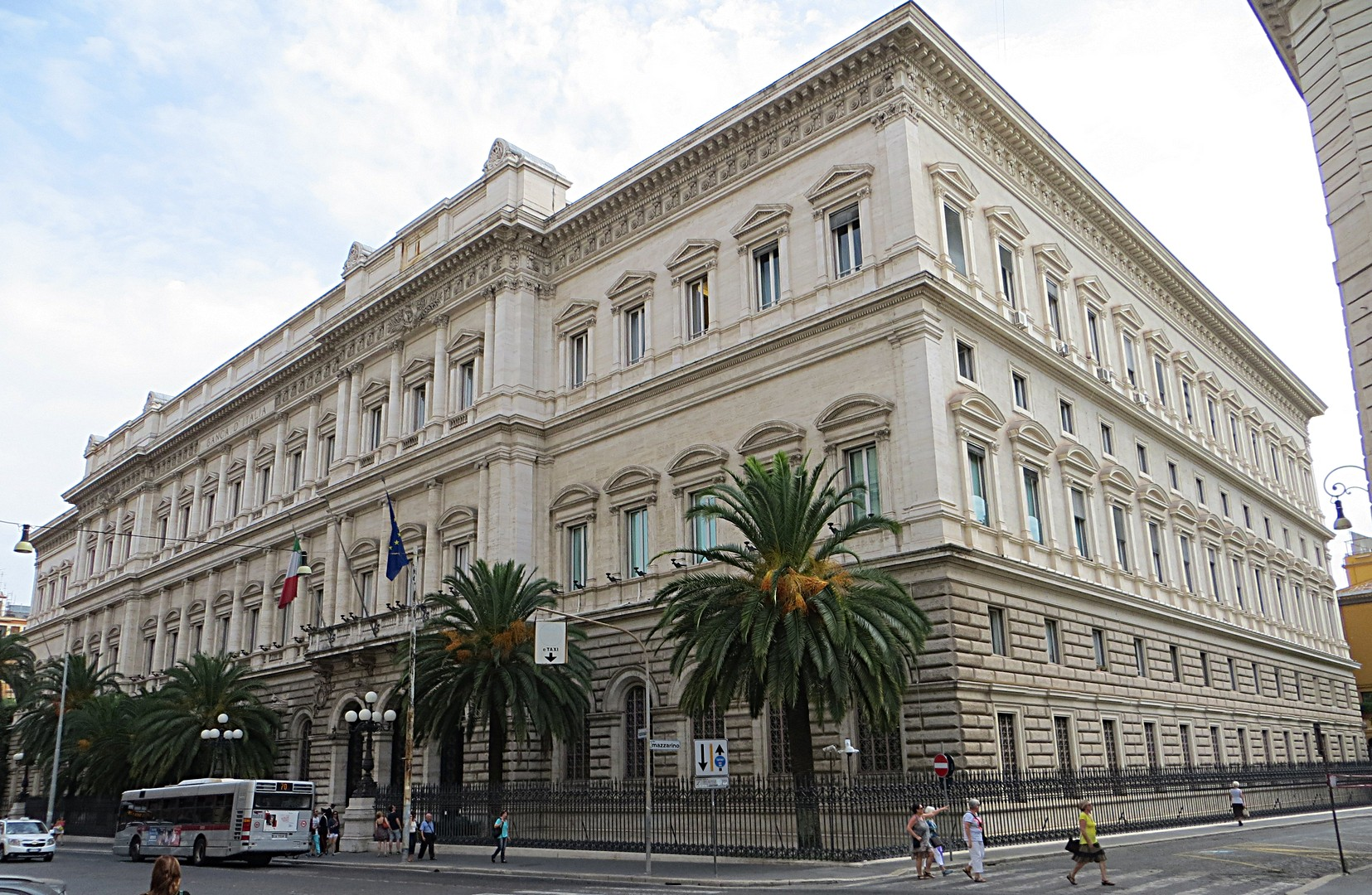
Palazzo Koch, Rome (1888)

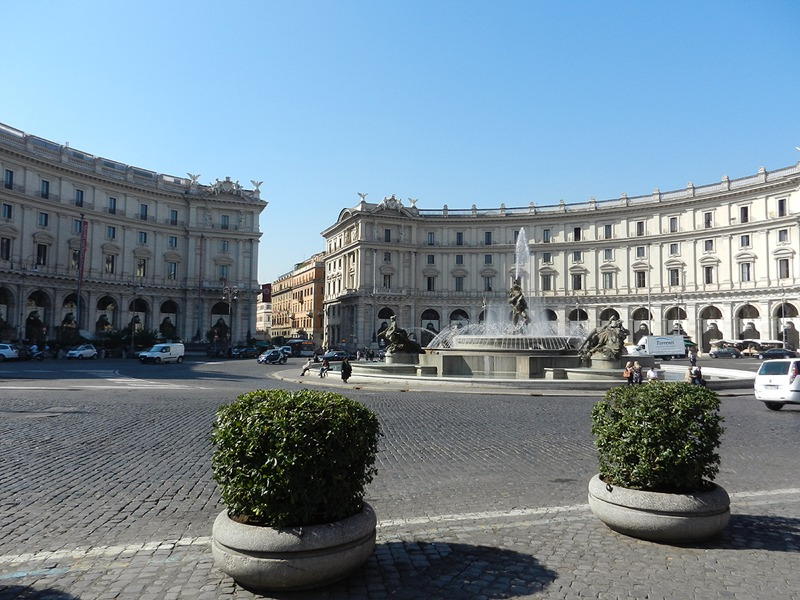
Piazza della Repubblica, Rome (1888)

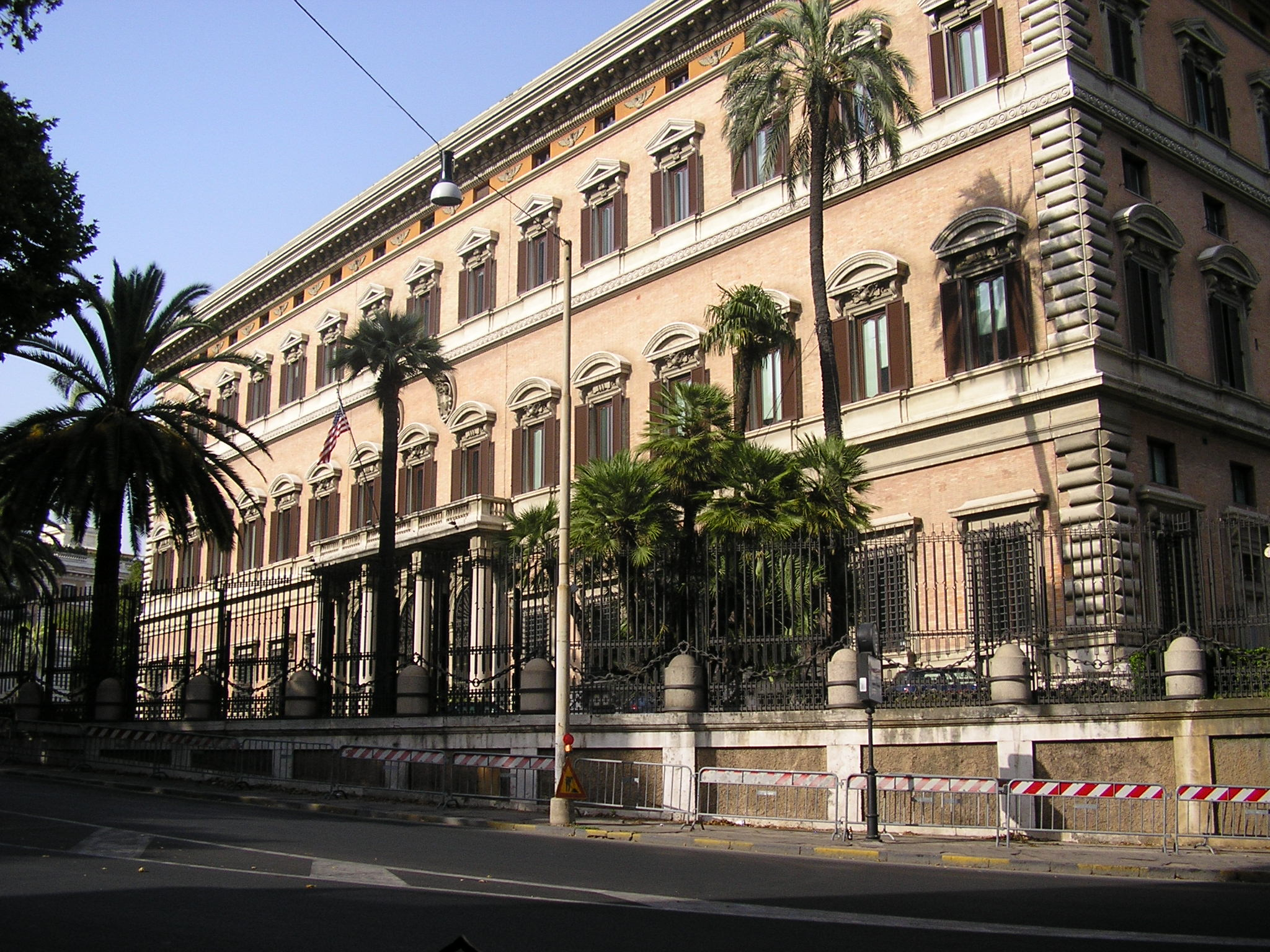
Palazzo Margherita, Rome (1890)

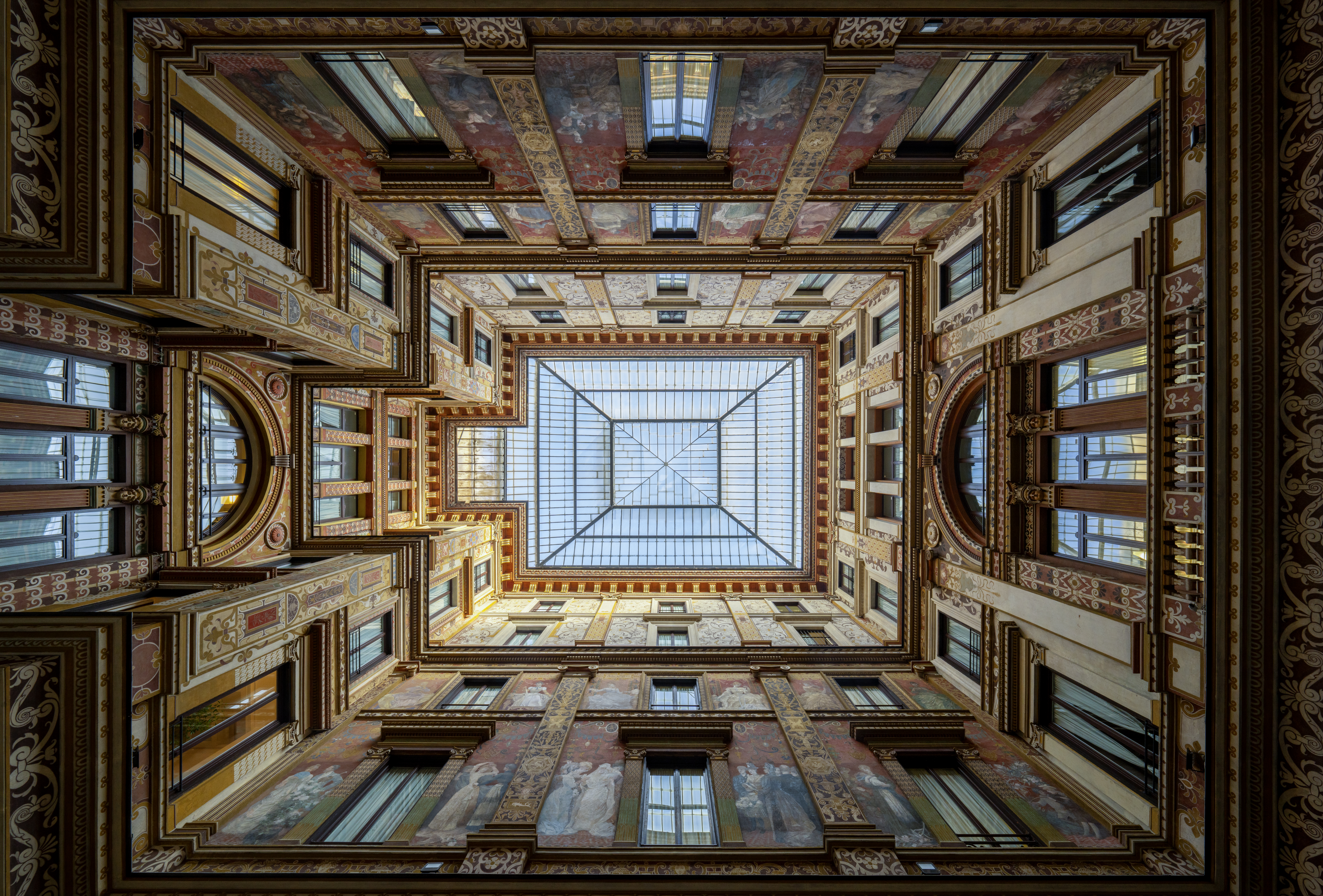
Galleria Sciarra, Rome (1890)

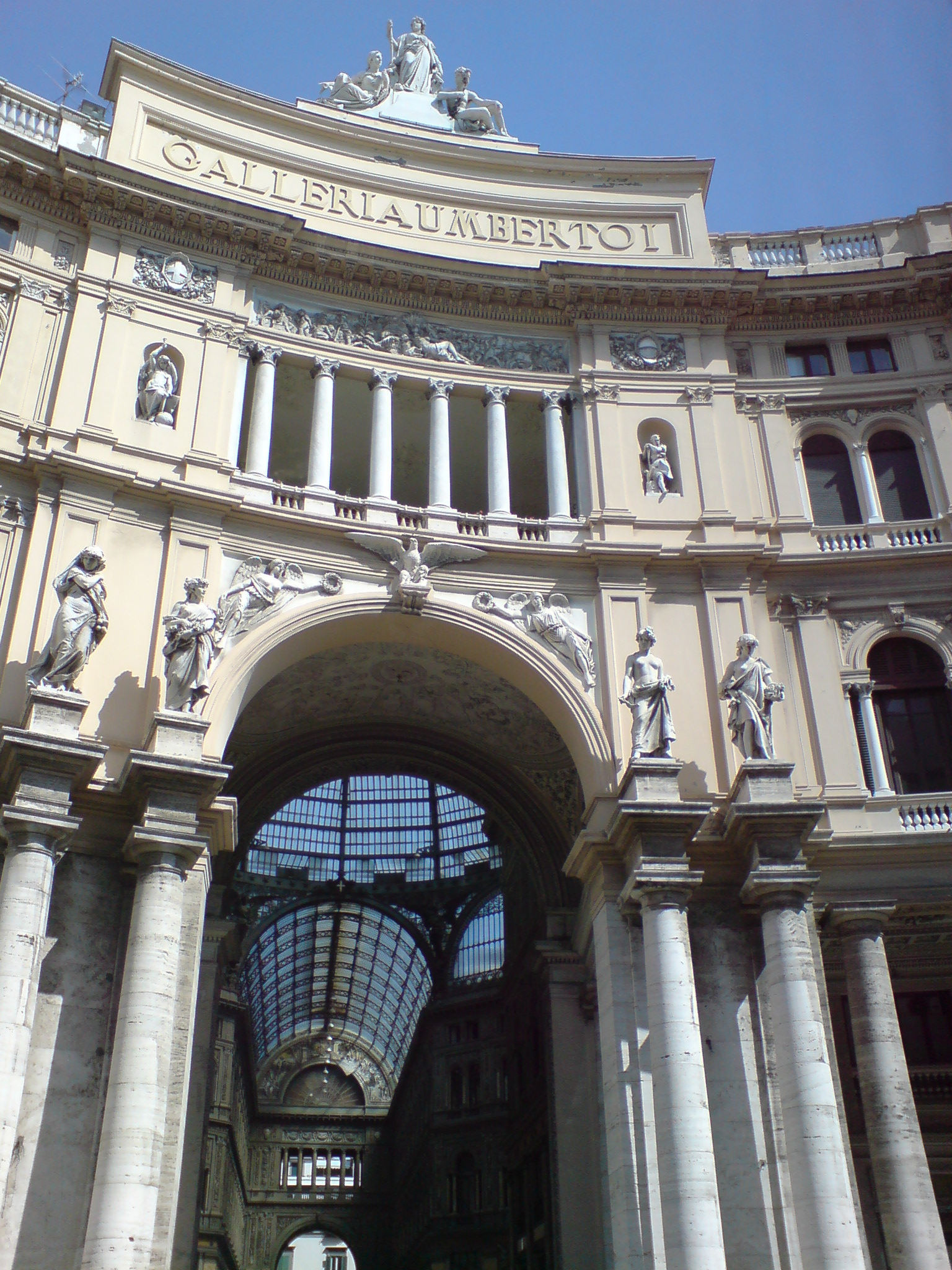
Galleria Umberto I, Naples (1890)
