= Pio Piacentini =

Italian architect (1846–1928)

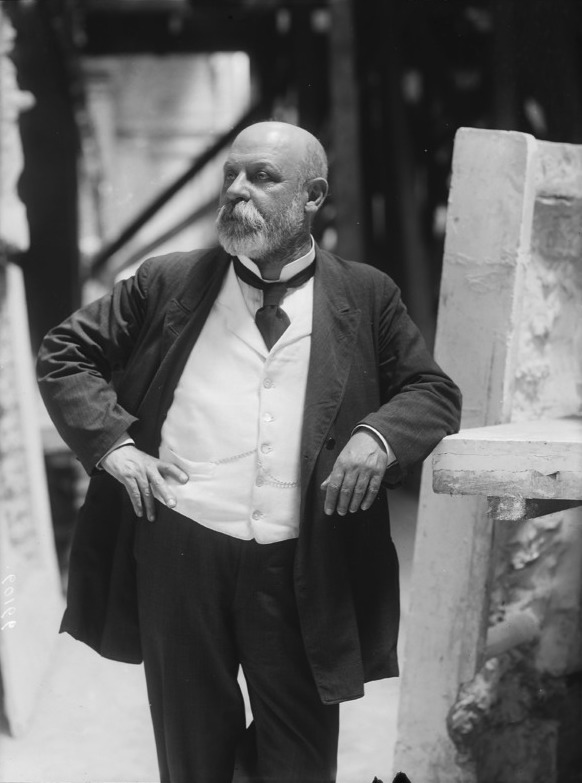
- Pio Piacentini
- Born: 15 September 1846; Rome, Papal States
- Died: 6 April 1928 (aged 81); Rome, Kingdom of Italy
- Occupation: Architect
- Movement: Eclecticism
- Buildings: Palazzo delle Esposizioni

Pio Piacentini (15 September 1846 – 6 April 1928) was an Italian architect and the father of Marcello Piacentini. His works include the Palazzo delle Esposizioni (1883), the Rinascente palace (1920), the monumental entrance to Villa Sciarra, and Palazzo Piacentini (finished after his death, in 1932). He also directed the construction works of the Vittoriano since 1905, together with Manfredo Manfredi and Gaetano Koch.

== Life ==
Pio Piacentini was born in Rome on 15 September 1846. He received his architectural training at the Accademia di San Luca, graduating in 1867; afterwards he practised in Virginio Vespignani’s office in Rome. His unusual and highly eclectic work, influenced by Renaissance Revival architecture and by the innovative work of his French contemporary Charles Garnier, was evident in his first major design, for the Palazzo delle Esposizioni on the Via Nazionale in Rome.

In January 1878, Piacentini won the second competition for the Palazzo, the first competition having failed to specify the building’s exact location and the proposed budget. The success of his plan, which bore the motto ‘Sit quod vis simplex et unum’, meant that at the age of 33 Piacentini had already obtained the commission for an important building, the function and location of which, next to the church of San Vitale, earned him considerable fame and prestige.

Preceded by a sweeping flight of steps, the façade of the Palazzo is characterized by the great space of the Serlian entrance archway, which, rather than accentuating its role as a triumphal entrance, seems to introduce a dramatic pause in the compact mass that stands behind it. Conscious of the prestige and theatricality of the Palazzo, which was completed in 1882, Piacentini also devised a far-reaching plan for the layout of the surrounding area, suggesting a link with the Quirinale across a garden in order to enhance the monumentality of the Palazzo. This remained unexecuted, however.

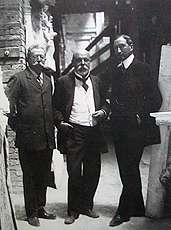
Piacentini (center), with fellow architects Gaetano Koch (left) and Manfredo Manfredi (right)

An invitation in 1882 to take part in the competition for the design of the Banca Nazionale, Rome, indicated the reputation that Piacentini had acquired through his design for the Palazzo. It was Gaetano Koch, however, who eventually won this commission.

The Palazzo Sforza-Cesarini (1886) on Corso Vittorio Emanuele reveals Piacentini’s desire to broaden his own interpretation of Renaissance canons but is one of his less successful designs. His restless desire to experiment with new expressive forms also led him, in the case of San Giovanni Berchmans (1889), in Via degli Etruschi, to adopt a sort of affected Romanesque Revival style.

His most successful late design was another monumental building, the headquarters of the Ministry of Justice on Via Arenula, also in Rome, which again involved a major work of urban planning. Lying between Via del Melangolo, Via Arenula and Via degli Strengari, the building’s design accommodated the differing characters of these streets. For example, the ground-plan follows a curved line to contain the buildings of the Regola district along Via degli Strengari. The important medieval group of buildings known as the ‘Casa di San Paolo’ was therefore incorporated and preserved in the design for the Ministry building. The frontage on to Via Arenula, however, has a monumental façade, reflecting the different context and perspective provided by that area. Built in stages from 1911, the building was, according to some critics, a sympathetic response to current Roman environmentalist concerns. The decoration of the building was inspired by an archaic version of Quattrocento styles. Piacentini’s son Marcello Piacentini was also actively involved in this project, which was completed only in 1929.

== Select works ==
- Chiesa del Santissimo Rosario di Pompei
- Palazzo De Carolis-Simonetti
- Palazzo Malvezzi Campeggi
- Palazzo Piacentini
- Palazzo del Banco di Santo Spirito
- Palazzo della Rinascente
- Palazzo delle Esposizioni
- Palazzo Muti-Cesi-Berardi
- Palazzo Sforza-Cesarini o Cancelleria Vecchia
- Traforo Umberto I
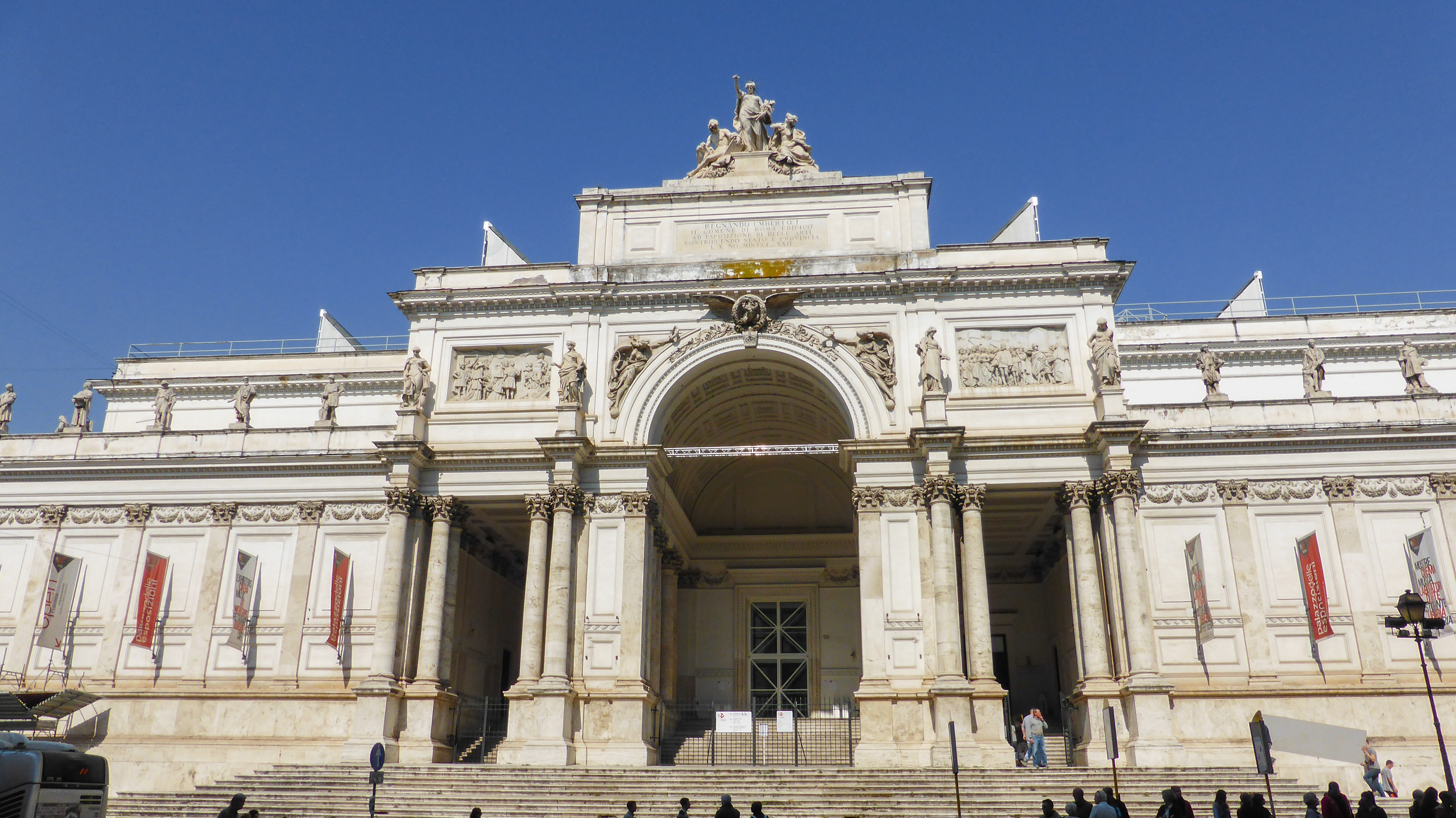
Palazzo delle Esposizioni, Rome

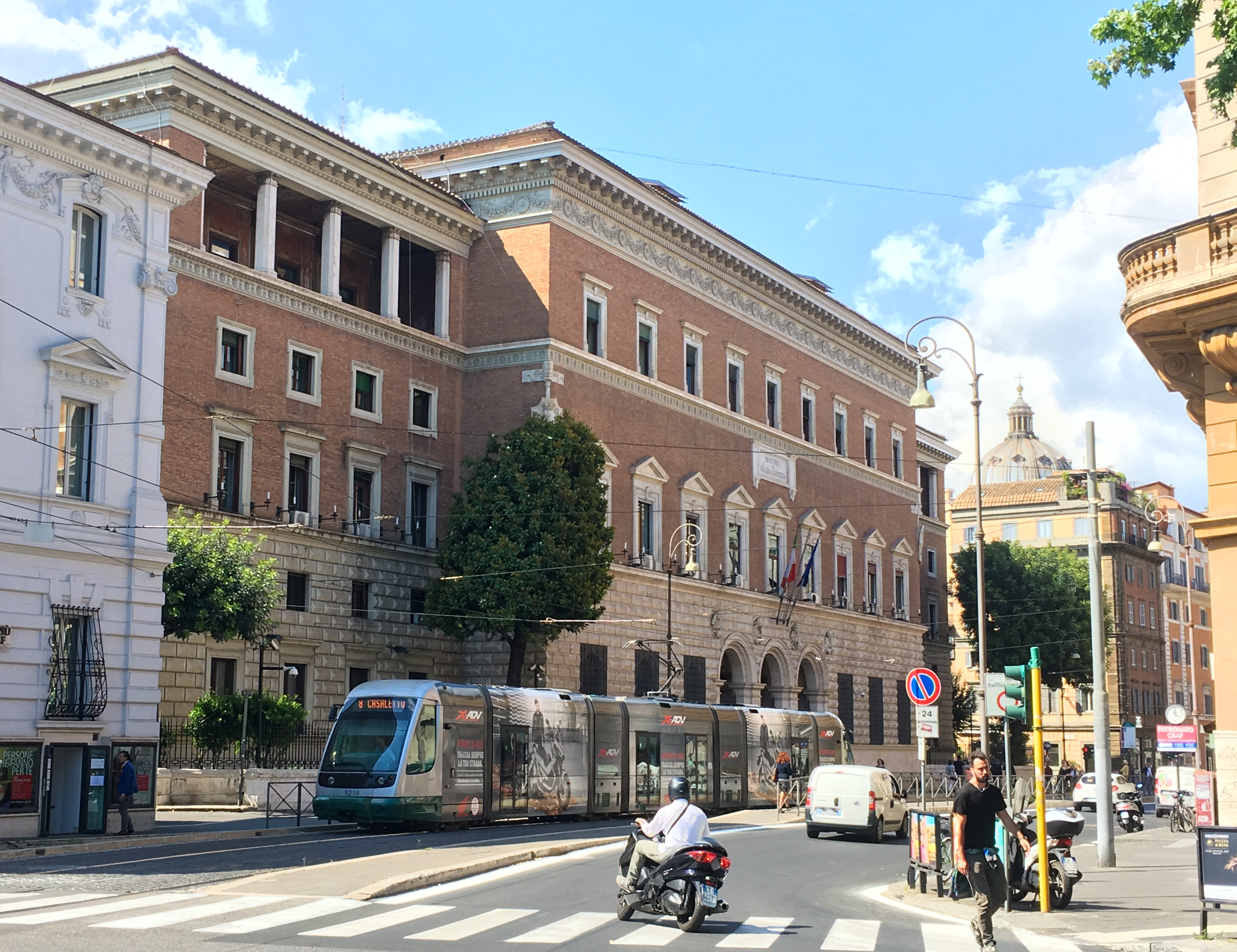
Headquarters of the Ministry of Justice on Via Arenula, Rome

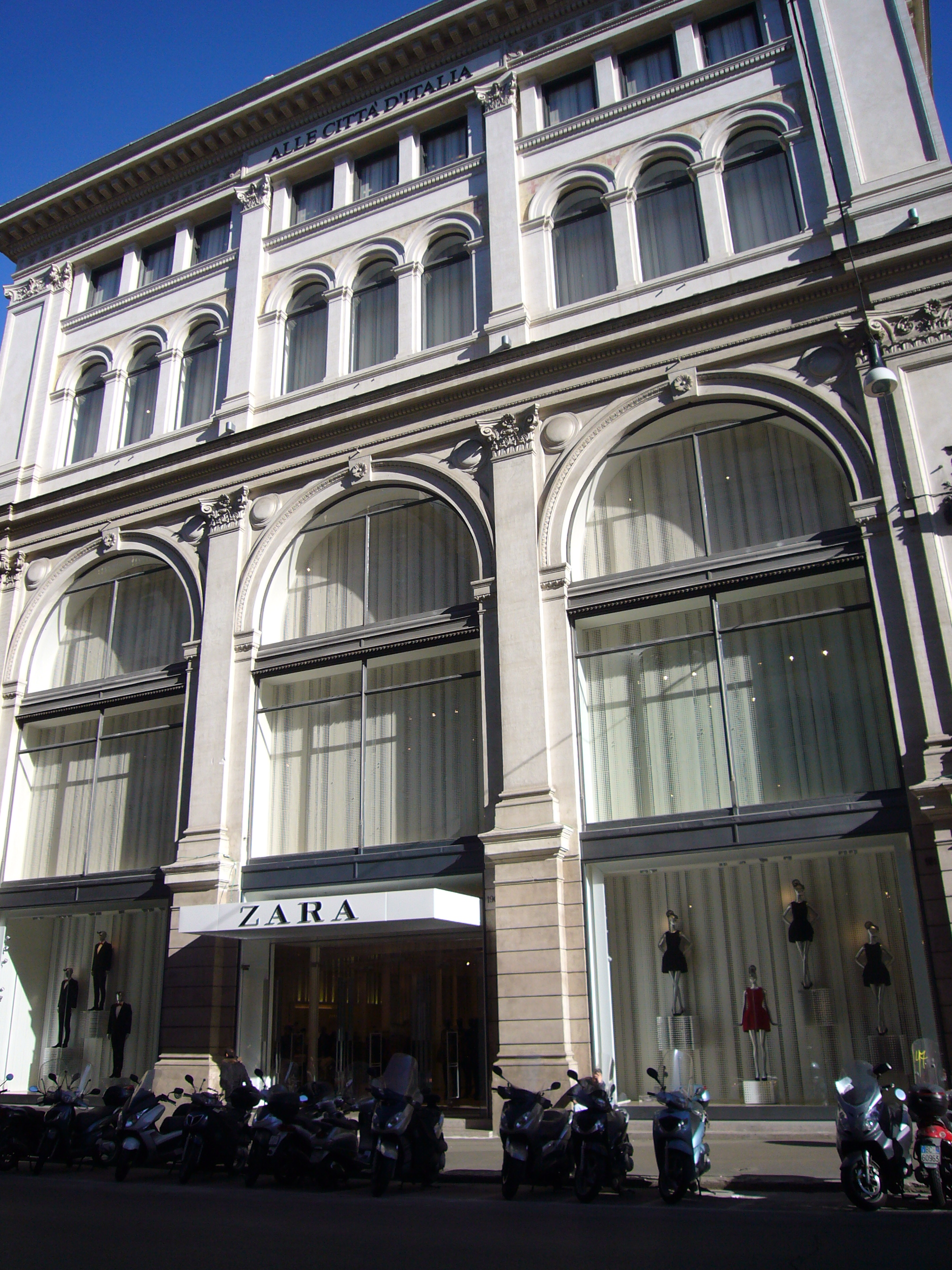
Palazzo della Rinascente

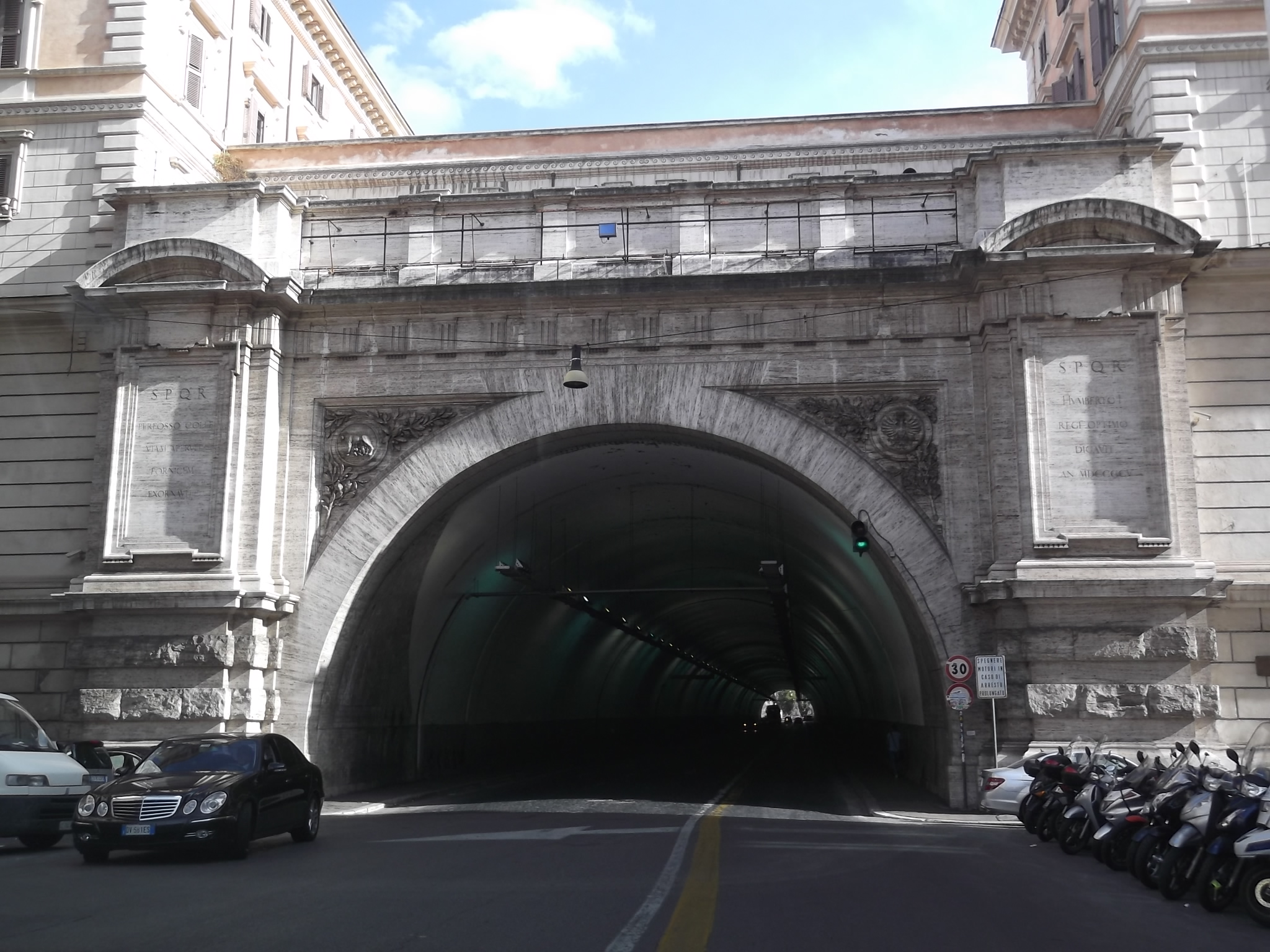
Traforo Umberto I, Rome
