= Mengarini =

Mengarini may refer to:

- Gregorio Mengarini (1811–1886), Italian Jesuit priest and missionary and linguist
- Guglielmo Mengarini (1856–1927), Italian engineer and politician
- Mengarini's Opening, a chess opening devised by American chess master Ariel Mengarini which is a variation of the Sicilian Defence
- Palazzo Mengarini, a 19th-century palazzo in Rome
