= Via Nazionale =

Via Nazionale is a street name in several Italian towns and cities, including:

- Cortona
- Policastro Bussentino
- Rome
- Trieste
