= Gaetano Koch =

Italian architect

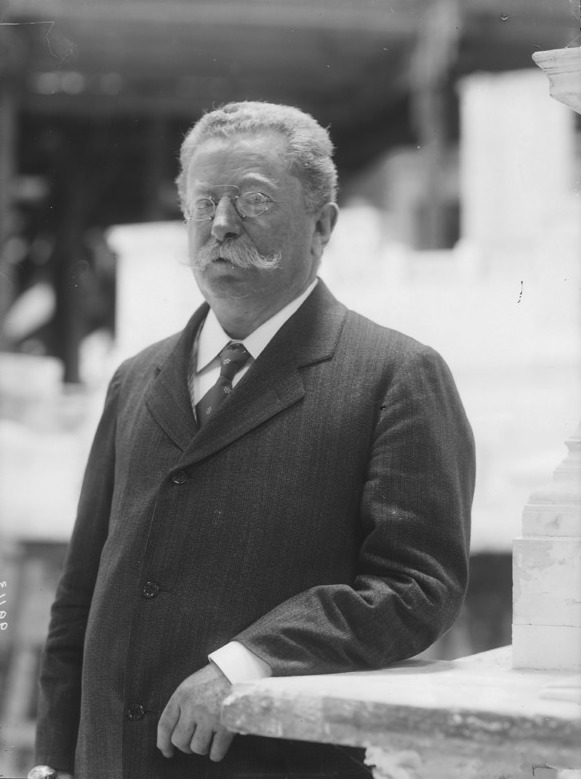
- Gaetano Koch
- Born: 9 January 1849; Rome, Papal States
- Died: 14 May 1910 (aged 61); Rome, Kingdom of Italy
- Occupation: Architect
- Movement: Renaissance Revival architecture
- Buildings: Palazzo Koch; Piazza della Repubblica; Piazza Vittorio; Palazzo Mengarini; Palazzo Margherita

Gaetano Koch (9 January 1849 – 14 May 1910) was an Italian architect, grandson of Joseph Anton Koch. He was among several architects to respond to the new opportunities created after the unification of Italy in the new capital of Rome.

== Biography ==
Koch was born in Rome on 9 January 1849. He studied Engineering and Architecture at Sapienza University of Rome, where he took his degree in 1872. Koch entered the profession at the age of 23, working in the technical department of the Società dell’Esquilina in the neo-Cinquecento tradition followed in Roman circles by Pietro Camporese the Elder and by Cosimo Morelli. Koch’s debut for this firm, in 1882, was the large group of buildings in the middle of Piazza Vittorio Emanuele II in Rome. He was subsequently invited, together with Pio Piacentini and Francesco Azzuri, to take part in the competition (1882) for the headquarters of the Banca Nazionale (now Bank of Italy) on Via Nazionale. After an attempt by the prestigious state body to find a compromise between the designs of Koch and those of Piacentini, in 1885 the outcome of this competition, initially judged by Camillo Boito alone, was victory for Koch’s solution (completed 1892).

The Banca Nazionale has two large courtyards within high elevations, which are divided horizontally into its three storeys. The main façade has two entrance pavilions, one to each court, at either end of the emphasized central thirteen bays. Built with all the latest technology, the project established Koch as a designer of authority and prestige – a reputation that continued throughout his working life. Monumental yet without the pomposity of the Palace of Justice by Guglielmo Calderini or the Victor Emanuel monument by Giuseppe Sacconi, the Banca Nazionale is proof of the flexibility of the Roman palazzo type of building, though extended well beyond its normal scale.

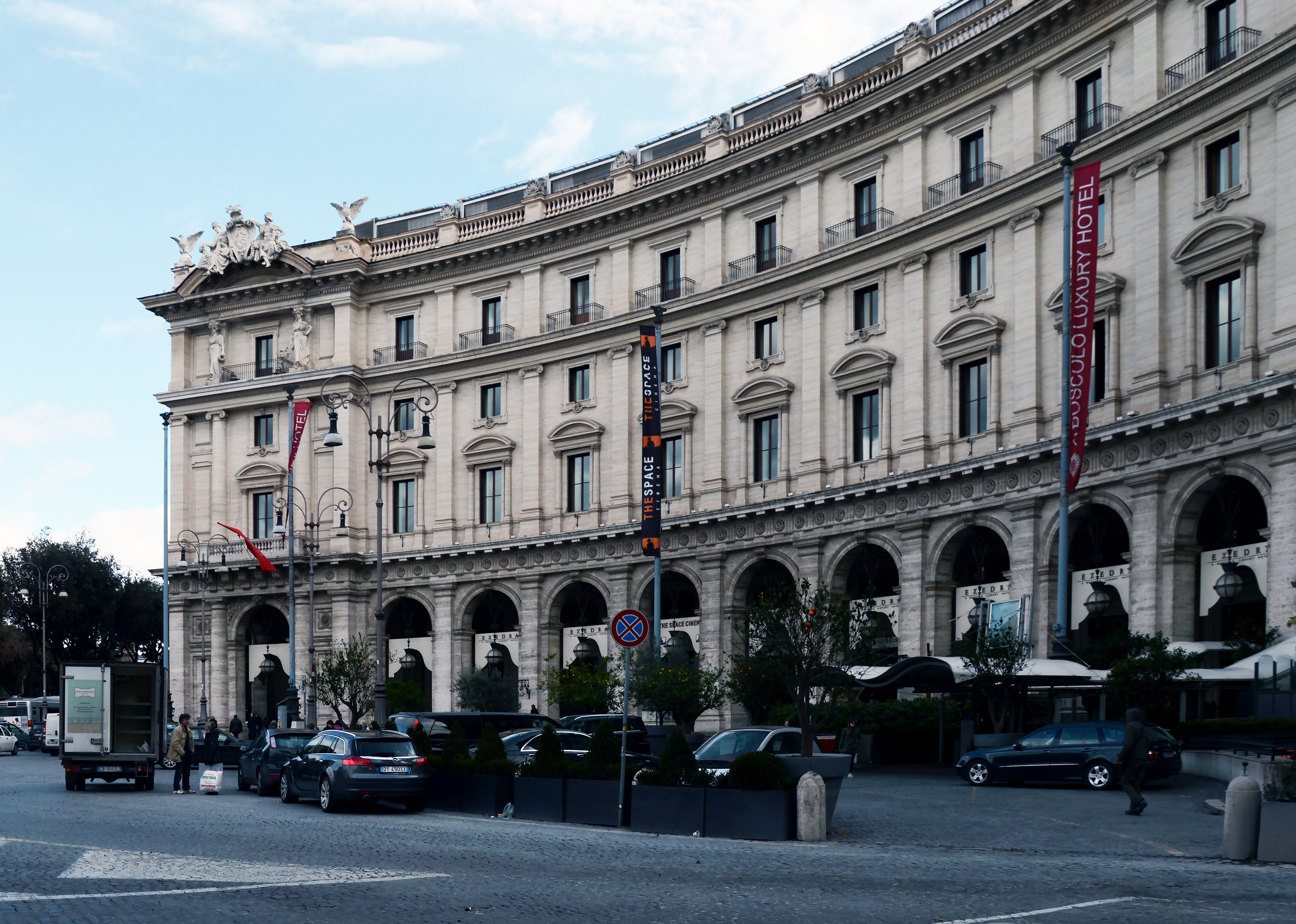
Piazza della Repubblica, Rome

Koch attained similar if more dramatic results with the successful layout of Piazza delle Terme (now Piazza della Repubblica) and the design of two buildings (built between 1886 and 1890), the Palazzi dell’Esedra, at the head of the Via Nazionale. The semicircular perimeter of the two monumental yet lively buildings follows the outline of the grandiose exedra of the Baths of Diocletian and at the same time forms a monumental approach to the railway station. Brilliantly solving the problems linked to the divided ownership of the area, Koch managed to fuse the speculative and the symbolic with a solution rooted in a very specific urban context. In particular, the design of the spacious round-arched arcades to the ground-floor contributes to the effect of a single organic solution, adding emphasis and definition to the volumes without making any facile concessions to a spurious decorativeness. Koch also used a simple Ionic pilaster to give a sense of rhythm to the closely set window openings required by the residential use of the buildings, at the same time producing a frame appropriate to the partly public nature of the building and to its key location.

Koch applied a consistent architectural approach across several scales, emphasizing clear volumes. Notable works include the Palazzo Margherita (1887–91), now the American Embassy on Via Veneto, which features a T-plan and a 15-bay entrance façade in the Cinquecento style. Other designs include the Palazzo Calabresi on Via XX Settembre and the Palazzo Buoncompagni on Largo Goldoni, characterized by a combined ground-floor and mezzanine unit with diminishing upper storeys.

Gaetano Koch's work has been described as combining decorative elements with functional requirements, typological research, and efficient building practices. During his career, he designed buildings that shaped the architectural character of several important spaces in Rome. His talents attracted the attention of a broad base of clientele, particularly among the Roman bourgeoisie and aristocracy including Prince Ugo Boncompagni Ludovisi Piombino, the Marchese De Parente, and the senators Giacomo Balestra and Giovanni Barracco.

He established a flexible but consistent style, inspired by the tradition of the Sangallo family and the Tuscan Renaissance, in response to the demands for a new national style that reflected Italian history. In Rome this was expressed in state architecture and in the new living pattern of the multi-storey house. The Cinquecento palazzo, symbol of power and decorum, seemed to offer the flexibility required by the planning of the new city, by the needs of the new urban building lot and by the new linking arteries. Koch was pragmatic and used a tested repertoire, concentrating on solving distributive and functional problems and setting aside all experimentalism and stylistic individuality.

== Select works ==
- Palazzo Koch, Rome
- Piazza della Repubblica, Rome
- Palazzi dell’Esedra, Rome
- Piazza Vittorio Emanuele II, Rome
- Palazzo Mengarini, Rome
- Palazzo Margherita, Rome
- Palazzo Calabresi, Rome
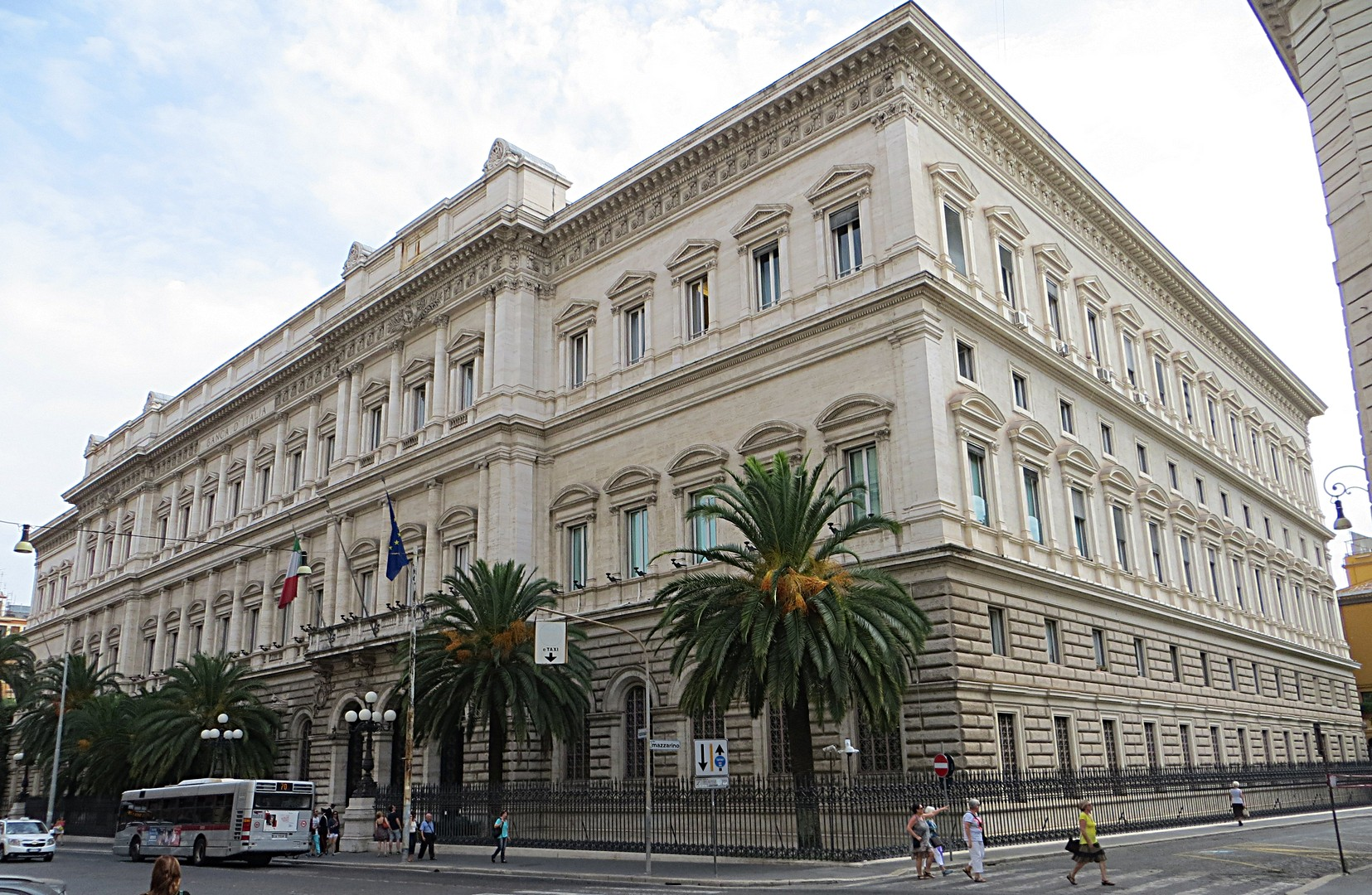
Palazzo Koch, Rome

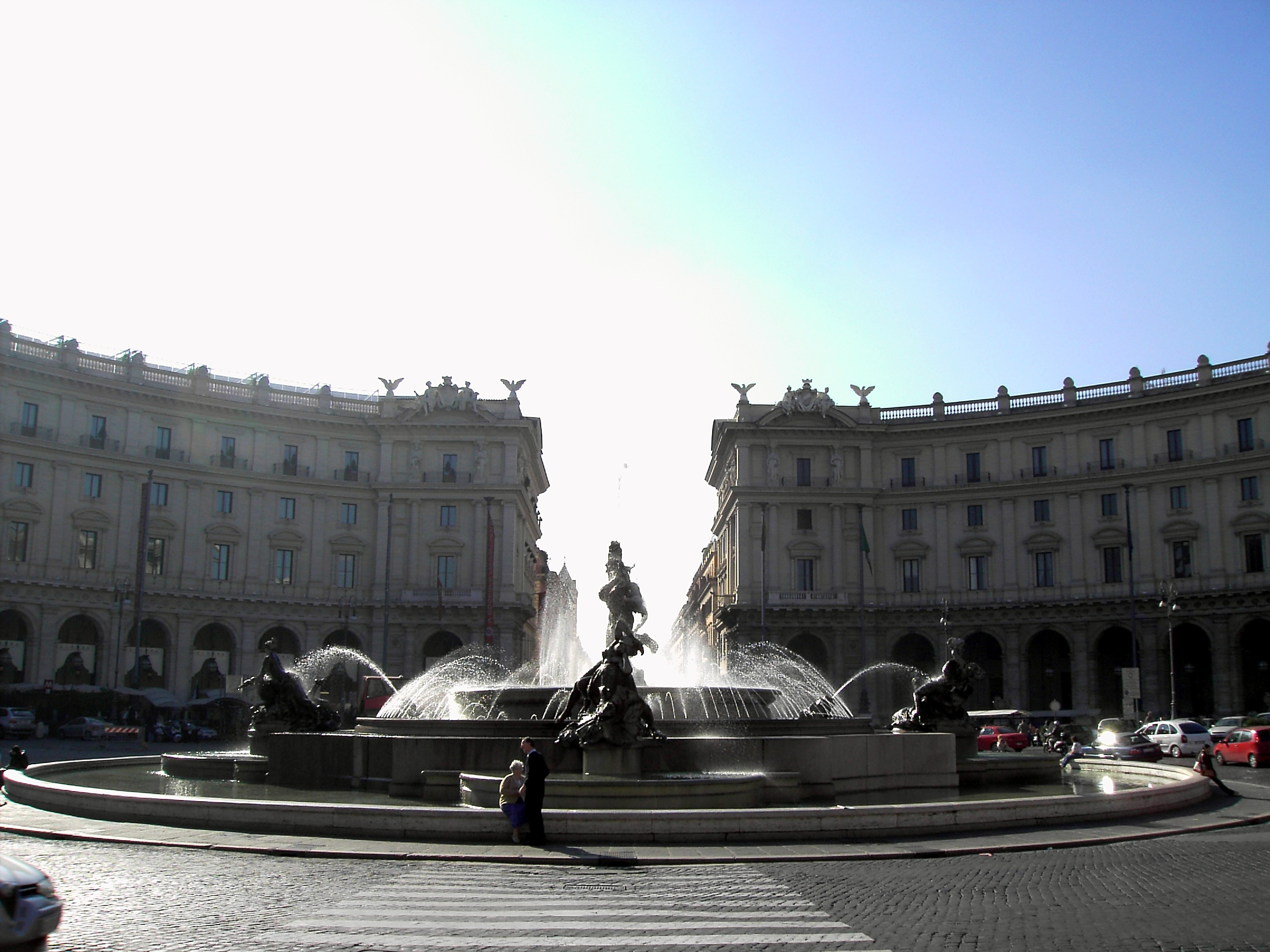
Palazzi dell’Esedra, Rome

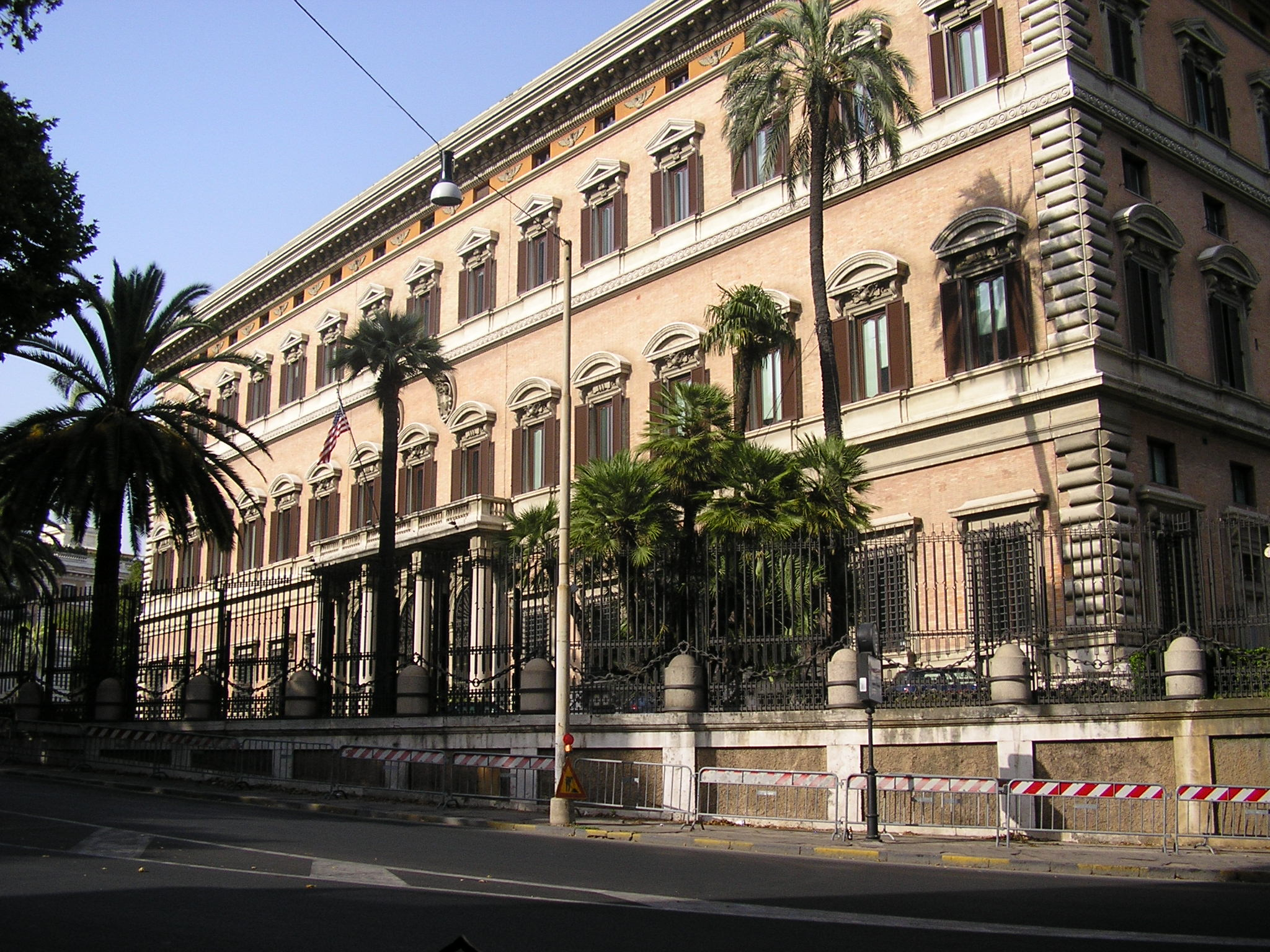
Palazzo Margherita, Rome

== Sources ==
- Di Marco, Fabrizio (2004). "KOCH, Gaetano". Dizionario Biografico degli Italiani (in Italian). Vol. 62: Iacobiti–Labriola. Rome: Istituto dell'Enciclopedia Italiana. ISBN 978-88-12-00032-6.
- Loretta Mozzoni; Stefano Santini, eds. (2004). Il disegno e le architetture della città eclettica. Naples: Liguori Editore. ISBN 8820736535.
