= Galleria Umberto I =

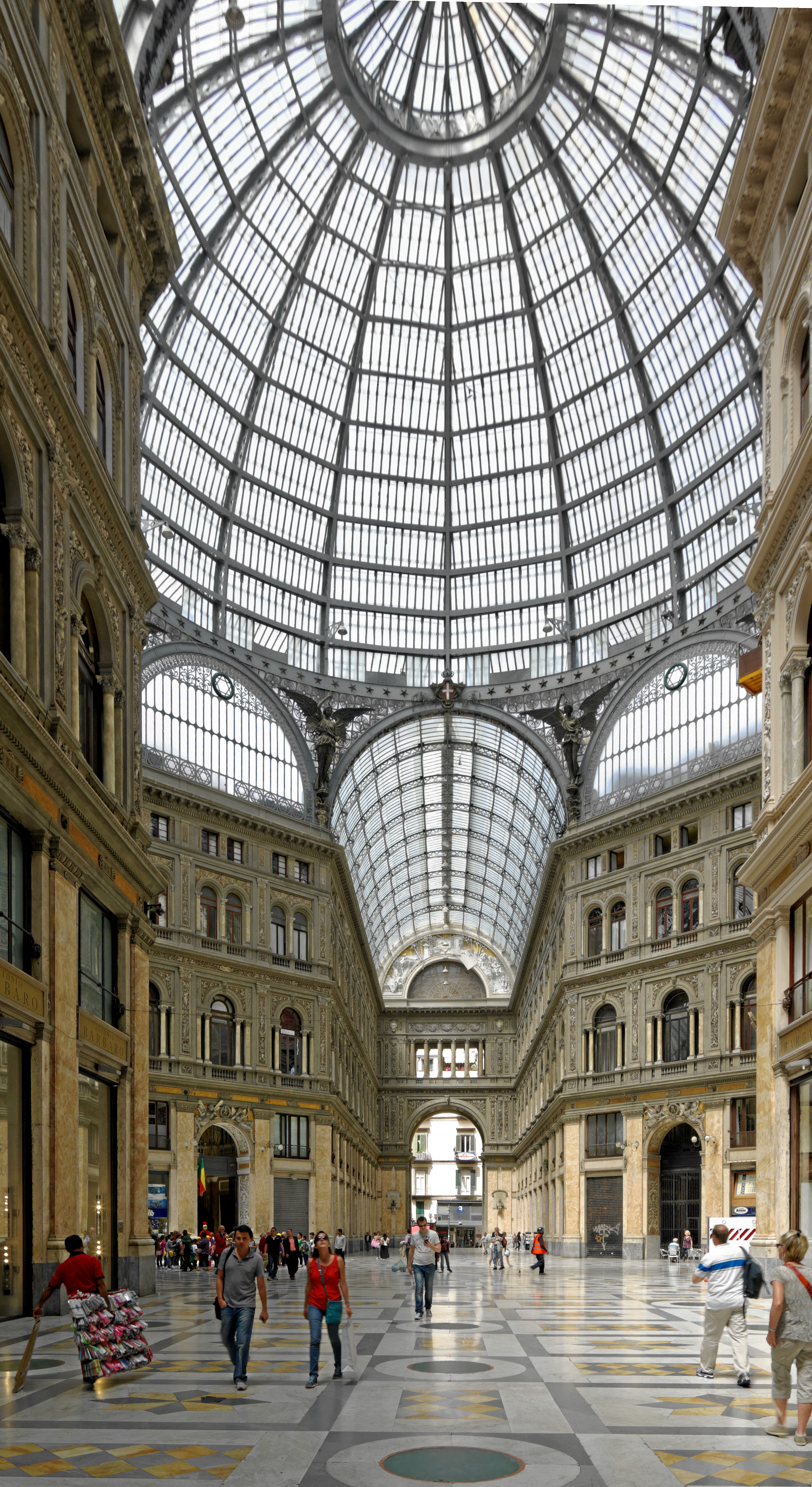
- Location: Naples, Italy
- Coordinates: 40°50′19.06″N 14°14′58.45″E
- Opened: 1890
- Architect: Emanuele Rocco
- Floors: 5

Galleria Umberto I is a public shopping gallery in Naples, southern Italy. It is located directly across from the San Carlo opera house. It was built between 1887 and 1890, and was the cornerstone in the decades-long rebuilding of Naples—called the risanamento (lit. "making healthy again")—that lasted until World War I. With a dome 57m high at the tip of its spire, it was designed in the Stile Umbertino by Emanuele Rocco who employed modern architectural elements reminiscent of the Galleria Vittorio Emanuele II in Milan. The Galleria was named after Umberto I, King of Italy at the time of construction. It was meant to combine businesses, shops, cafés and social life—public space—with private space in the apartments on the third floor.

The Galleria is a high and spacious cross-shaped structure, surmounted by a glass dome braced by 16 metal ribs. Of the four iron and glass-vaulted wings, one fronts on via Toledo (via Roma), still the main downtown thoroughfare, and another opens onto the San Carlo Theatre. It has returned to being an active center of Neapolitan civic life after years of decay. The building is part of the UNESCO listing of the Historic Centre of Naples as a World Heritage Site.

The Galleria Umberto is the setting for The Gallery (1947) by the American writer John Horne Burns (1916–1953) based on his experiences as an American soldier in Naples shortly after the liberation of the city.

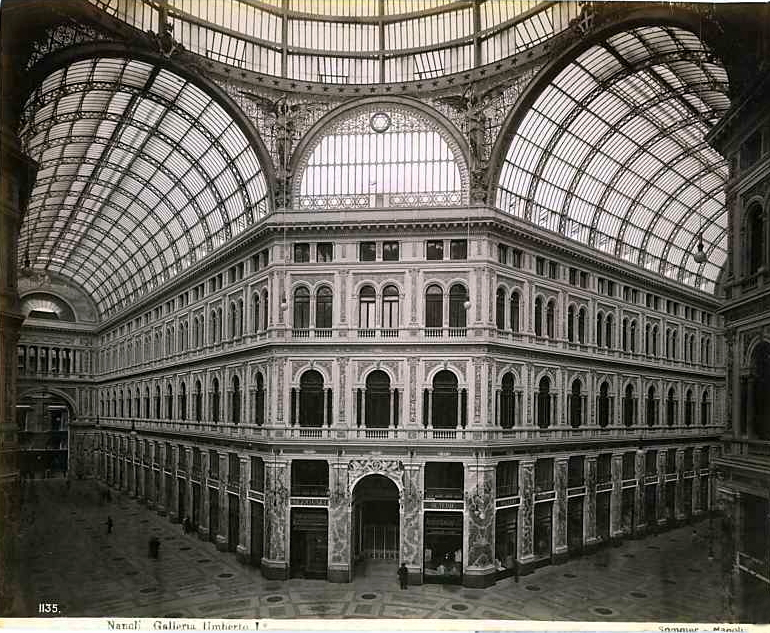
Galleria Umberto I around 1900

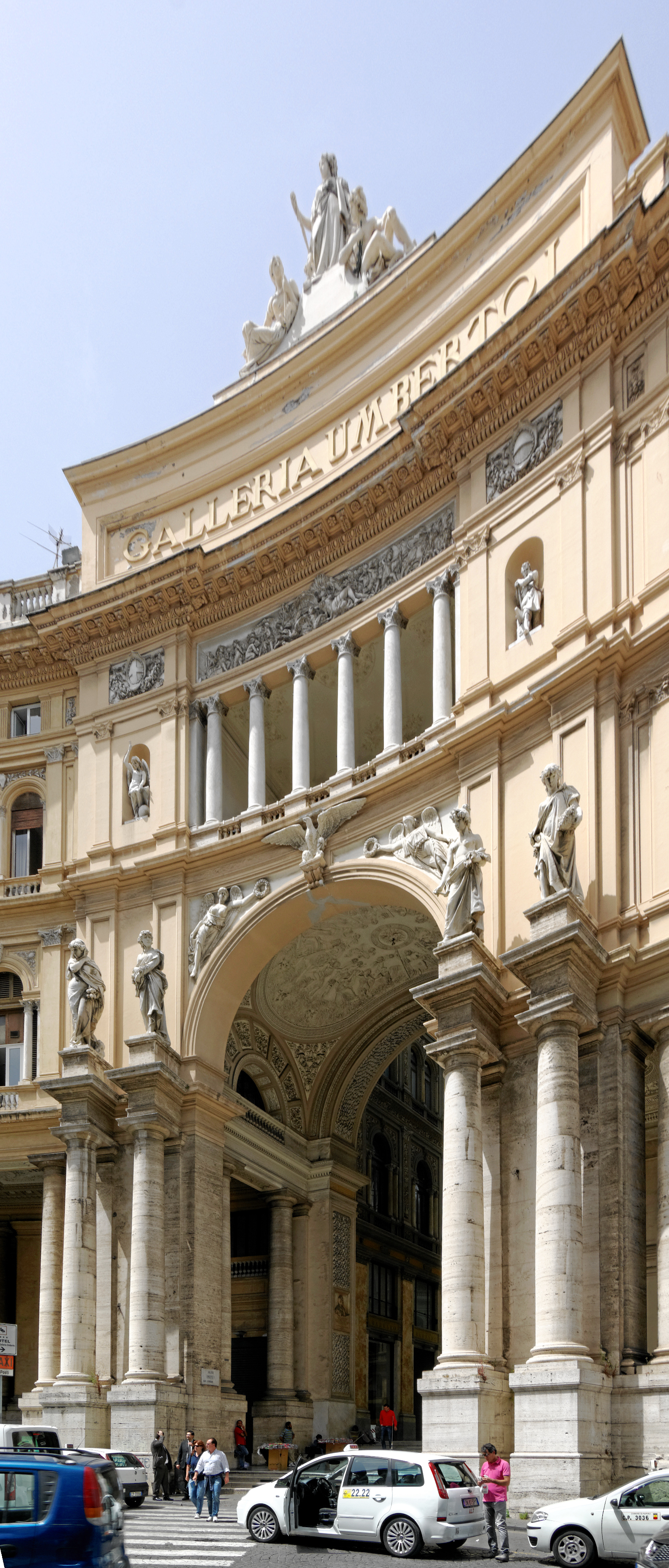
Main Entrance to the Galleria Umberto I

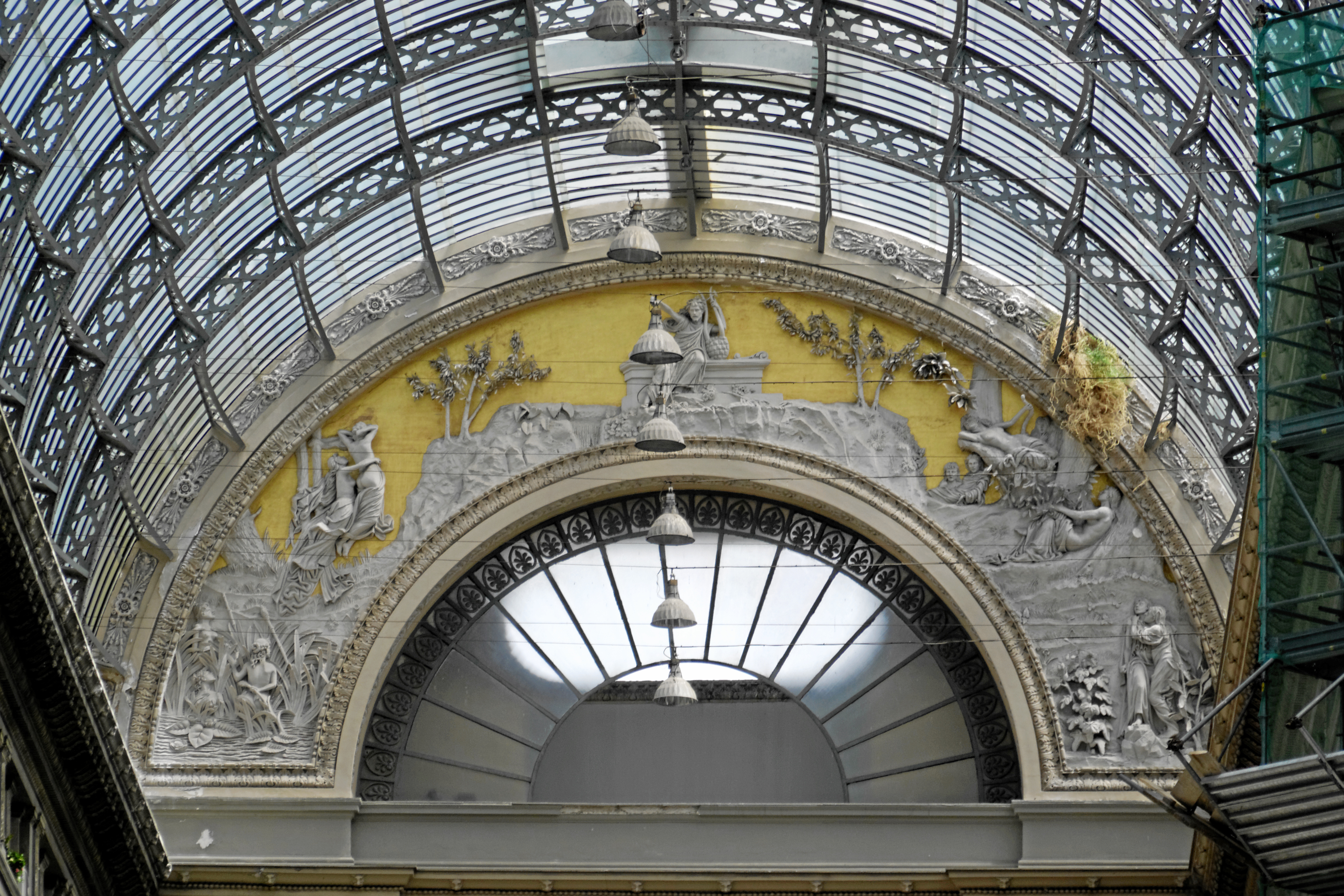
Detail of one Wing

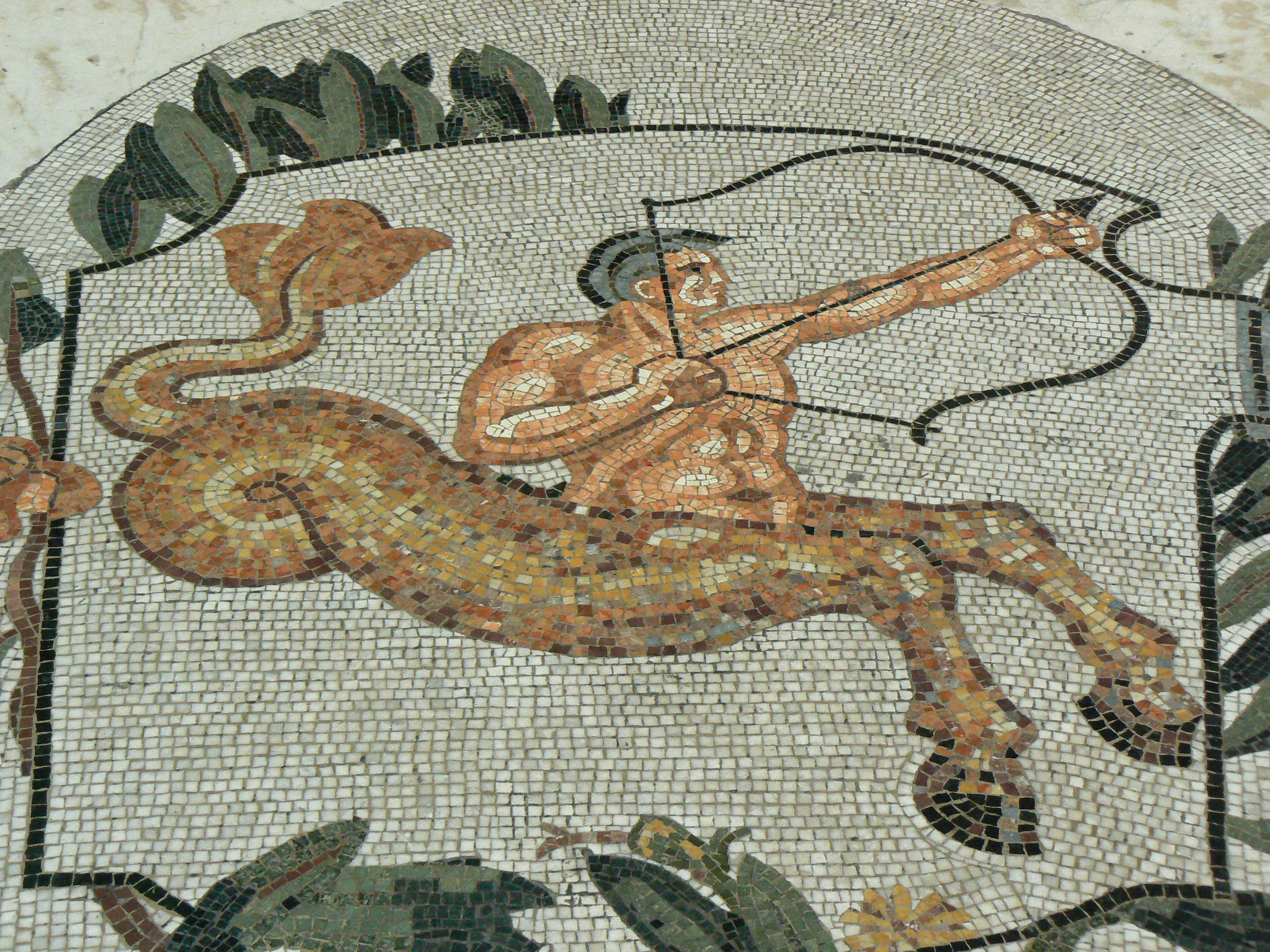
Detail of the Floor

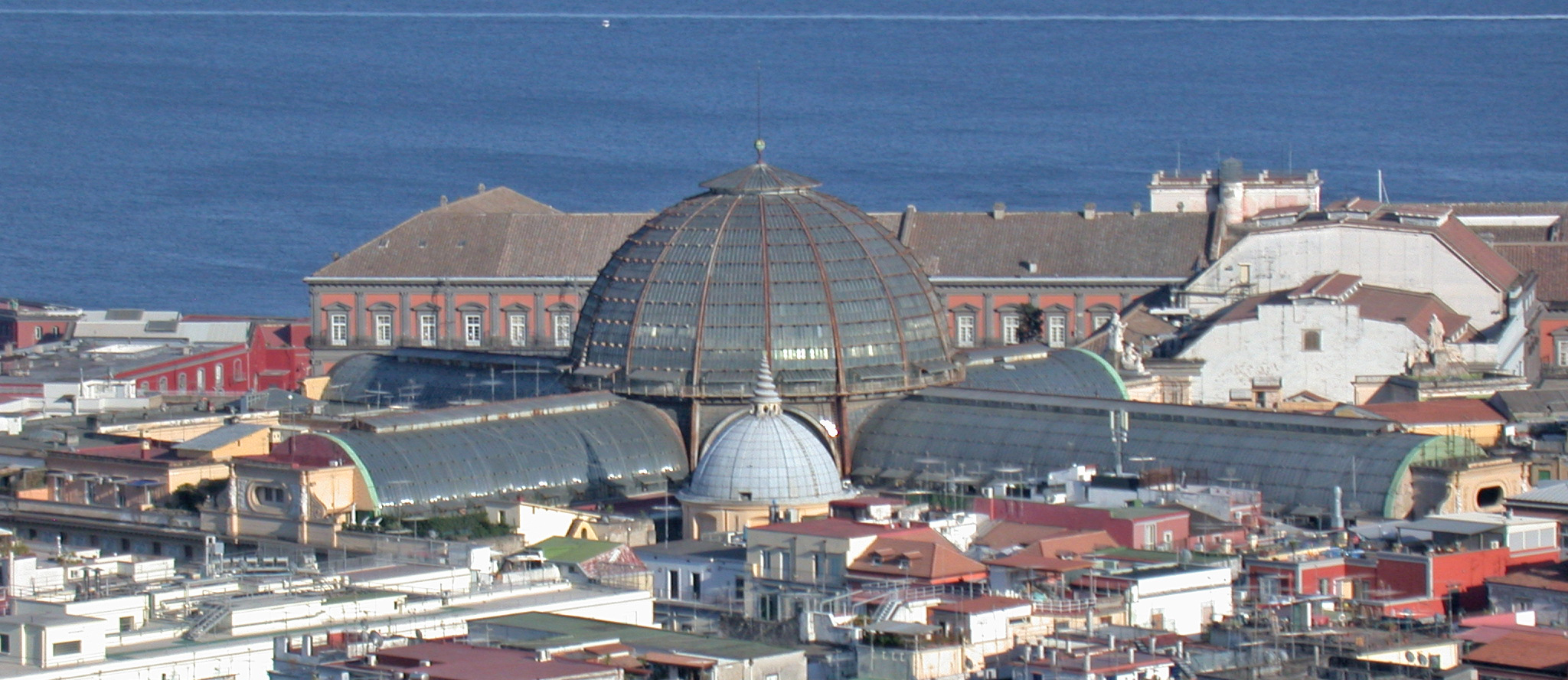
Galleria Umberto I from top

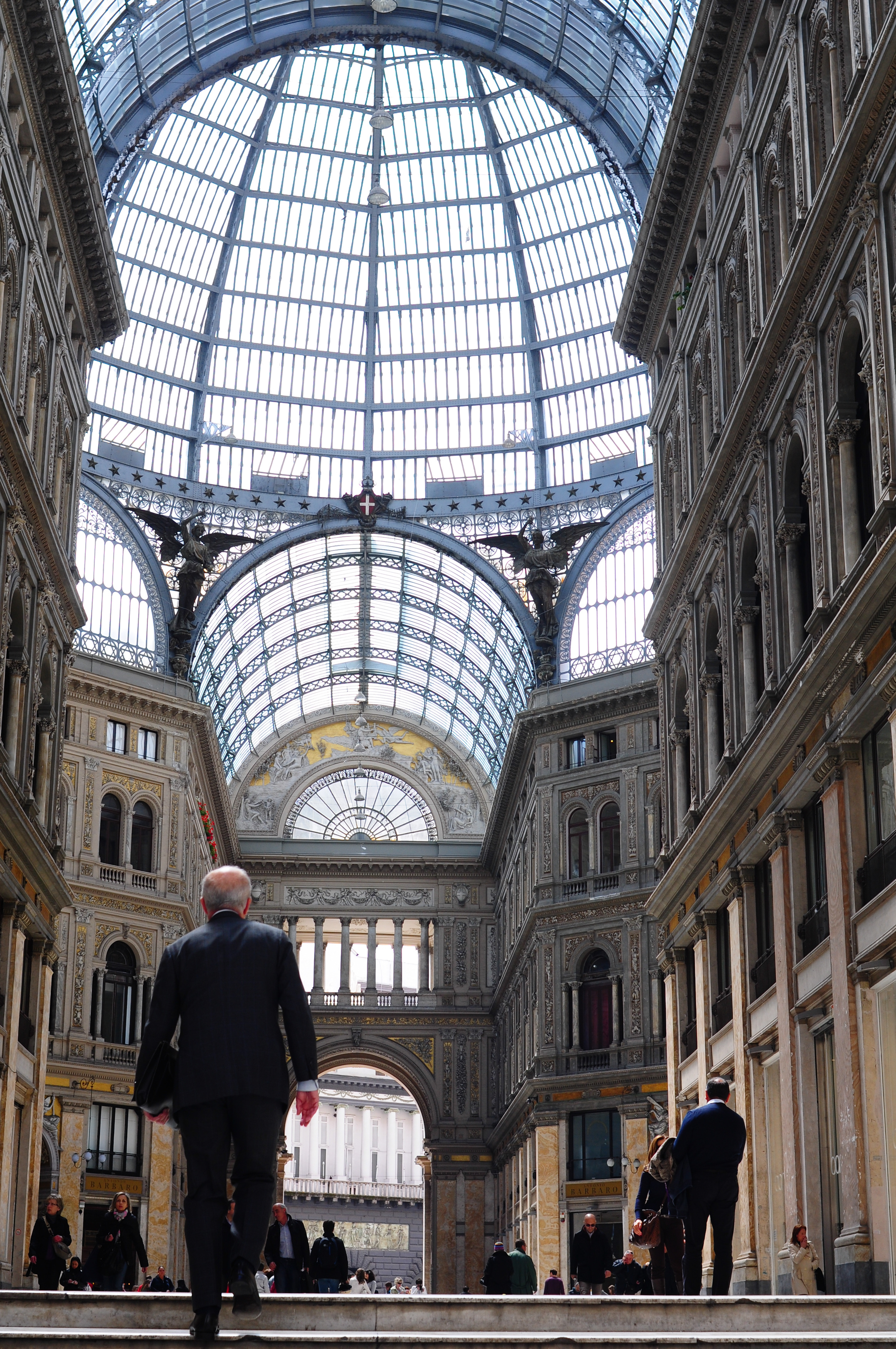
Interior of Galleria Umberto I
