= Palazzo Mengarini =

Coordinates: 41.897759°N 12.485877°E

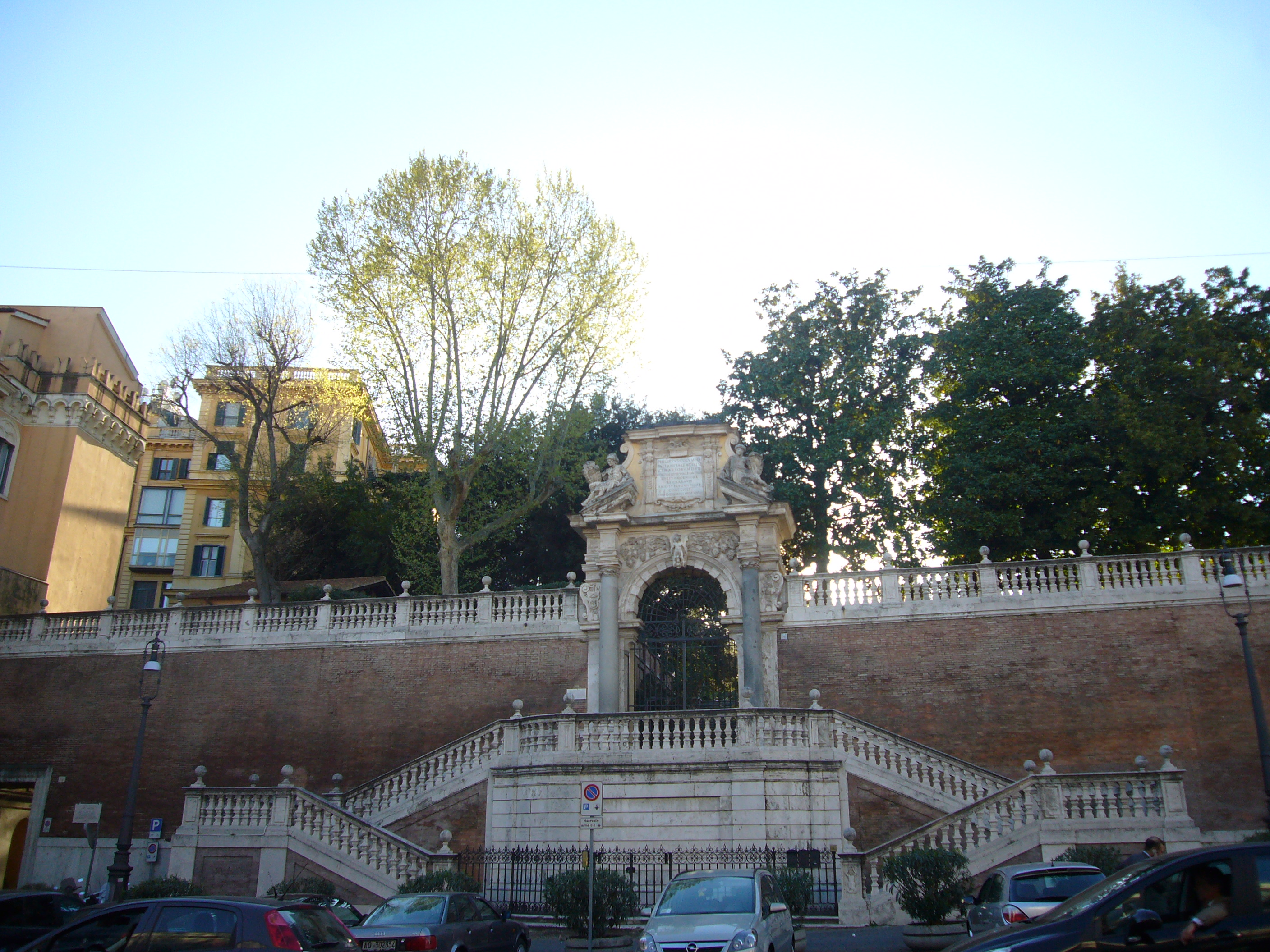
- Facade

General information
- Location: Rome, Italy

Palazzo Mengarini is a 19th-century palazzo in via XXIV maggio in Rome.

The palace is named after a 19th-century Senator during the Kingdom of Italy, Guglielmo Mengarini. The Senator commissioned the palace design from the architect Gaetano Koch. Mengarini's wife, the German chemist Margarete Traube, animated a lively salon at this palace, hosting Theodor Mommsen, Emanuel Löwy, Pietro Blaserna, Adolf Furtwängler, as well as her brother Ludwig Traube. It subsequently became property of Senator Luigi Albertini, director of Corriere della Sera, and after 1941, of his daughter Elena née Carandini.
