= Palazzo Koch =

Building in Rome, Italy

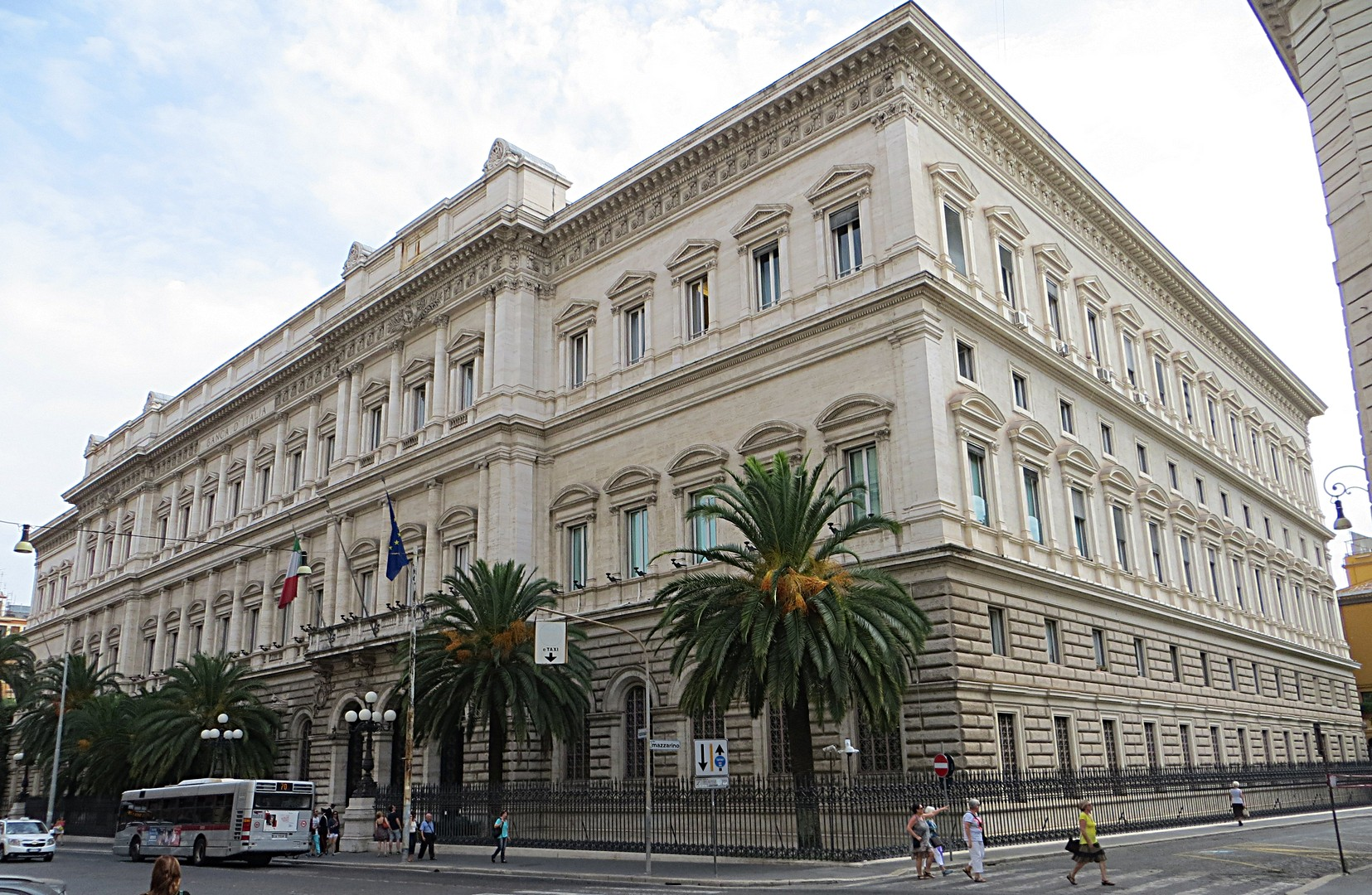
- Palazzo Koch
- Click on the map to see marker

General information
- Architectural style: Renaissance Revival
- Location: Via Nazionale 91, Rome, Italy
- Coordinates: 41°53′51″N 12°29′20″E
- Groundbreaking: 1888
- Estimated completion: 1892
- Owner: Banca d'Italia

Design and construction
- Architect: Gaetano Koch

Palazzo Koch is a Renaissance Revival palace on Via Nazionale in Rome, Italy. Initially commissioned by the National Bank of the Kingdom of Italy and built in 1888-1892, it is the current head office of its successor entity the Bank of Italy. It is named after its designer, the architect Gaetano Koch.

== Description ==
The building measures 109 meters by 60 meters and rises up to 37 meters in height. The main façade is made of travertine marble and has features of the Doric, Ionic and Corinthian orders. Of the five floors, two are below ground. These still have windows from a moat (8 meters wide, 5 meters deep) that surrounds three sides of the building. There are two symmetrical main entrances on Via Nazionale, but only one of them is presently in use.

With later additions, also used by the central bank, Palazzo Koch occupies an entire city block. It currently houses representative rooms used by the Banca d'Italia for official events, the top management, central administration, the Paolo Baffi Library and the Money Museum.

The building is laid out around two interior courtyards. The Court of Honour (the western of the two courtyards) also features the three classical orders on its facades. A niche contains a bust of the building's architect. An archway towards the adjacent building which formerly housed the banknote printing facility faces a fountain topped by a statue of Antinous made during the reign of Hadrian.

The wing between the two courtyards contains the Sala della Lupa, with a copy of the Capitoline Wolf, which gives access to the main stairway, the Scalone D'Onore. This more than 3-meter-wide stairway extends up to the top floor without any central supports. At its foot are two 3rd-century sarcophagi.

The first piano nobile (first upper floor) features chandeliers made from Murano glass, marble flooring and doorways and silk tapestries on the wall. The public rooms also house numerous works of art, from statues, European paintings (16th-19th centuries) as well as Oriental pieces such as Chinese lions (Han and Wei dynasties), Cambodian Buddha heads and Indian and Persian artifacts.

Located in the center of the façade towards Via Nazionale is the Salone dei Partecipanti (shareholders' room). This hall, over 300 square-meters in size, is the scene of the meeting of the Banca d'Italia's shareholders and of the Governor's speech, each year in late May.
