= Via Nazionale (Rome) =

Street in Rome, Italy

Coordinates: 41°53′59″N 12°29′30″E

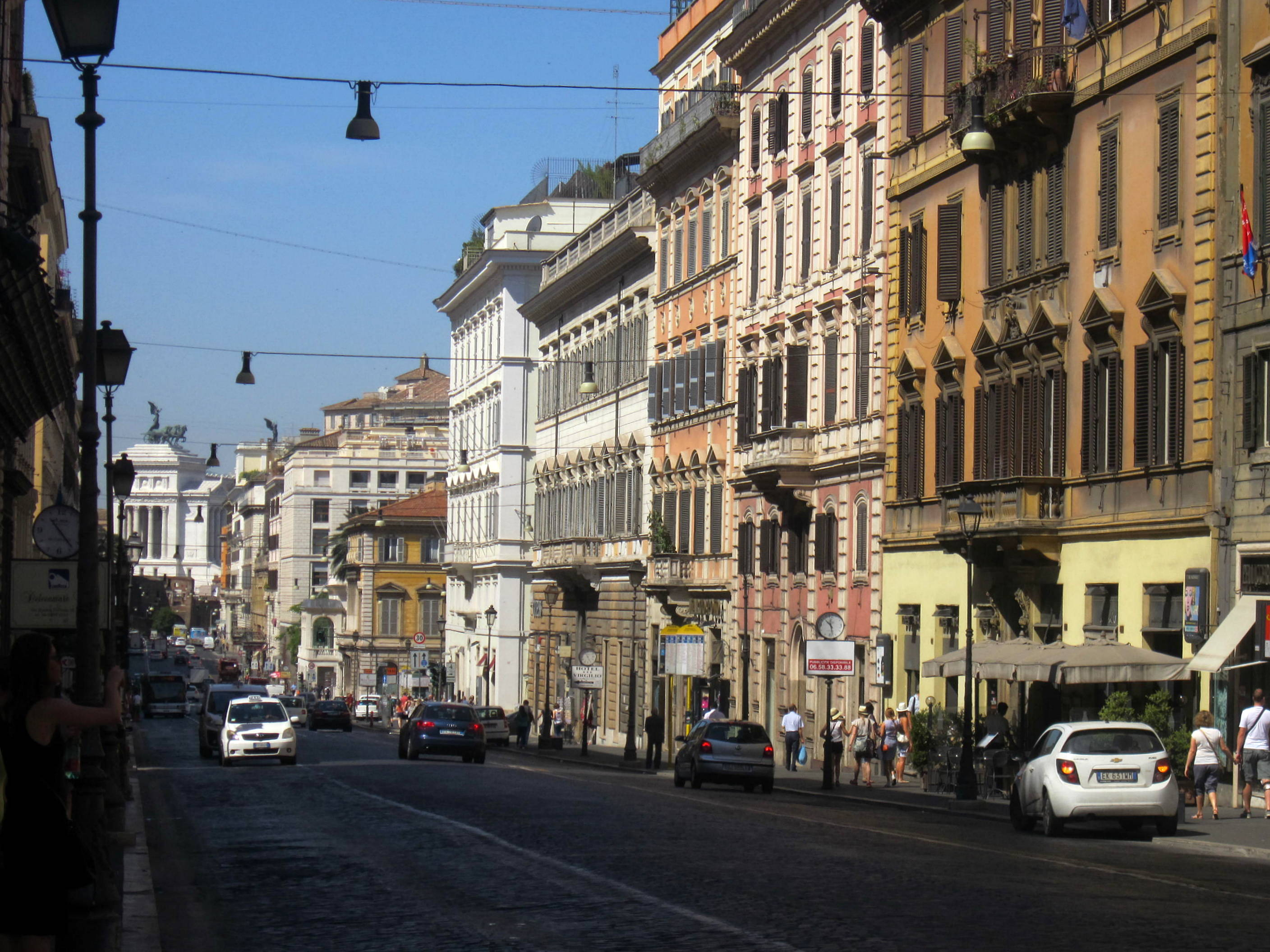
Via Nazionale

Via Nazionale is a street in Rome from Piazza della Repubblica leading towards Piazza Venezia.

Already begun as via Pia, named in honour of Pius IX, who had wanted to connect Stazione Termini to the city-centre, the street was completed at the end of the 19th century through the ambition of several figures of the Risorgimento to create a "new Rome" as a capital of the unified Kingdom of Italy.

The enlargement of this artery was necessary to create a link between Rome's central station and the most populous part of the city, and the new road was extended to the east bank of the river Tiber by the Corso Vittorio Emanuele II. However, the construction works ripped the heart out of the city by demolishing buildings in its path (including palazzi such as the National Dramatic Theatre), which substantially modified the previous street's route. On it are to be found:

- Palazzo delle Esposizioni (1883)
- Palazzo Koch - site of the Banca d'Italia (1892)
- The 17th-century Roman Villa Aldobrandini, whose gardens were truncated by the construction of Via Nazionale in the 19th century.
- Largo Angelicum off of which is found the Pontifical University of Saint Thomas Aquinas, Angelicum
- Santa Caterina a Magnanapoli
- St Paul's Within the Walls (1880)
