= Porta Caelimontana and Porta Querquetulana =

Two city gates

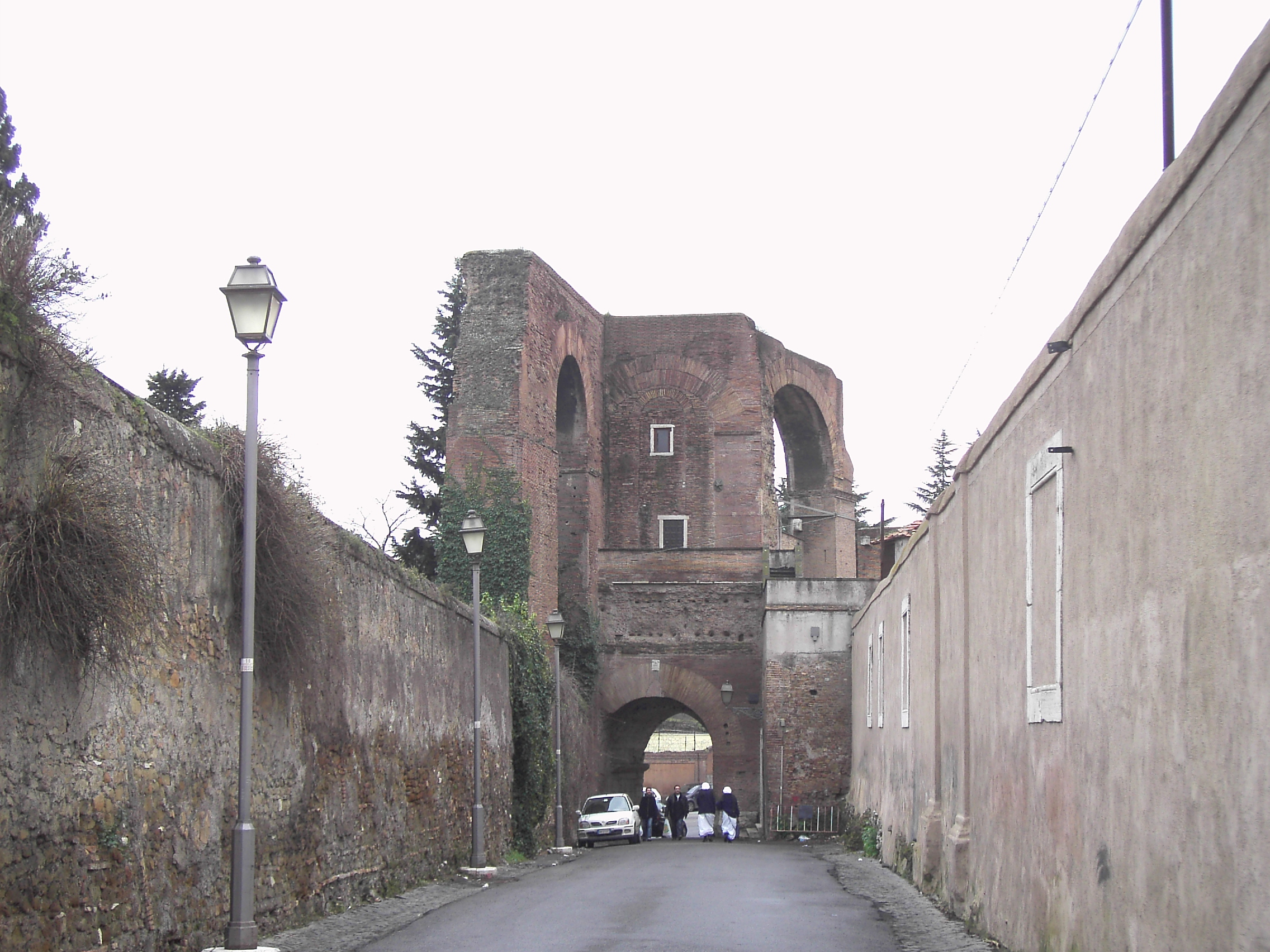
- Via San Paolo della Crose and the Arch of Dolabella and Silanus (former Porta Caelimontana).
- Interactive map of Porta Caelimontana and Porta Querquetulana
- 41°53′08.0″N 12°29′43.0″E
- Location: Rome (Italy), Via di San Paolo della Croce
- Part of: Historic district of Rome

Site notes
- Management: Sovrintendenza capitolina ai beni culturali

Porta Caelimontana and Porta Querquetulana were two city gates that opened in the Servian Wall in Rome (Italy); only the first one is still existing.

== History ==
The two gates opened on the eastern side of the Caelian Hill. Only in recent times (although some doubts still persist), it has finally been established that Porta Caelimontana was the westernmost one, while Porta Querquetulana was located further east.

Until a few years ago the arguments of some scholars tended to support the exact opposite, on the basis of both toponymic and archaeological evaluations. In the absence of clear indications from the classical sources (whose quotations in this regard are almost non-existent), the hypothesis was based on the assumption that both gates derived their name from that of the hill on which they were located. Querquetulum (meaning "covered with oak woods" in Latin) was in fact the ancient name of what was only later called Caelius: it could therefore be assumed that the two gates could have been opened in succession: the Querquetulana first and then - maybe in an expansion of the Servian walls, when the oaks were no longer there - the Caelimontana.

The only surviving remains belong to the westernmost gate, still existing, which was transformed into what is currently known as the Arch of Dolabella and Silanus, and consist of blocks dating back to the beginning of the fourth century BC, when the first republican walls were built: it can be therefore deduced that this should have been Porta Querquetulana. An indirect (although a bit weak) confirmation of such conclusion is provided by Livy, who mentions Porta Caelimontana for the first time (XXXV, 9) to report a lightning that struck it in 193 BC.

Despite some residual doubts, the hypothesis that places Porta Querquetulana to the east - within the perimeter of the current San Giovanni Hospital, close to the intersection between Via dei Santi Quattro and Via di Santo Stefano Rotondo - and Porta Caelimontana further west - at the beginning of Via San Paolo della Croce, on the route of the former Clivus Scauri - is currently more accredited.

This turnaround about the real location of the two gates is not due to an argument that's considered no longer valid, but to an incorrect chronological evaluation, according to which the fourth-century wall was thought the oldest one on the hill. In fact Porta Querquetulana, as well as Porta Viminalis, Porta Esquilina and Porta Collina, actually dates back to a very ancient period, about two centuries before the construction of the Servian wall: the four original gates can be traced back to the enlargement of Rome by king Servius Tullius, which included in the territory of the city three of the historical "seven hills", the Quirinal, the Viminal, the Esquiline and the Querquetulan. The first defensive bulwark that connected the gates to each other - that is, the 1,300 metres (4,300 ft) long agger between Porta Collina and Porta Esquilina - also dates back to the same period.

According to scholars, another hint of the antiquity of these gates, confirming the above hypothesis, is also provided by their name, which derives directly from that of the hill to which they gave access, rather than from some monumental features (temples, altars, etc.) in the area, as one would expect if the gates were subsequent to the incorporation of the area itself into the urban perimeter. Therefore, it does not seem plausible that Porta Querquetulana and Porta Caelimontana are contemporary.

=== The arch of Dolabella and Silanus ===
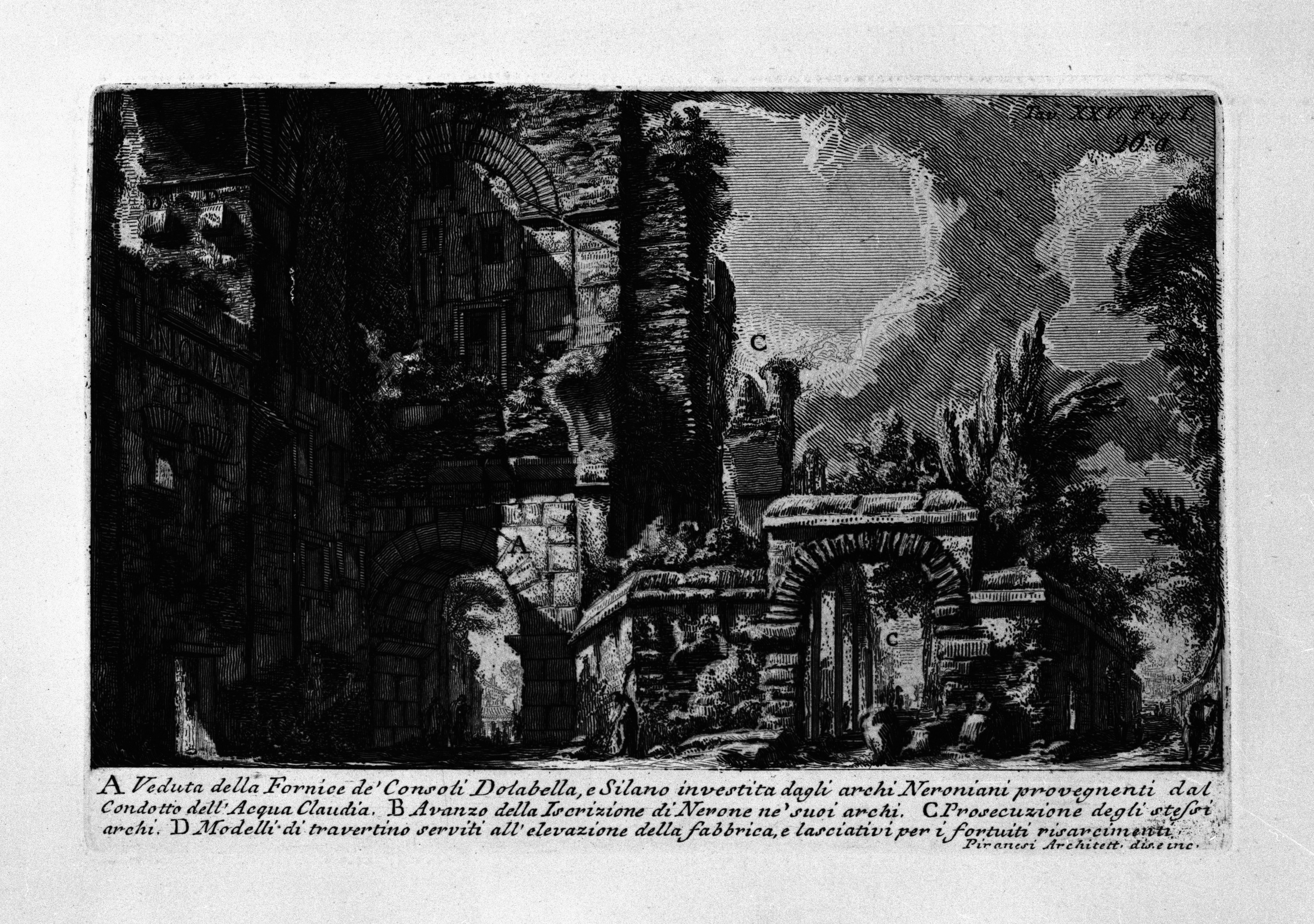
Giovanni Battista Piranesi, View of the Fornix of the Consuls Dolabella and Silanus, from Roman Antiquities of the Time of the First Republic and the First Emperors (1756).

While it is virtually impossible to provide any other information about Porta Querquetulana, due to the lack of both literary and archaeological finds, it is known that Porta Caelimontana was restored, like many other gates of the Servian wall, in the Augustan age. The present travertine arch replaced in AD 10 the old gate built with tuff blocks, still partially visible on the right, as a result of a restoration (or a reconstruction) carried out by senatorial decree at the behest of the consuls in office, as can be read on the plaque affixed to the attic of the external facade of the arch:

P CORNELIVS P F DOLABELLA
C IVNIVS C F SILANVS FLAMEN MARTIAL[IS]
CO[N]S[ULES]
EX S[ENATVS] C[ONSULTO]
FACIVNDVM CVRAVERVNT IDEMQVE PROBAVER[VNT]

Translation:

Publius Cornelius Dolabella, son of Publius,
and Gaius Junius Silanus, son of Gaius, flamen of Mars,
consuls,
by decree of the Senate
contracted out [this work] and had it tested.

Following a subsequent restoration in 211, during the reign of Caracalla, the gate was used to support the large arches, still visible today, of the Neronian aqueduct, a secondary branch of the Aqua Claudia.

The arch is surmounted by a window, behind which there is a small room, open to the public, in which tradition says that St. John of Matha, the founder of the Trinitarian Order, lived from 1209 until his death in 1213; the church of San Tommaso in Formis, next to the arch, still belongs to the Order.

== Bibliography ==
- Laura G.Cozzi: Le porte di Roma. F. Spinosi Ed., Rome, 1968
- Filippo Coarelli: Guida archeologica di Roma. A. Mondadori Ed., 1984
- Giuliano Malizia: Gli archi di Roma. Newton Compton Ed., Rome, 2005
