= Porta Viminale =

Coordinates: 41.9025°N 12.5011°E

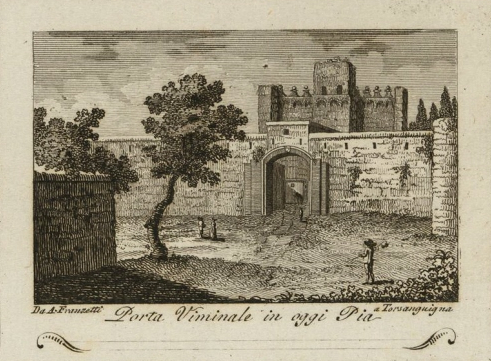
Porta Viminale around 1800

The Porta Viminale (Porta Viminalis) was a gateway in the Servian Wall of ancient Rome, at the centre of the most exposed stretch of the wall between the Porta Collina and the Porta Esquilina. These three gates and the Porta Querquetulana were the oldest in the wall.

Their construction dates back to a very ancient period, around 200 years before the construction of the Servian Wall in 378 BC. It seems that the four original gates can be dated to the time of the enlargement of the city by King Servius Tullius, which added to the territory of the city, in addition to the hills already inserted between the initial seven hills, the Quirinal (Collis Quirinali), the Viminal, the Esquiline, and the Caelian (then called Querquetulanus, meaning covered with oak woods). The first defensive bulwark that connected the hills is obviously of the same period, the agger built along the whole stretch of about 1,300 metres (4,300 ft) from Porta Collina to Esquiline, to try to defend the most vulnerable part of the city.

According to scholars, a further clue to the antiquity of these gates is also provided by their name, which derives directly from the name of the hill to which they gave access, rather than being the adjective of some monument, such as a temple or altar, located there, which could only be after the incorporation of the area into the urban perimeter.

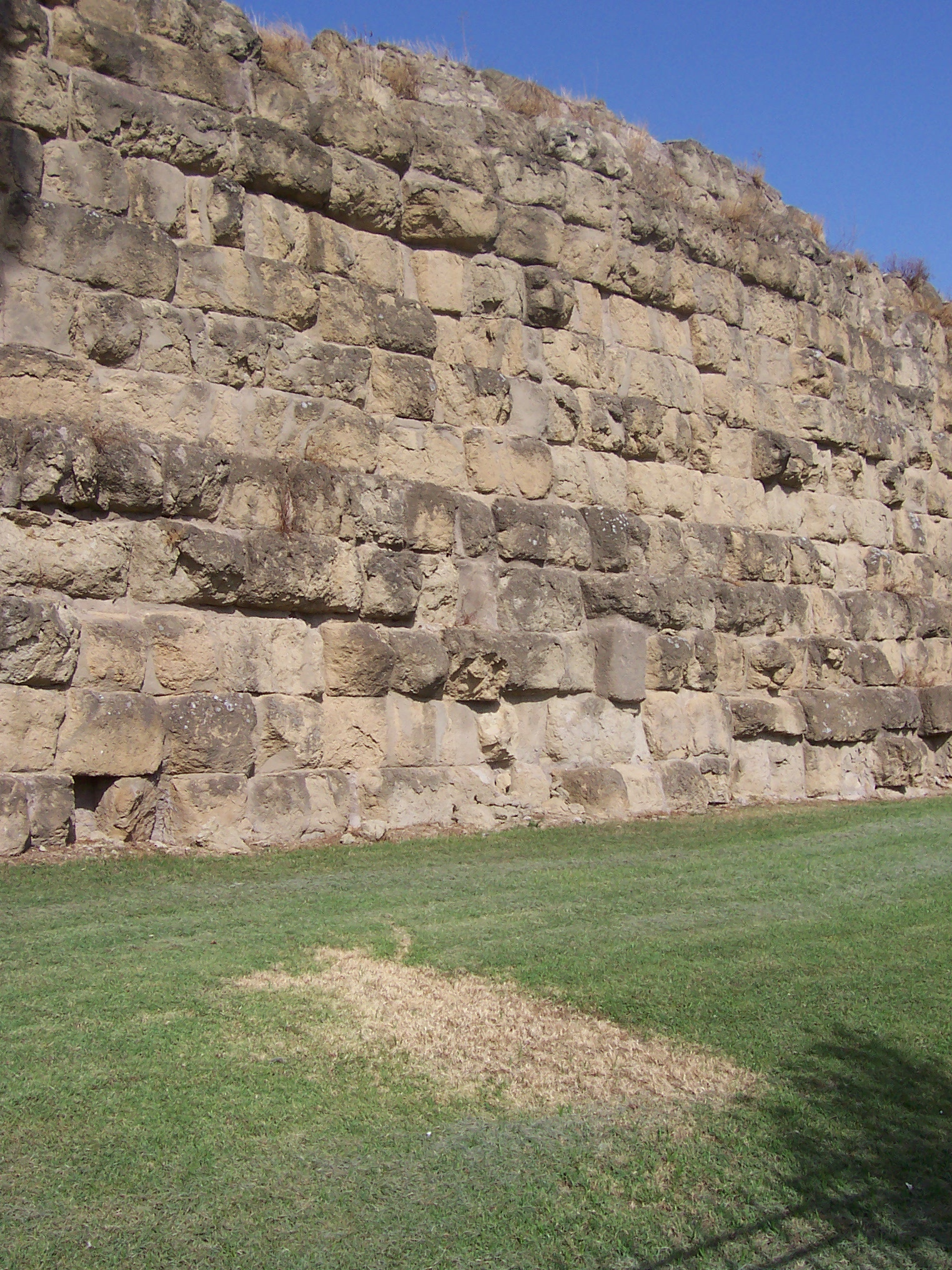
The Servian Wall at the Termini Station

The Porta Viminale opened approximately in the center of the long stretch of walls still existing in Piazza dei Cinquecento (the most impressive find still visible), on the right side of those leaving Termini Station. The garden that surrounds the walls covers the embankment of the ancient agger -- the slight slope on the flank of the square is but a faint reminder -- whose retaining wall is still visible in the basement of the station building.

The identification of the road or roads to which the gate gave access is still a topic of discussion among scholars. The Via Collatina and the Via Tiburtina have been suggested, or perhaps that it did not open onto any important road. The destruction carried out in the imperial era for the construction of the Baths of Diocletian, then by Pope Sixtus V for the urban renewal of the area, and finally for the construction of the station after 1856, have erased good part of the traces, not only of the walls but also of the gates (perhaps there was also a Porta Collatina near Via del Castro Pretorio, or in the railway station area), and of the original roads around the adjacent perimeter.

Work for the construction of the Termini station, however, had at least the merit of bringing to light the remains of the walls, which until 1892 had remained buried under an accumulation of debris, called "Monte della Giustizia", resulting from the work for the construction of the nearby Baths of Diocletian.

== Bibliography ==
- Strabo, Geographica, 5.3.7
- Mauro Quercioli: Le mura e le porte di Roma. Newton Compton Ed., Roma, 1982
- Laura G.Cozzi: Le porte di Roma. F.Spinosi Ed., Roma, 1968
- Filippo Coarelli: Guida archeologica di Roma. A.Mondadori Ed., 1984 ISBN 9788804118961
