= Campus Esquilinus =

Area on the Esquiline Hill in Ancient Rome

Campus Esquilinus was an area on the Esquiline Hill in ancient Rome. It was the site of many extravagant buildings as well as baths and gardens. The Campus Esquilinus was also the site of executions and burials, though it was eventually turned into a park by Augustus.

== Location ==
The Campus Esquilinus was the area of flat ground outside the Servian Walls and the double rampart of the Agger, between the Querquetulan Gate and the Colline gate. The name referred in particular to the area of the Esquiline Hill that lay outside the portas Esquilina during the end of the Republic and the rise of the Empire. Though its exact location is not known, it is likely that the Campus Esquilinus was located in via Labicana, and included present day Piazza Vittorio Emanuele and the area north of it. The part of the Esquiline Hill that contained the Campus Esquilinus was very decorative. The hill itself was covered with many elegant gardens, including the Horti Pallantiani, Horti Maecenatis and Horti Lamiani. Along with gardens, the hill was also the site of many lavish buildings.

== Structures ==
During the Great Roman Fire of 64 AD, the imperial residence on the Palatine Hill, the Domus Transitoria, burned down. The emperor Nero, who never enjoyed the Domus Transitoria, took this opportunity to construct his elaborate Golden House (Domus Aurea), which was completed in 68 AD and stretched from the Palatine Hill to the Esquiline Hill. Because of the popularity of the Esquiline Hill, the Flavians decided to construct the Baths of Titus right by the Domus Aurea. Later, from 104 to 109 AD, the even more elaborate Baths of Trajan were built by the architect Apollodorus atop the hill. These public baths were not only used as a place for bathing, but also as a location for social gatherings. The baths contained much of the Domus Aurea, and together they were the largest Roman structures built at the time.

== Functions ==
The main purpose of the Campus Esquilinus was as a burial site. A praetor's edict forbade cremation of bodies and dumping of manure or carcasses within the area of the Campus Esquilinus.(The carcasses mentioned in the edict were most likely from animals used for chariots, various Roman games, or simply wild beasts.) Because of these rules, the Campus Esquilinus became a location for human burials. The Campus Esquilinus contained part of early Rome's necropolis, which was mainly a place of burial for paupers, but was a burial site for wealthier Romans as well. Executions also took place at the Campus Esquilinus. Eventually though, the emperor Augustus took control of the Campus Esquilinus and remade it as a park.

== See also ==
- Campus Martius
