= Arch of Gallienus =

Ancient Roman arch, a landmark of Rome, Italy

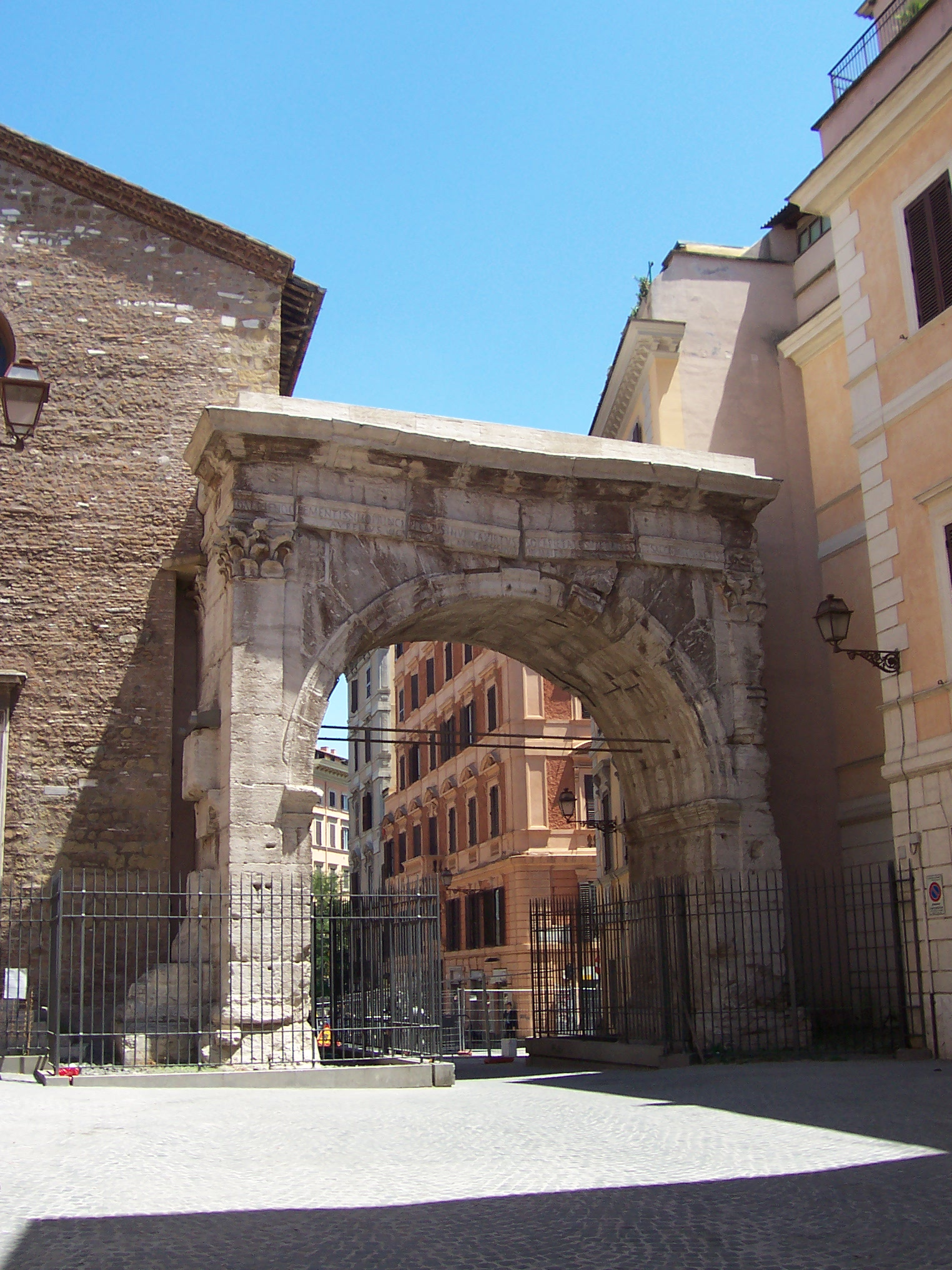
- Arch of Gallienus today

- Location within Rome
- Click on the map for a fullscreen view
- 41°53′45″N 12°30′05″E
- Type: Arch
- Location: Regione V Esquiliae

History
- Built: built during the Augustan age, rededicated in 262

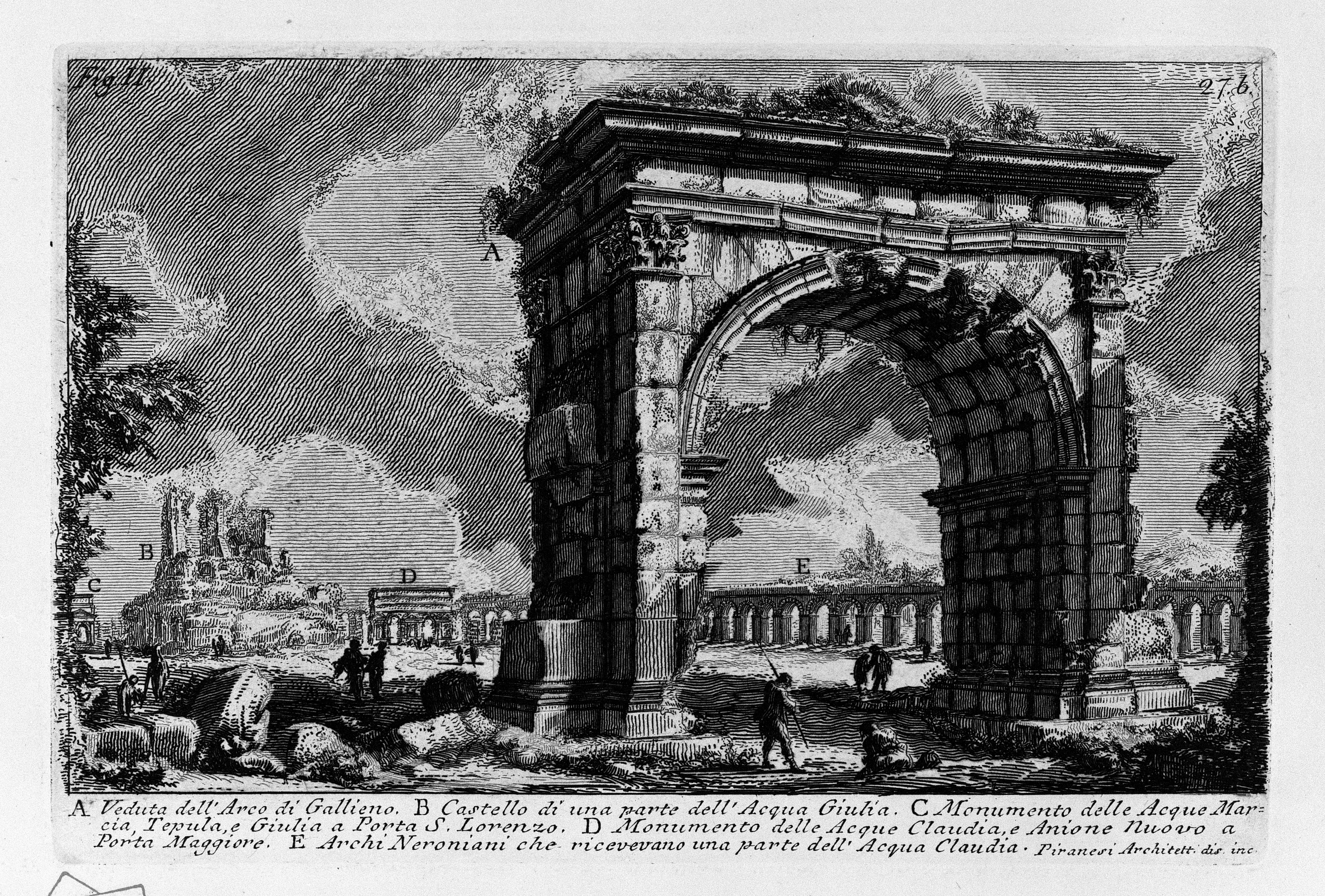
View of the Arch of Gallienus by Giovanni Battista Piranesi (c. 1750), etching

The Arch of Gallienus is a name given to the Porta Esquilina, an ancient Roman arch in the Servian Wall of Rome. It was here that the ancient Roman roads Via Labicana and Via Tiburtina started.

== History ==
The arch was rebuilt in monumental style in the Augustan period. It was not intended to be a triumphal arch but to serve as a gateway in the Republican city wall of Rome. In 262, the equestrian (Marcus) Aurelius Victor, member of the imperial household, rededicated the arch to the emperor Gallienus and his wife, Salonina, by replacing the original inscription. The purpose of the rededication was to balance the negative publicity which Gallienus had earned due to the various setbacks the Empire had suffered during his reign.

== Site ==
It still stands in the Via San Vito, the ancient Clivus Suburanus – the sequel, the Via S. Martino ai Monti, follows the course of the ancient Argiletum, the main road to the Roman Forum.

Already in the Augustan period the Porta Esquilina was taken as included in the Esquiline Forum, which included the market called the Macellum Liviae. When these buildings were abandoned in late antiquity, the diaconia and monastery of San Vito took them over, as recorded in the Einsiedeln Itinerary. It is this church against which the arch's remains now rest.

== Architecture ==
The surviving single arch is of travertine, 8.80 metres high, 7.30 wide, and 3.50 deep. It is supported by piers which are 1.40 metres wide and 3.50 deep. Outside these piers, there are two pilasters of the same depth, topped by Corinthian capitals. The pillars support a horizontal entablature which is 2 metres high and contains a dedicatory inscription on the architrave. There is a simple cornice on each side of the arch, beneath its spring. A drawing of the 15th century shows small side arches. These pedestrian arches were demolished during the 15th century.

== Inscription ==
GALLIENO CLEMENTISSIMO PRINCIPI	To Gallienus, the most clement princeps,
CVIVS INVICTA VIRTVS SOLA PIETATE	whose unconquered virtus is only outdone
SVPERACTA EST ET SALONINAE	by his pietas, and to Salonina,
SANCTISSIMAE AVGVSTAE AVRELIVS	most holy Augusta, Aurelius
VICTOR V[ir] E[gregius] DICATISSIMVS	Victor, the excellent man, [dedicated this] in complete devotion
NVMINI MAIESTATIQVE EORVM	to their numina and majesty

These two surviving lines represent the end of an inscription. The large rectangular blank space above them had marble slabs fixed onto it, with the beginning of the inscription – the drilled holes for these slabs' metal fixings are still visible. The missing part of the inscription probably named the emperor Valerian, father of Gallienus who was captured by the Sassanid Persians in 260.

== See also ==
- Arch of Janus – Ancient Roman arch in Rome, Italy
- List of Roman triumphal arches
- List of ancient monuments in Rome

== Sources ==
- Corpus Inscriptiorum Latinarum VI.1106

Preceded by Arch of Dolabella	Landmarks of Rome; Arch of Gallienus	Succeeded by Porta Esquilina
