= Querquetulanae =

Roman nymphs associated with oak trees

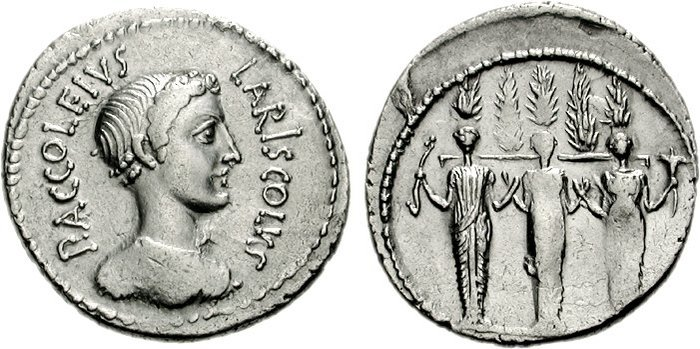
The five trees on the reverse of this denarius have sometimes been interpreted as representing the Querquetulanae

In ancient Roman religion and myth, the Querquetulanae or Querquetulanae virae were nymphs of the oak grove (querquetum) at a stage of producing green growth. Their sacred grove (lucus) was within the Porta Querquetulana, a gate in the Servian Wall. According to Festus, it was believed that in Rome there was once an oakwood within the Porta Querquetulana onto the greening of which presided the virae Querquetulanae.

== Etymology ==
Since the Querquetulanae are the nymphs of the sacred oak grove (querquetum), the word stems from Latin quercus, meaning 'oak'.

== In Festus ==
In his entry on the Querquetulanae, the grammarian Sextus Pompeius Festus says that their name was thought to signify that they were nymphs presiding over the oak grove as it began to produce green growth, and that the Porta Querquetulana was so called because this kind of woodland (silva) was just within the gate.

Festus says that virae in archaic Latin meant feminae, 'women', as if it were the feminine form of vir, 'man', and that the words virgines (singular virgo) and viragines (virago) reflect this older usage. Virgo, from which the English word virgin is derived, meant a young woman who had just reached the age to be with a man (vir): in the Etymologies of Isidore, "she is said to be a virgo on account of her youthful bloom and vigor" (viridiori aetate). In ancient etymologies, the concepts of vis (plural vires), 'power, force, energy', and viriditas, 'flourishing vigor', were thought to belong to a semantic group that included vir, virtus, and the virgo or vira who possessed "youthful vigor, growth, fertility, freshness, and energy".

== Denarius of Accoleius Lariscolus ==
A denarius issued by Publius Accoleius Lariscolus around 43–41 BC has sometimes been thought to represent the Querquetulanae on its reverse side. In this view, the head on the obverse represents a bust of Acca Larentia.

A.B. Cook interpreted the three female figures on the reverse as "archaistic caryatids" bearing a beam on which five trees are supported. He saw the nymph on the left as holding a bow, and the one on the right holding a lily. The trees, however, he identified as more likely to represent larches (larices, singular larix), from which he derives the name Lariscolus ('young larch'), hence embodying the sisters of Phaëton transformed to larches. Alföldi established the currently dominant view that the reverse represented a "triple goddess" statue in a cypress grove, with Diana Nemorensis on the obverse to represent the origin of the gens Accoleia in Aricia. Diana, however, had an affinity with the oak, and had an ancient sanctuary on the Mons Querquetulanus (see below).

== Lares Querquetulani ==
The Lares Querquetulani ('tutelaries of the oak grove') had a shrine (sacellum) on the Esquiline. These Lares may be connected to the Querquetulanae, depending on where their grove is to be located. One of the former peoples listed by Pliny who participated in the Latin Festival were the Querquetulani. Palmer thought their name in conjunction with the Lares Querquetulani and the Querquetulanae virae indicated the existence of a curia called Querquetulana, since only a few names of the thirty curiae are known. The Querquetulanae virae may have also been tutelaries of the Latin Querquetulani. As indicated by inscriptions, in general Lares and nymphs might be the joint recipients of cultus in Italy and share the same sacred space.
