= Macellum Liviae =

Coordinates: 41°53′50″N 12°30′09″E

Macellum Liviae ("market of Livia") was a shopping complex built by Augustus in the name of his wife Livia built on the Esquiline Hill in Rome.

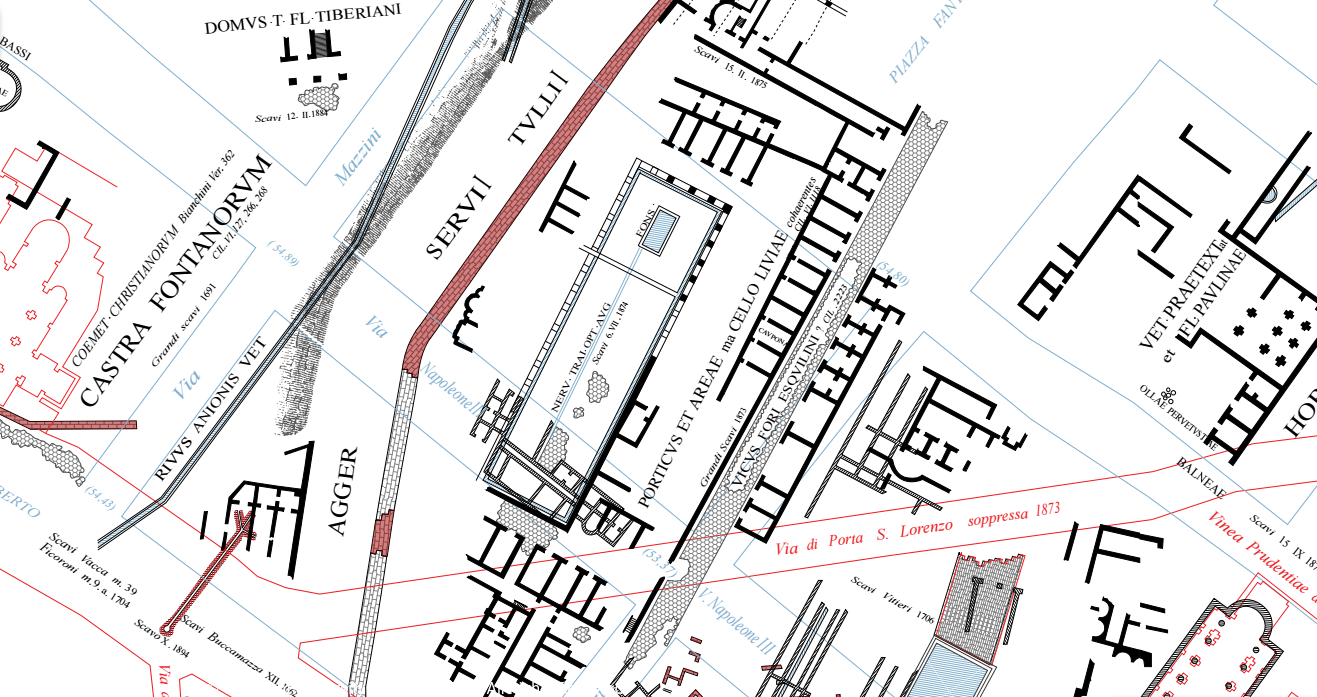
Plan of ancient Rome superimposed on modern Rome; the Macellum Liviae lies on the northwest side of Via Urbano Rattazzi, between Via Napoleone III and Via Principe Amedeo

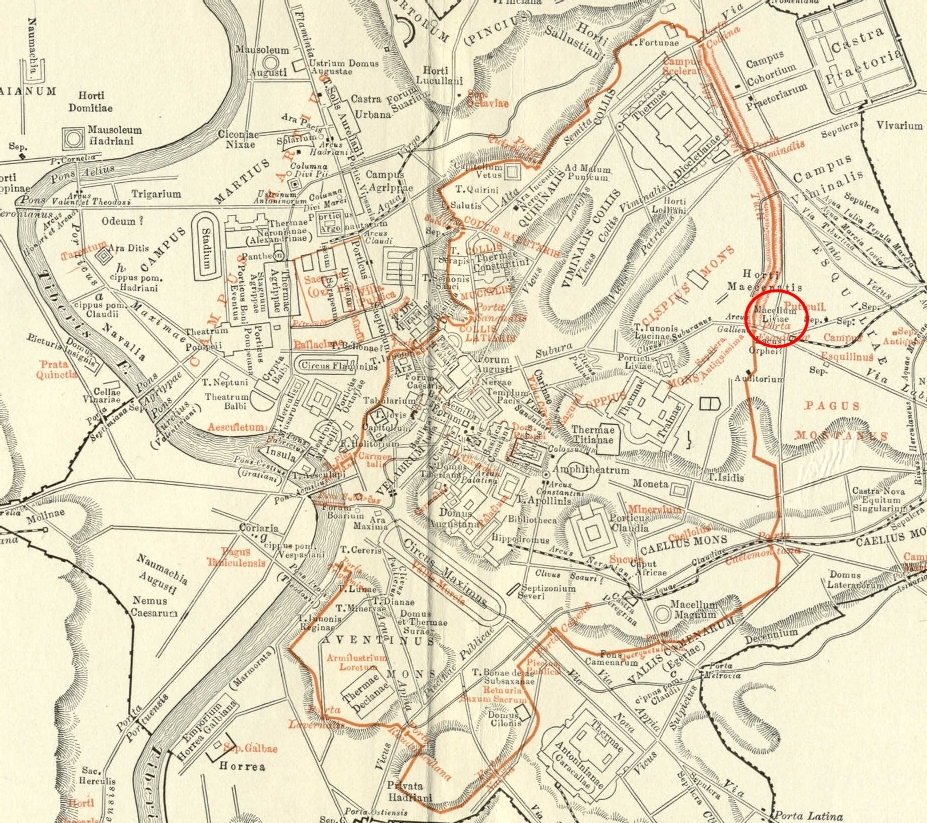
Map of Rome with Macellum Liviae circled

== Literary evidence ==
Probably to be identified with τὸ τεμένισμα τὸ Λίουιον ὠνομασμένον (to temenisma to Liouion ōnomasmenon, "the precinct called 'the Livium' "), which Tiberius dedicated at the beginning of 7 BC. A restoration between 364 and 378 by Valentinian I, Valens and Gratian is recorded in an inscription, and either this macellum or the Macellum Magnum is marked on fragment 4 of the Severan Marble Plan of Rome.

In the Chronicle of Benedict of Soracte under the year 921, the aecclesia Sancti Eusebii iuxta macellum parvum (church of Sant'Eusebio next to the small market) is mentioned. In the Liber Pontificalis the church of Santa Maria Maggiore was described as iuxta macellum Libiae (next to Libia's market), and that of San Vito in Macello; and the processional route described by the Lateran canon Benedict, the Ordo Benedicti of 1143, notes intrans sub arcum ubi dicitur macellum Livianum ("ientering under the arch [of Gallienus] where it is called the Livian market").

== Archaeology ==
Ruins corresponding with these literary indications have been found just outside the porta Esquilina, north of the road, which may well have been those of this macellum. They consist of an open court, 80 m × 25 m (262 ft × 82 ft), built of brick in opus reticulatum, and parallel with the line of the Servian Wall. This was surrounded with a porticus and shops for various kinds of wares. The southern part of this area seems to have been encroached upon by private dwellings as early as the third century.
