= Arch of Dolabella =

Ancient Roman arch, a landmark of Rome, Italy

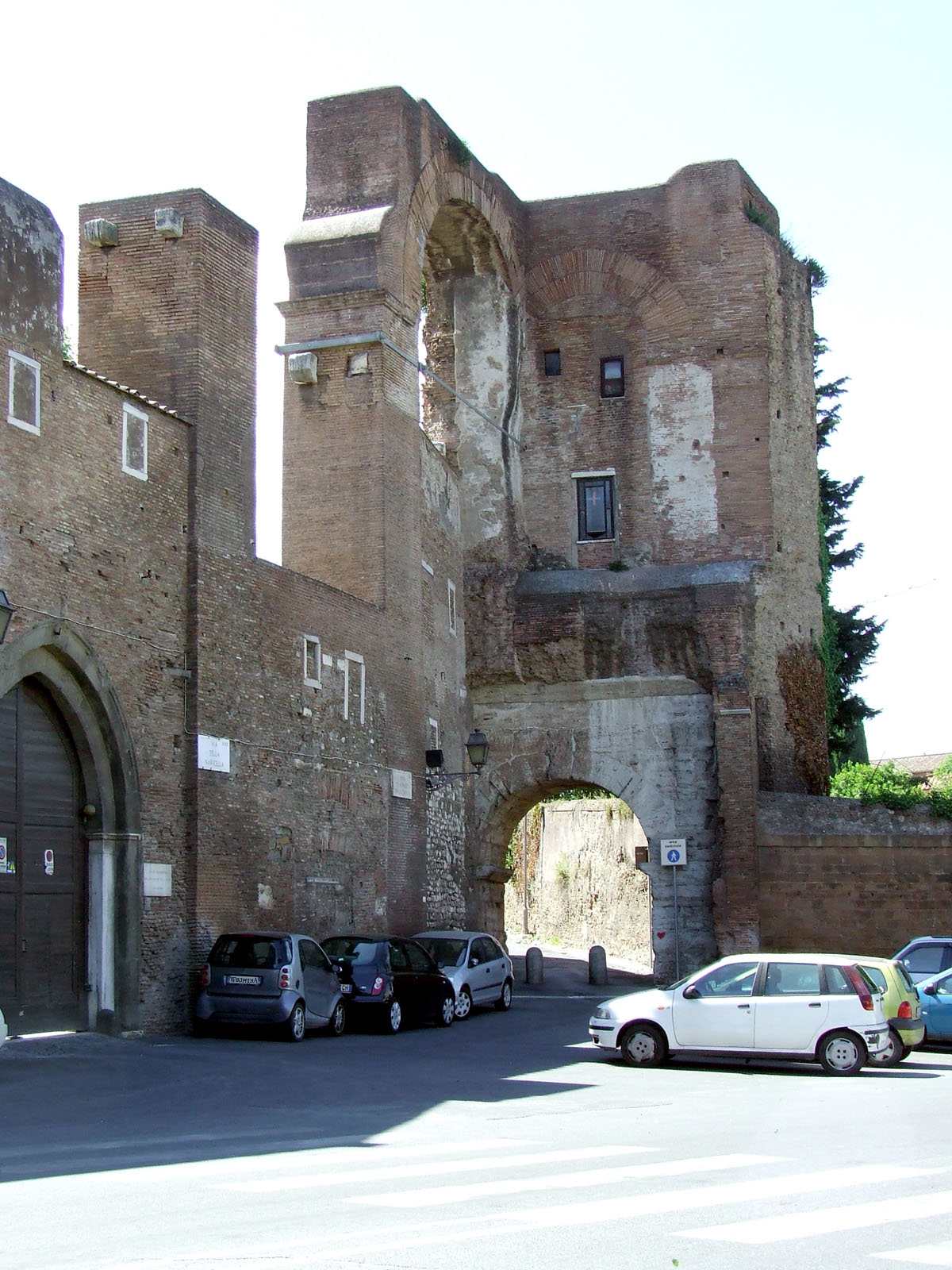
- The Arch of Dolabella, ca. 2007

- Location within Rome
- Click on the map for a fullscreen view
- 41.8856°N 12.4952°E
- Location: Rome

The Arch of Dolabella and Silanus (Latin, Arcus Dolabellae et Silani) or Arch of Dolabella is an ancient Roman arch. It was built by senatorial decree in 10 AD by the consuls P. Cornelius Dolabella and C. Junius Silanus.

== Arch ==
The arch is located on the Caelian Hill, at the north corner of the site of the Castra Peregrina. It spans the modern Via di S. Paolo della Croce, along the line of the ancient Clivus Scauri. Its location indicates that it was a rebuilding of one of the gates of the Servian Walls, though which one is unclear: possibly the Porta Querquetulana (or Querquetularia) or the Porta Caelimontana. Although the latter is considered the more likely original, there is no indication that any important road went out of the city through the Caelimontana.

== History ==
The extension of the Aqua Claudia undertaken during the reign of Nero made use of the Arch of Dolabella for the last section. Its original purpose was probably to support a branch of the Aqua Marcia.

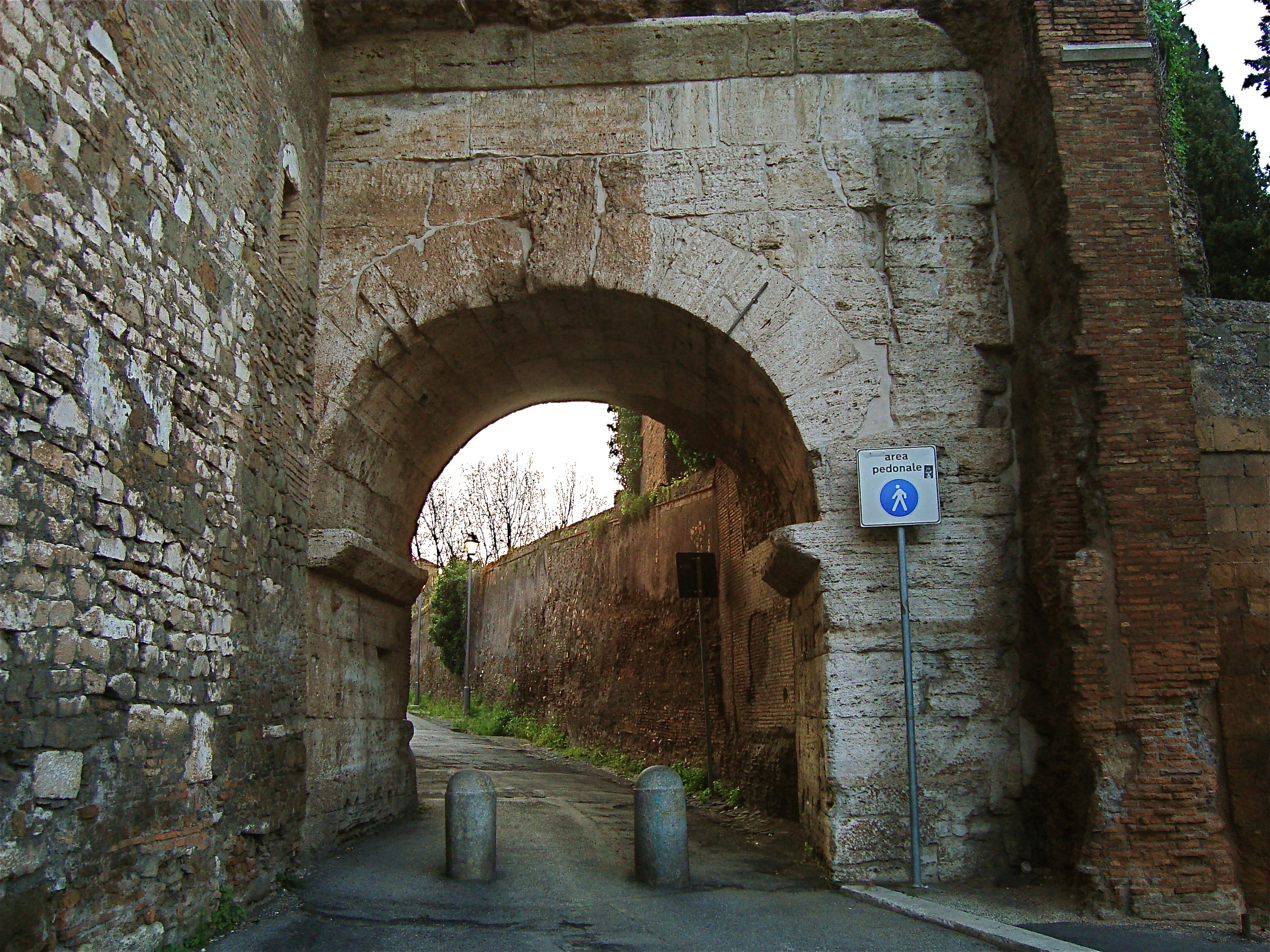
Close up view

The travertine arch was not decorated with sculptural relief.

== See also ==
- Arch of Drusus – Ancient Roman arch, a landmark of Rome, Italy
- List of ancient monuments in Rome

Preceded by Porta Caelimontana	Landmarks of Rome; Arch of Dolabella	Succeeded by Arch of Gallienus
