= Lina Snellman =

Finnish deacon and Writer (1846–1924)

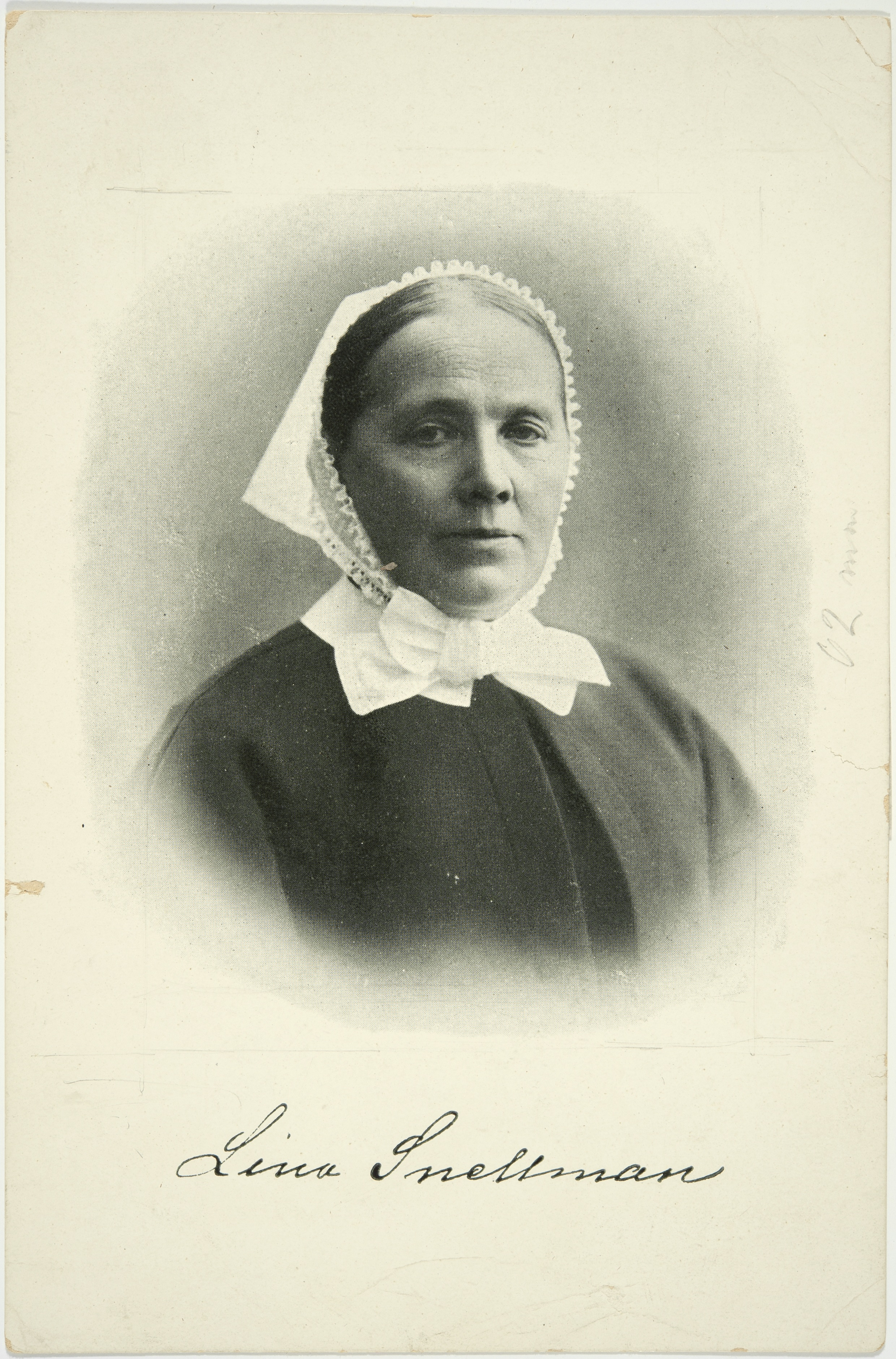
- Lina Snellman in the early 1890s.
- Born: 7 November 1846; Oulu, Finland
- Died: 14 August 1924 (aged 77); Helsinki
- Occupation: Writer

Sofia Karolina (Lina) Snellman (7 November 1846 Oulu – 14 August 1924 Helsinki) was a Finnish deacon, Writer and director of the Helsinki Deaconess Institute in 1883–1924. She published booklets dealing with the field of diaconia and significantly promoted diaconia work in Finland.

== Selected bibliography ==
- Om diakonissverksamheten förr och nu [About the former and current diaconal work]. Edlund, 1896.
- Theodor Fliedner : hans lif och verksamhet [Teodor Fliedner: his life and influence]. Edlund, 1896.
- Till öfverstinnan Karamzines minne : Diakonissanstaltens systrar och vänner tillägnadt af L.S-n [In memory of Colonel's wife Karamzine: Sisters and friends of the deaconess institution dedicated by L.S.] Finland Irene Rosenqvist. Söderström & C:o, distributor, 1909.
- Diakonissan Cecilia Blomqwist : en minnesteckning [Deaconess Cecilia Blomqvist: a eulogy]. Writer, 1911.
- För våra systrar : från diakonisshuset i Helsingfors [To our sisters: from the Helsinki Deaconess Institute]. Helsinki Deaconess Institute, 1911.
- Anna Hermanson : några drag af en lifsbild [Anna Hermanson: some excerpts from her biography]. Writer, 1913.
- De skandinaviska diakonisshusen [Scandinavian deaconess institutes]. Writer, 1914.
- Sjukvårdsteorier I och II : att vårda med härna, hjärta och hand [Nursing theory I and II : with knowledge, skill and love]. Editor Birgitta Geust and Eeva Hurskainen. Diamus – Museum of the Helsinki Deaconess Institute, 2014
