= Porta Naevia =

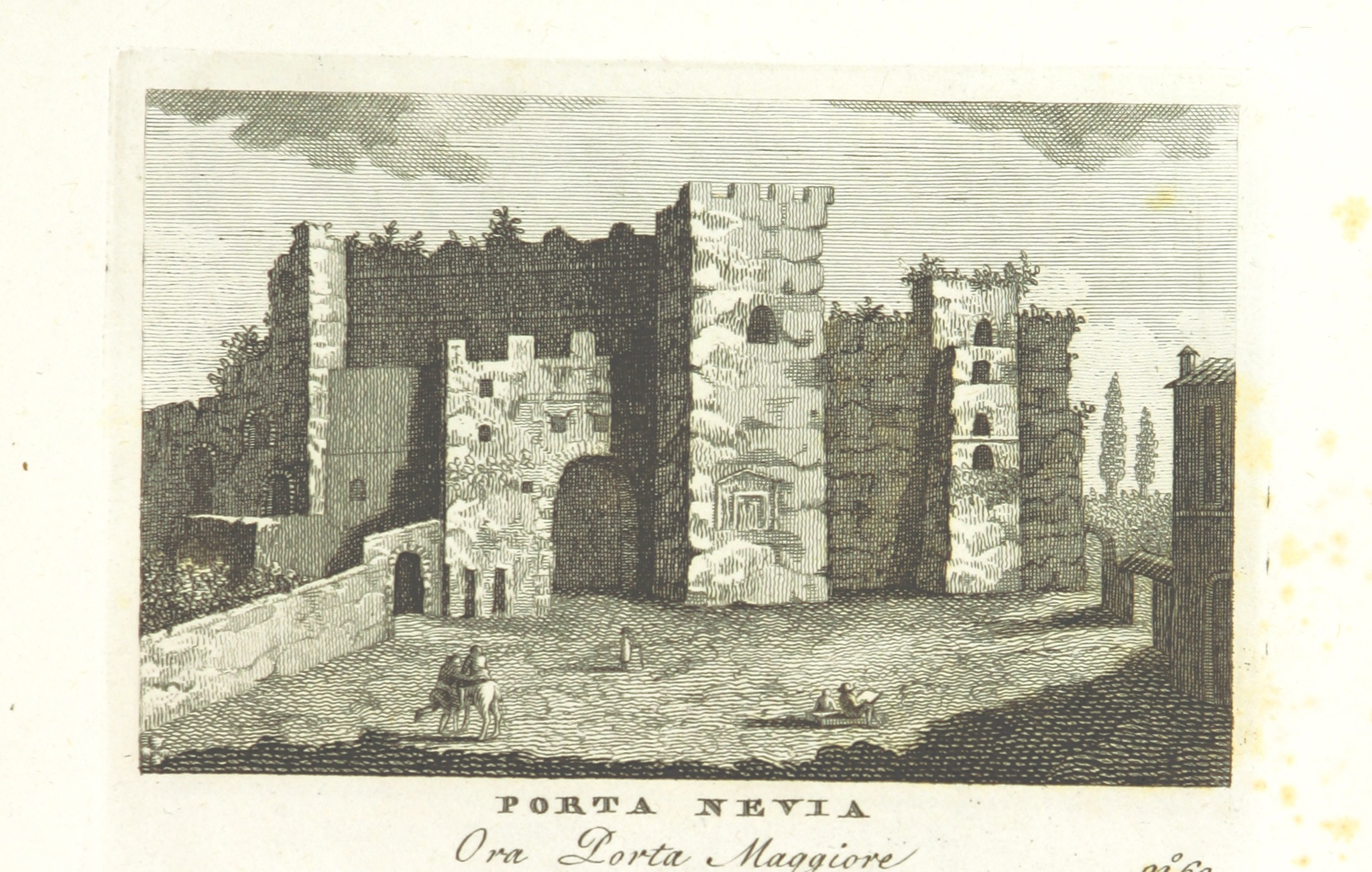
Porta Naevia

The Porta Naevia was a minor gateway in Rome’s Servian Wall.

Located in the 12th Augustan region, according to Marcus Terentius Varro’s description the gate was almost certainly situated on the minor summit of the Aventine Hill (Aventinus Minor), in between the churches of Santa Balbina and Santa Sabina. The Via Ardeatina emerged from this gate.

According to an apocryphal story recounted by the 4th century historian Festus, this gate was supposedly named after a grove called Naevia that had once belonged to a man named Naevius. Over time the grove obtained an unsavoury reputation due to the criminals and homeless people who would frequent the area.
