= Catacombs of San Zotico =

Coordinates: 41.850465°N 12.667922°E

The Catacombs of San Zotico is a catacomb complex at the tenth mile of the ancient via Labicana in Rome, in an area now beside via Nicolosi in the Borghesiana zone. It was begun in the late 3rd century and was linked to the memory of the martyred saints Zoticus and Amantius, whose day of martyrdom was recorded as 10 February in the 5th century Martyrologium Hieronymianum. Early in the 8th century Irenaeus and Hyacinth were also linked to these two saints.

They were discovered early in the 18th century. They were excavated and restored from 1998 onwards by the Pontificia commissione di archeologia sacra, the Soprintendenza Archeologica di Roma and the chair for Christian Archaeology at the Archeologia Cristiana dell'Università degli Studi di Roma Tor Vergata.
