= Porta Querquetulana =

Coordinates: 41.8883°N 12.4986°E

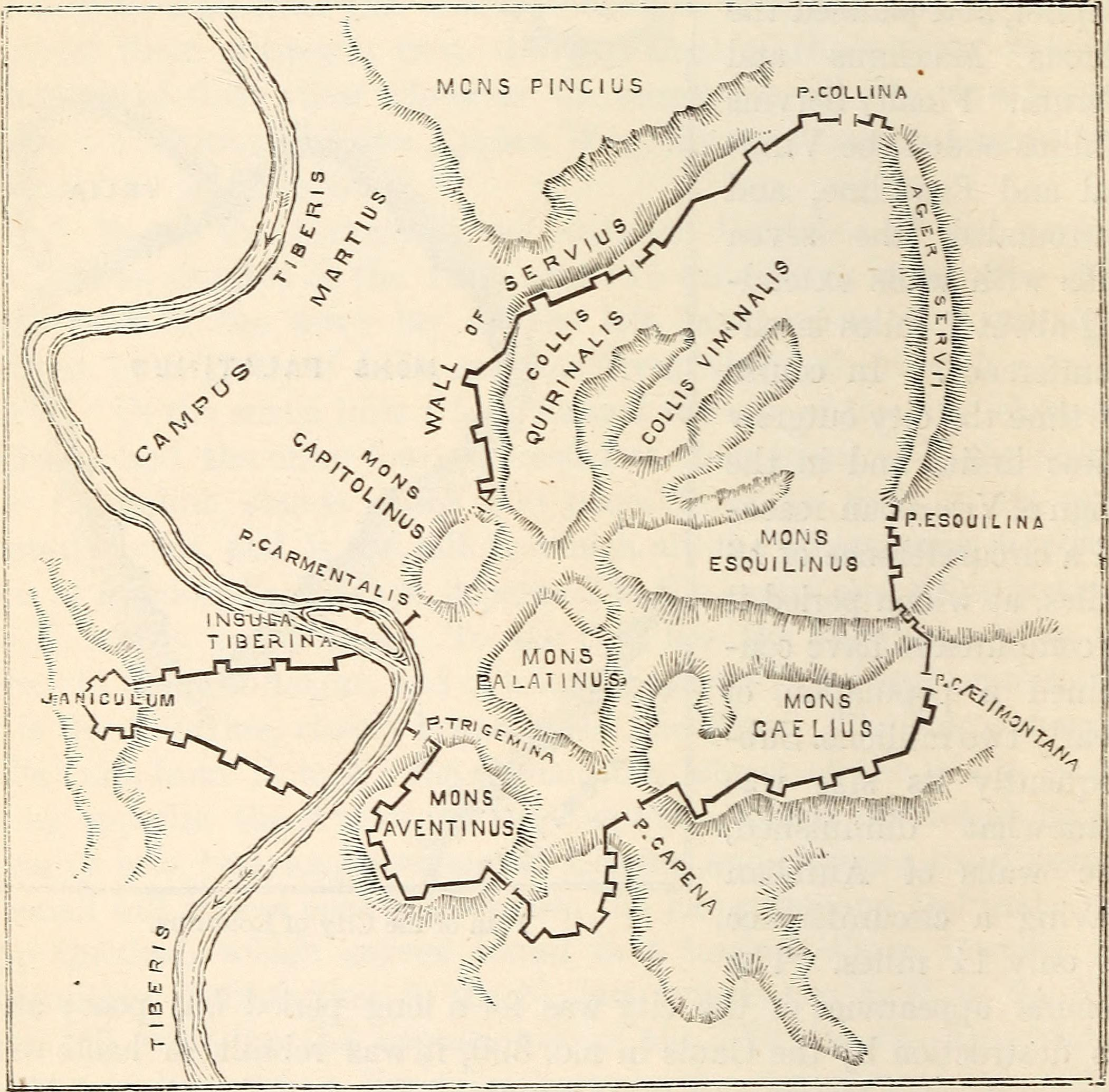

The Porta Querquetulana or Querquetularia was a gateway in the Servian Wall, named after the sacred grove of the Querquetulanae adjacent to and just within it. The grove appears not to have still existed in the latter first century BC.

The location of the gate is problematic. Lawrence Richardson located it at the edge of Regio V Esquiliae, with the Clivus Scauri passing through it. Platner located the gate and the wood on or near the Caelian Hill, but between the Porta Capena and the Porta Caelimontana. The Caelian Hill was supposed to have been named Mons Querquetulanus before it was settled by Caelius Vibenna and named for him, and the location of the gate on the Caelian is based in part on the earlier name.

In the early twenty-first century, photogrammetric data and 3D visualization have suggested that the grove of the Querquetulanae may have been incorporated into the Gardens of Maecenas. A nymphaeum from the time of Hadrian would have replaced the natural spring within it. In this view, the grove was located in Regio III, along the Via Labicana. A location on the Esquiline Hill is also possible. Pliny places the Porta Querquetulana between Jupiter Fagutalis and the Viminal Hill, and thus within the Esquiline.
