= Clivus Scauri =

Short road following the route of an ancient Roman road in the centre of Rome, Italy

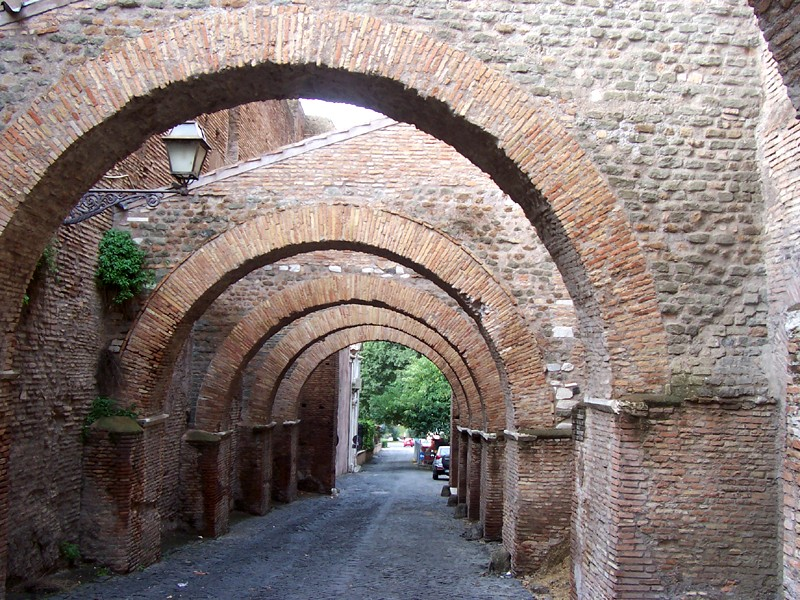
The Clivus Scauri

The Clivus Scauri was an ancient Roman road that originally branched off from the road that connected the Circus Maximus to the Colosseum along the depression between the Palatine and Caelian hills of Rome. It followed the east side of the latter, up to its summit, which is today known as Piazza della Navicella. In the initial section the road has retained the old name. It becomes Via di S. Paolo della Croce further up the hill.

The Clivus Scauri now begins at the church of San Gregorio al Celio, and runs along the side and underneath the buttresses of the Basilica of Saints John and Paul. The street name occurs only in documents of the 6th and 10th centuries but is probably ancient, and may be the vicus Scauri of one inscription. It probably owes its origins to the Aemilia Scauri family, possibly Marcus Aemilius Scaurus.

The road has suggestively preserved an ancient appearance, with some sections flanked by homes from the time of the Roman Empire, and large parts of the facades preserved and linked. On the right opposite the Piazza Santi Giovanni e Paolo are brick remains from the third century, consisting of a row of tabernae (small shops), with traces of a second floor. In the piazza, at the base of the campanile, are ruins of the Temple of the Divine Claudius. The final stretch of the road leads to the Porta Caelimontana, preserved as the Arch of Dolabella. The original purpose of this arch was probably to support a branch of the Aqua Marcia.
