= Diaconia =

Type of social welfare organization

A diaconia was originally an establishment built near a church building, for the care of the poor and distribution of the church's charity in medieval Rome or Naples. In contemporary theology, the word diakonia presents a variety of connotations and representations.

== History of the institutions ==
A diaconia was originally an establishment built near a church building, for the care of the poor and distribution of the church's charity in medieval Rome or Naples (the successor to the Roman grain supply system, often standing on the very sites of its stationes annonae) Examples included the sites of San Vito, Santi Alessio e Bonifacio, and Sant'Agatha in Rome, San Gennaro in Naples (headed by a deacon named John in the end of the ninth and the beginning of the tenth century. The popes allocated to the Romans bathing through diaconia, or private Lateran baths, or even a myriad of monastic bath houses functioning in eighth and ninth centuries.

In the 1830s initiatives within German Lutheranism started the creation of communities of men and especially of women who were dedicated exclusively to the works of charity so desperately needed in the wake of social dislocations created by industrialization and the Napoleonic wars. By the 1930s such institutions had opened in many cities in central and northern Europe. The geographical spread was accompanied by the growth of a distinctively modern diaconal spirituality centered on the servant roles of the deacon and deaconess in their meeting the needs of the poor and the destitute.

== Meaning and spelling of the term ==
An alternative spelling, diakonia, is a Christian theological term from Greek (διακονία) that encompasses the call to serve the poor and oppressed. The terms deaconess and diaconate also come from the same root, which refers to the emphasis on service within those vocations. In scripture deacons were those whom the Church appointed to dispense alms, and take care of the poor.

Diakonia is a term derived from Greek, used in the New Testament of the Bible, with several meanings. Sometimes, it refers to a specific kind of help to people in need. At other times, it means to serve the tables, while another use refers to the distribution of financial resources. Diaconia contained public bathing facilities to serve both the clerics and needy poor people.

Also in contemporary theology, the word diakonia presents a variety of connotations and representations. For FLD (Diakonal Lutherans Foundation in Brazil), diakonia means serve to change people's lives, to contribute to the construction of citizenship of the less fortunate. Diakonal activities include but are not limited to the provision of medical care, long-term care for the elderly and the socially underprivileged, support for migrants and their integration, Roma inclusion, job coaching, etc.

The term diakonie is a constant reminder of the selfless love taught by Jesus in such gospel passages as Luke 10:25–37, the story of the Good Samaritan. Early disciples were particularly responsive to the fact that the Jesus had lived, taught, and died in lowly circumstances. They thought that if the master had chosen to be seen as a servant, the leaders of congregations had to follow.

The word has now come to mean the titular church of a Cardinal Deacon.

== Diaconal education ==
The second volume of Gerhard Kittel's Theologisches Wörterbuch zum Neuen Testament (Theological Dictionary of the New Testament) can be considered as the scholarly prop on which the contemporary view of ministry/diakonia leans.

== Current usage ==
Diakonie logo featuring the Kronenkreuz cross

=== Germany ===
Diakonie Deutschland is one of the largest social welfare organizations in Germany. It is one of six members of BAGFW, the federal association of free social welfare organizations. The parent organization and its members employed 599,282 people in 2018 and were supported by about 700,000 volunteers. At the start of 2018 Diakonie Deutschland had 31,594 institutions and services offering a total of 1,174,765 places/beds.

=== Austria ===
Diakonie Österreich in Austria had circa 9,000 employees and was supported by 1,500 volunteers in 2017.

=== South Africa ===
The Diakonia Council of Churches is "an ecumenical, inter-church agency, working with churches and church organisations in the pursuit of a more just society", in the eThekwini Municipality, which covers Durban, KwaZulu-Natal, South Africa. It has presented an award known as the Diakonia Award, also known as the Diakonia Human Rights Award, since around 2006. Recipients have include:

- 2008: Michael Lapsley, director of the Institute for Healing Memories in Cape Town
- 2010: Bishop Rubin Phillip
- 2017: Coral Vinsen
- 2019: Public Protector and advocate Thuli Madonsela
