= Porta Esquilina =

Ancient gate in the Servian Wall, Rome

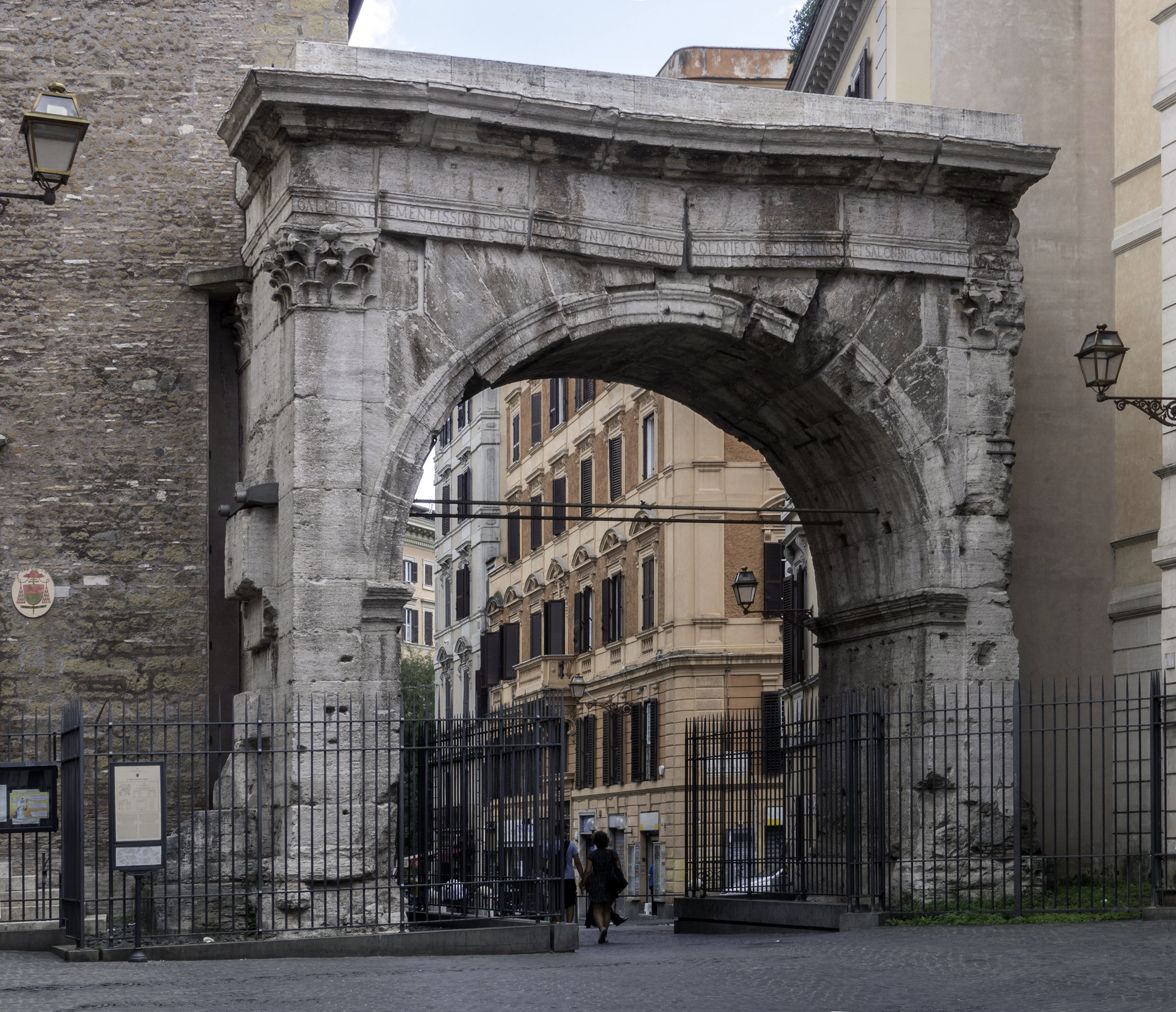
- The Arch of Gallienus, the ancient Porta Esquilina

- Shown within Augustan Rome
- Interactive map of Porta Esquilina
- 41°53′45″N 12°30′05″E
- Type: Ancient city gate / Triumphal arch
- Periods: Roman Republic, Roman Empire, Late antiquity
- Cultures: Roman
- Satellite of: Roman Republic, Roman Empire
- Part of: Servian Wall

History
- Built: c. 4th century B.C. (Servian phase); c. late 1st century B.C. (Augustan triple-arch)
- Built by: Augustus (reconstruction); Marcus Aurelius Victor (rededication)
- Abandoned: c. 3rd century A.D. (superseded by the Aurelian Walls)

Site notes
- Material: Travertine (Augustan rebuild); originally volcanic tuff
- Height: 8.80 m (28.9 ft) high
- Length: 3.50 m (11.5 ft) deep
- Width: 7.30 m (24.0 ft) wide (surviving central arch)
- Condition: Partially ruined (only the central arch survives)
- Owner: State property
- Management: Soprintendenza Speciale Archeologia Belle Arti e Paesaggio di Roma
- Public access: Yes

The Porta Esquilina (or Esquiline Gate) was a gate in the Servian Wall, of which the Arch of Gallienus is extant today. Tradition dates it back to the 6th century BC, when the Servian Wall was said to have been built by the Roman king Servius Tullius. However modern scholarship and evidence from archaeology indicate a date in the fourth century BC. The archway of the gate was rededicated in 262 as the Arch of Gallienus.

== Location ==
The Porta Esquilina allowed passage between Rome and the Esquiline Hill at the city’s east before Rome expanded with the later Aurelian Wall. The Esquiline Hill served as Rome’s graveyard during the Republic and later as an area for the horti and the emperor’s most beautiful gardens such as the Gardens of Maecenas. Connecting northward to the Esquiline Gate was the agger, the heavily fortified section of the Servian Wall. Just southwest of the Esquiline Gate were notable locations such as Nero’s Golden House, the Baths of Titus, and Trajan’s Baths. Two major roads, the via Labicana and the via Praenestina, originate at the Porta Esquilina but lead out of Rome as a single road until they separate near Rome's outer, Aurelian Wall.

== History ==
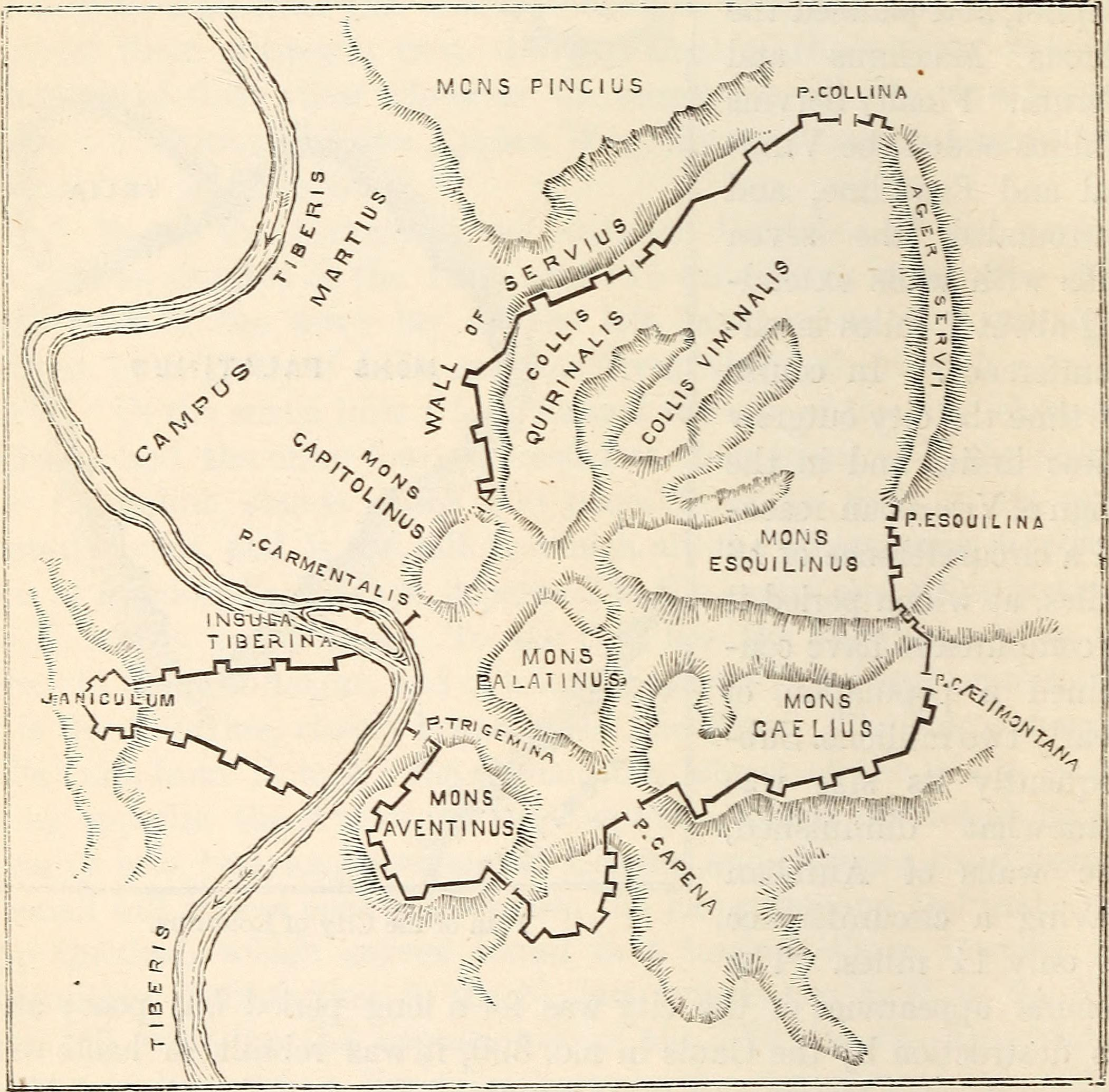
The gate is located in the eastern section of the Servian Wall.

Following from the concept of the pomerium, there seems to be an unofficial Roman “tradition” that certain killings were to be done “outside” the city and thus several ancient authors include the Esquiline Gate in their descriptions of such deeds. For example, in Cic. Pro. Clu. 37 the murder of Asinus of Larinum was done outside the Esquiline Gate, and in Tac. Ann. ii. 32, the astrologer Publius Marcius was executed by consuls outside the Esquiline Gate.

The Esquiline gate is also mentioned in ancient literature as an important way of entering and exiting Rome. Livy writes about the consul Valerius’ strategic plan to lure out Etruscan pillagers that had been preying on Roman fields. Valerius ordered cattle, which had been previously brought to safety within the city walls, to be sent outside through the Esquiline Gate so that when the Etruscans came down south to seize the cattle, the Romans could ambush the Etruscans from all sides. Cicero, in a speech deemphasizing the greatness of triumphal processions, mentions how he trampled his own Macedonian laurels underfoot while entering Rome through the Esquiline Gate and this suggests that the Esquiline Gate was used for triumphal processions. Another example of the Esquiline gate in ancient literature comes from Plutarch’s description of Sulla’s first march on Rome. Sulla ordered the Esquiline Gate secured and sent some of his forces to go through it. However, bricks and stones were hurled upon them by citizens that Marius had recruited to defend the city.

Initially, the site of the Porta Esquilina was marked by a single arch that was built in the 1st century AD, but it later became a triple arch structure in the 3rd century AD that had a peak height of 8.8 m. The conversion to a triple arch was sponsored by the equite M. Aurelius Victor in 262 AD to honor the Roman emperor Gallienus. Although archaeological evidence shows signs of extra pillar foundations, Aurelius Victor’s additional arches did not survive and today only the original, single arch remains.

Preceded by Arch of Gallienus	Landmarks of Rome; Porta Esquilina	Succeeded by Lateran Obelisk
