= Agger (ancient Rome) =

Embankment or artificial elevation

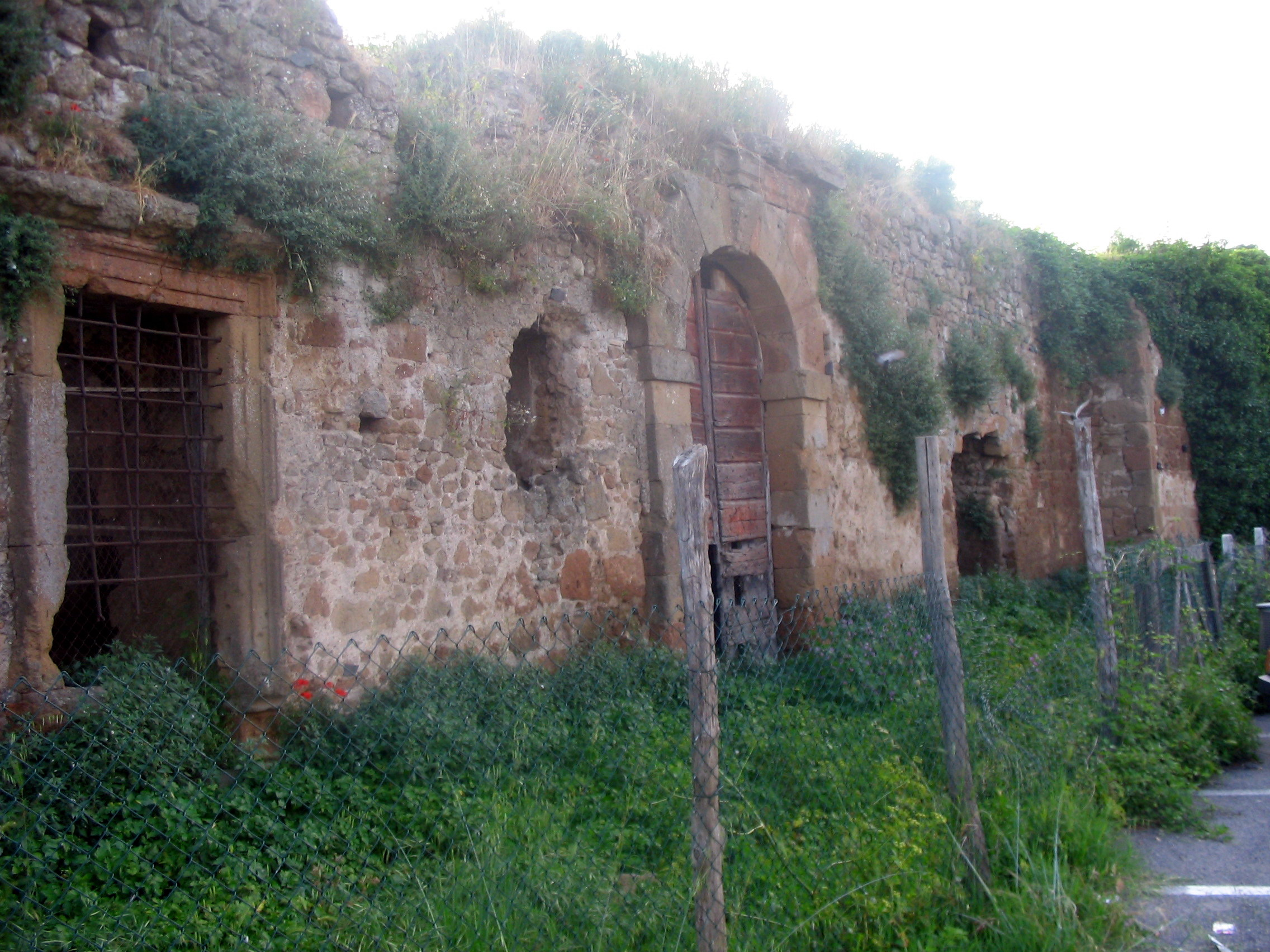
Remains of the agger of Ardea, Italy

An agger (Latin) is an ancient Roman linear mound or embankment. The word is sometimes applied to fortifications, such as the Agger Servianus, a part of the Servian Wall of Rome, which protected the city on its most vulnerable side, the Campus Esquilinus. It consisted of a double rampart bearing formidable fortifications. In modern usage however, particularly in British archaeology, it is most commonly used to describe the ridge or embankment on which Roman roads were built. The course of a Roman road can often be traced today by the distinctive line of the agger across the landscape and even when destroyed by agriculture, the vestigial mound that can persist has allowed archaeologists in recent years to trace the course of many Roman roads using lidar.

== Fortification ==
The agger, as a defensive earthwork, emerged in Latium by the 8th-century BCE, typically around the least naturally defensible areas of a settlement. Such a defensive strategy was likely spurred by the local geology of Central Italy, which consists primarily of hilly terrain, allowing for settlements to rely largely on natural protection and only supplement their surroundings with limited human-made fortifications. Various Latial sites contain evidence of other categories of defensive structure. For instance, in Rome, there is evidence of a wooden palisade—dated to period III—that was built atop a trench filled with tufa bound by clay.

== Roman road aggers ==
The road agger was usually constructed by first clearing the topsoil, before excavating a shallow trench along the line of the road, although in some instances military roads were built directly onto the existing surface without even removing vegetation. A firm base was laid (in Britain only 28% of cases were of stone), before the agger was then built, usually from materials sourced close to the road, including stones, earth, sand and clay, sometimes in layers, often not, but always rammed hard into a solid mass. Some of this material came from excavating the ditches (fossae) which usually accompany a Roman road. These ditches were often set some distance from the agger, when their function seems to have been to define the road, rather than provide drainage, although In upland areas, with higher rainfall and more difficult terrain, it is quite usual to find the ditches next to the agger to assist with drainage. Since the ditches were often (but not always) quite shallow, termed 'scoop ditches' by archaeologists, further road material was frequently sourced from quarry pits close to the road, which can often form long lines, or merge to form what is in effect a quarry ditch. Only rarely was material brought in from a distance. This use of local materials, especially on military roads (viae militares), means that occasionally there was no stone at all in the agger construction. Finally, the agger was metalled with small stones in a matrix of smaller materials such as gravel and earth, and cambered to ensure good drainage off the road surface. Paved roads are hardly ever found outside towns, not even near Rome itself.

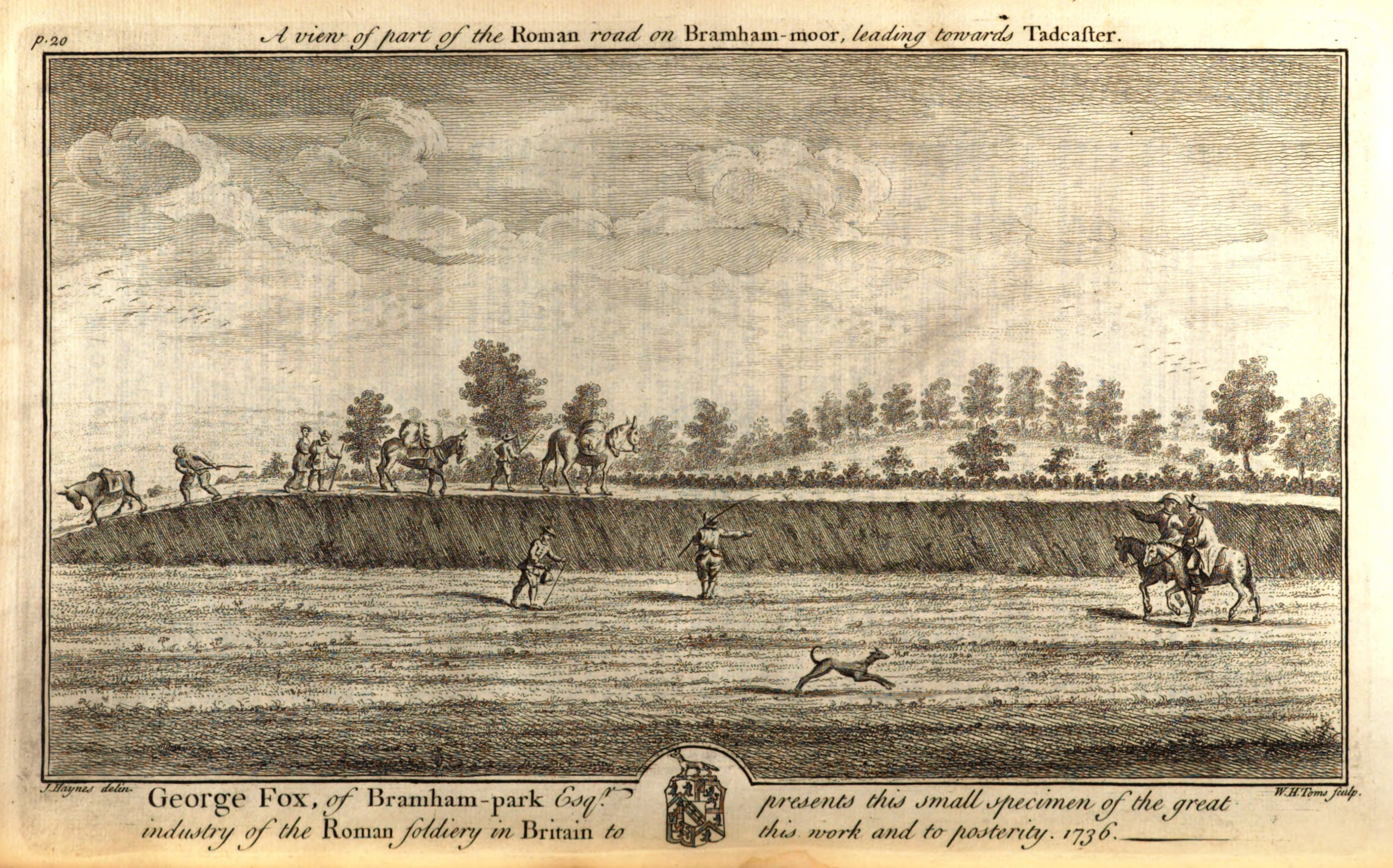
Engraving of part of the Roman Ridge (or Rigg) on Bramham Moor in 1736, from Francis Drake's 'Eboracum'.

The aggers of a few important Roman roads in Britain, and in Europe, survive as high linear mounds and until relatively recently many scholars believed that they were built that way. For example, Ermine Street north of Lincoln, which survives in places up to 1.5m high and in excess of 15m wide, was described by Margary as being 'one of the most magnificent in Britain, rivalled only by Ackling Dyke'. The other Roman road from Lincoln to York was known as the Roman Ridge at various places between Doncaster and Tadcaster, and stood nearly 2m high and was still in use in the 18th century, as recorded by an engraving in Francis's Drake's Eboracum of 1736. However, modern archaeological investigation has shown (on this road and others), that when first built these road aggers were generally not large at all - it was the successive resurfacings and reconstruction adding more and more material to the aggers which caused them to get spectacularly large. For example, when investigated near the end of Tillbridge Lane, the original Roman agger of Ermine Street was found to have been just 6.5 m wide and 50 cm high with most of the huge agger being post-Roman and possibly as recent as the 18th century.
