= Via Labicana =

Ancient road of Italy

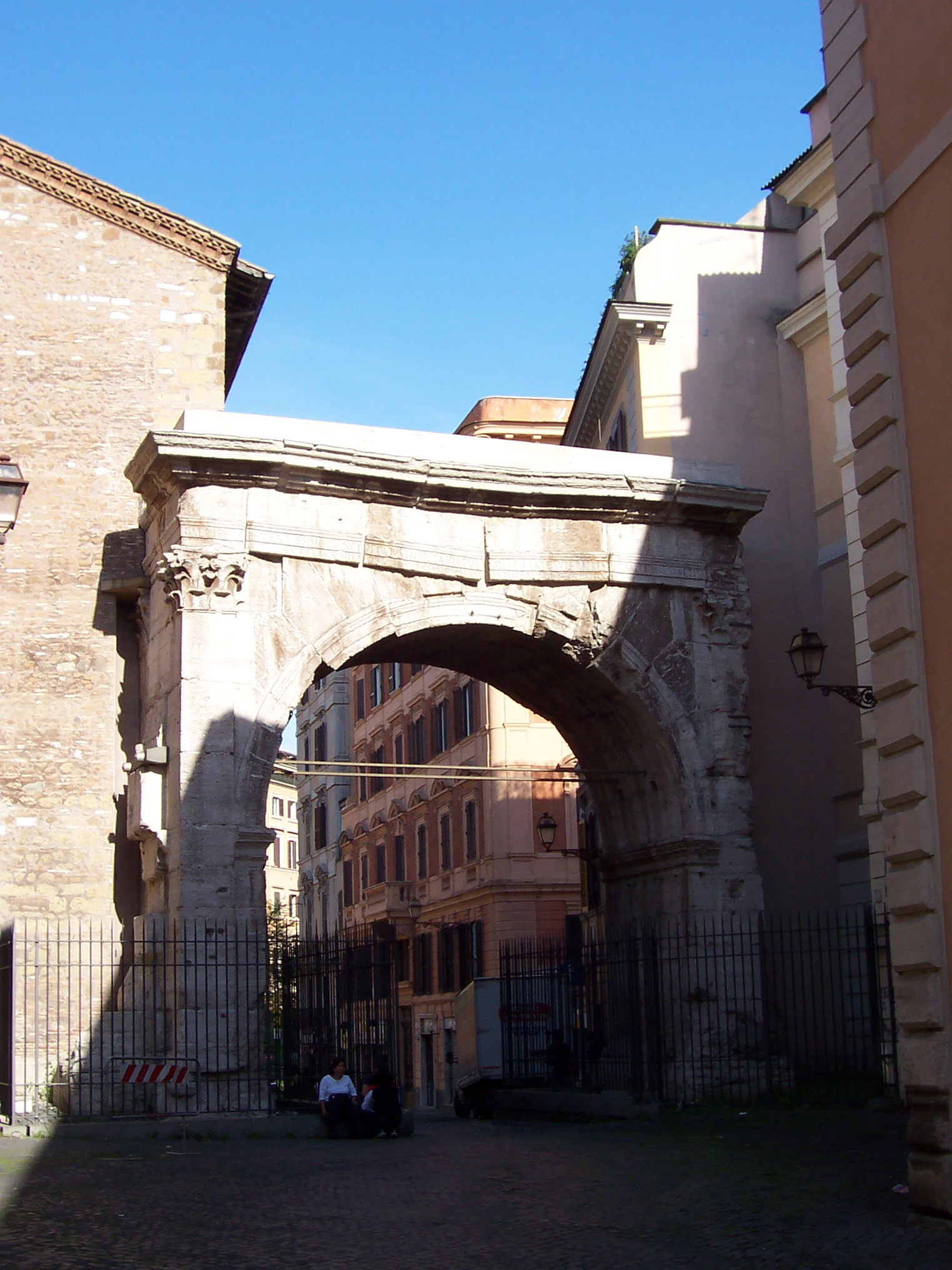
The arch of Gallienus was the old Porta Esquilina in the Servian Wall. It was the start of the intra moenia portion of via Labicana.

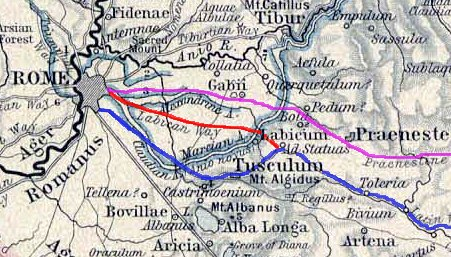
Via Labicana (shown in red)

The Via Labicana was an ancient road of Italy, leading east-southeast from Rome. The course after the first six miles from Rome is not taken by any modern road, but it can be clearly traced from remains of pavement and buildings. It seems possible that the road at first led to Tusculum, was then extended to Labici, and later became a road for through traffic. As the preferred way to the southeast, the Via Labicana may even have superseded the Via Latina. The Via Labicana's summit just west of the Mount Algidus pass, calls for some 22 metres (72 ft) less of a climb overall. Beyond the two roads' reunion, the route was probably called Via Latina rather than Via Labicana.

Via Labicana entered Rome through the Aurelian Walls via the ancient monumental gate of Porta Prenestina, and reached, after an internal part, the Servian Wall, entering through the Porta Esquilina, decorated with the arch of Gallienus. The section of the road near Rome is now known as the Via Casilina. The remains of the Tomb of the Haterii can be found along this road. A statue of Augustus as pontifex maximus found at a villa of Livia on this road is known as the "Via Labicana type" and is housed at the National Roman Museum. The Roman Emperor Didius Julianus was buried by the fifth milestone on the Via Labicana, after being executed in 193. The ancient church of Santi Marcellino e Pietro al Laterano was built at the intersection with via Merulana near the catacombs where the remains of St Marcellino and St Pietro were found.

== Roman bridges ==
There are the remains of at least one Roman bridge along the road, which crosses the Fosso del Giardinetto 11 kilometres (6.8 mi) east of Rome.

== See also ==
- Roman road
- Roman bridge
- Roman engineering
- Catacombs of San Zotico
