= Porta Caelimontana =

Historic site in Rome, Italy

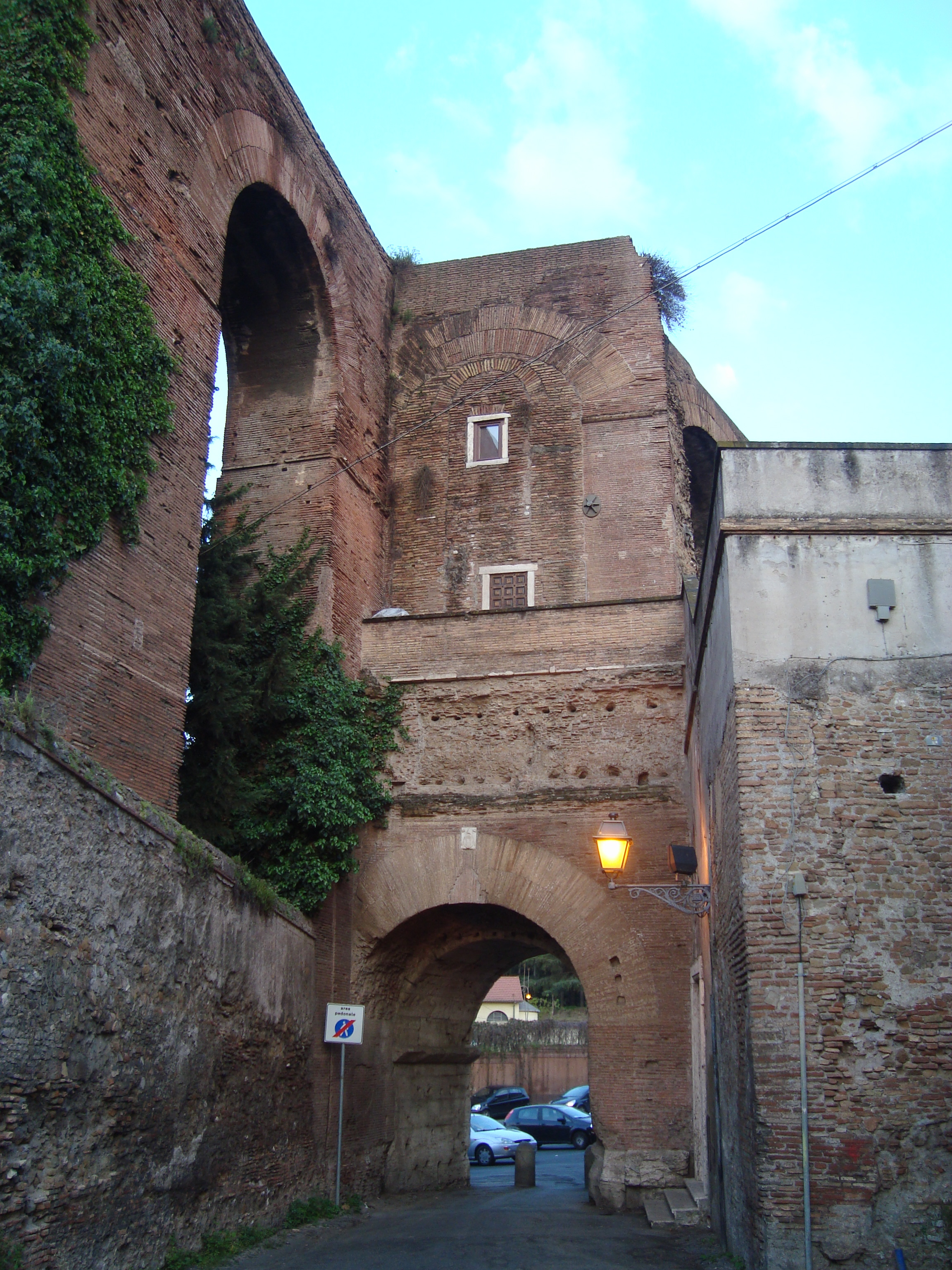
- The Porta Caelimontana

- Location within Rome
- Interactive map of Porta Caelimontana
- 41.8856°N 12.4952°E
- Location: Rome

The Porta Caelimontana or Celimontana was a gate in the Servian Wall on the rise of the Caelian Hill (Caelius Mons).

== Use ==
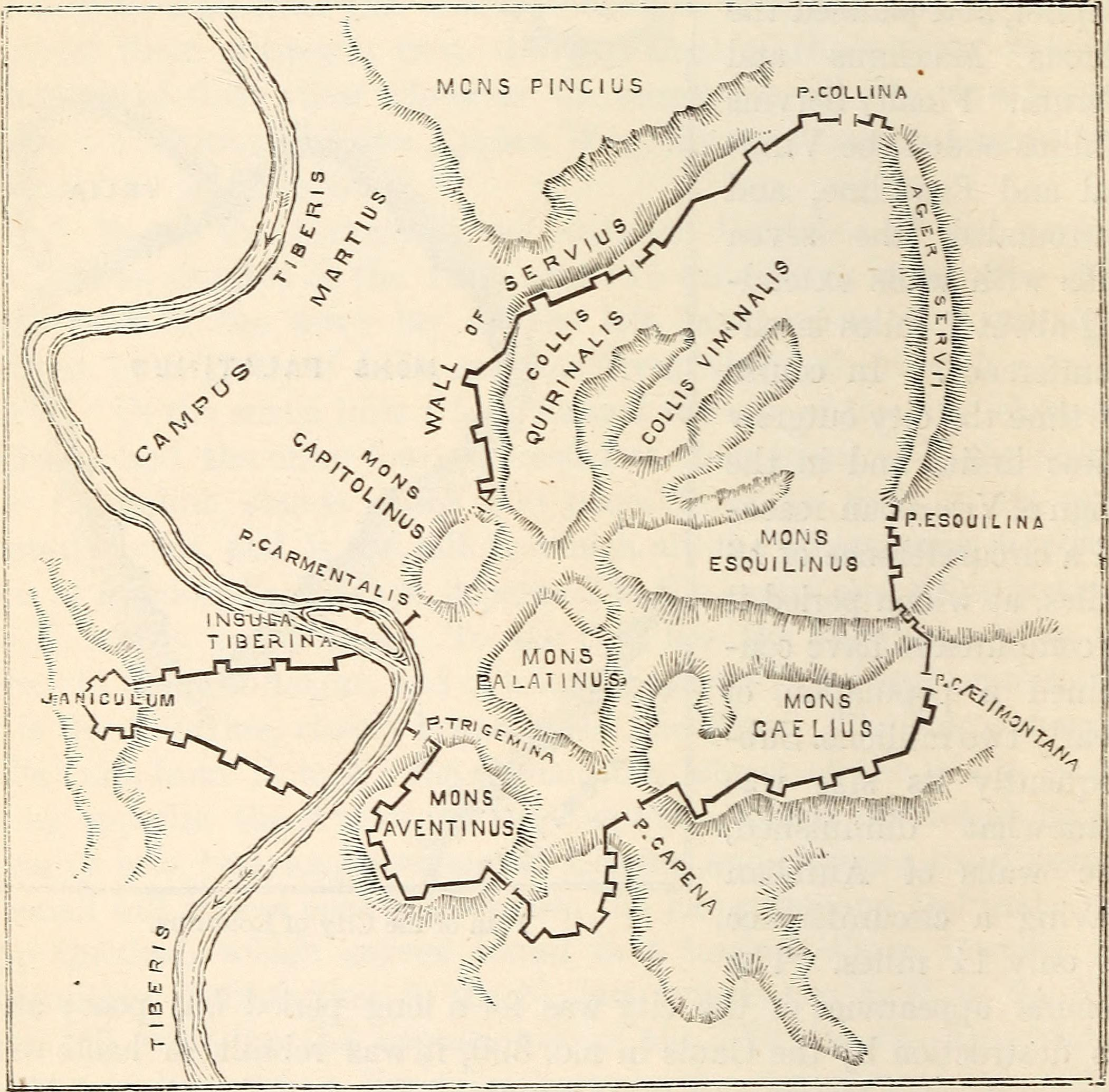

The Via Caelimontana ran from it; in the late 19th and early 20th centuries, Roman tombs were discovered along its southern edge, some of which have disappeared.

== History ==
The gate was rebuilt during the principate of Augustus. According to an inscription, the Arch of Dolabella was built in the area in AD 10, during the consulship of Dolabella and Silanus, but there is disagreement over whether this arch was the reconstruction of the Porta Caelimontana. The arch was incorporated into the support structure for the branch aqueduct of the Aqua Claudia built during the reign of Nero, it is presumed during the rebuilding program that followed the Great Fire of 64.

During the Renaissance, the Porta Caelimontana was a toll gate.

Preceded by Servian Wall	Landmarks of Rome; Porta Caelimontana	Succeeded by Arch of Dolabella
