= Baths of Diocletian =

Ancient Roman bath in Rome, Italy

- Thermae Diocletiani (Latin)
- Italian: Terme di Diocleziano
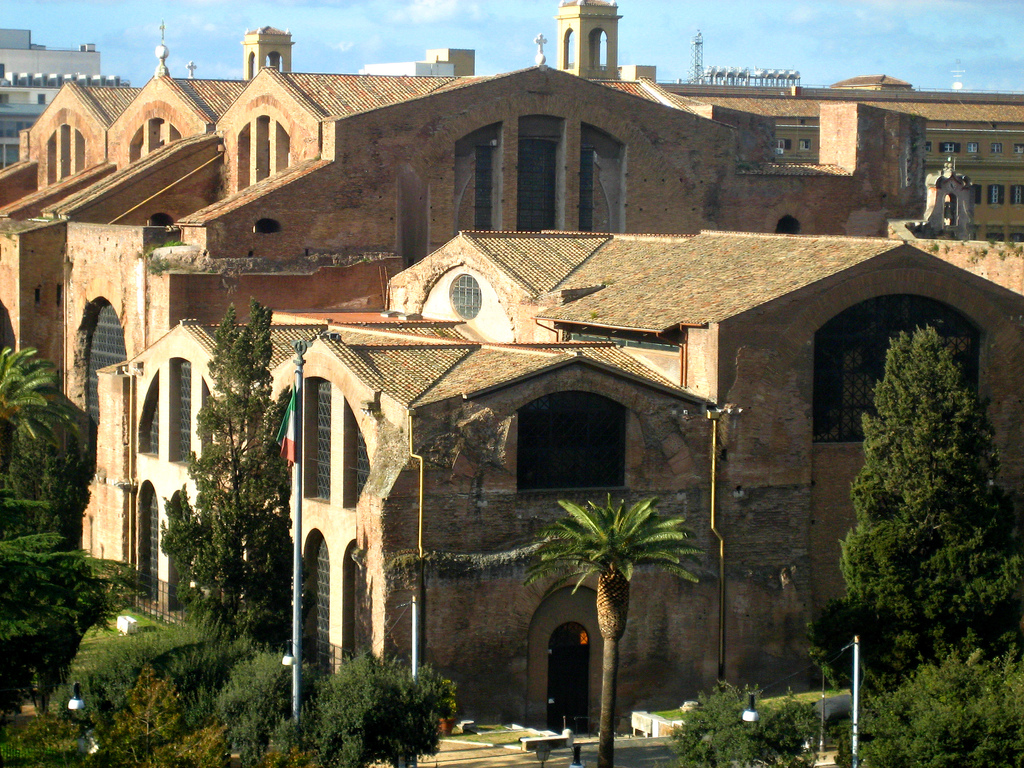
- Baths of Diocletian, with the basilica of Santa Maria degli Angeli e dei Martiri built in the remains of the baths.

- The location of the baths in Rome during Antiquity
- The location of the baths today
- 41°54′11″N 12°29′53″E
- Type: Thermae
- Periods: Imperial
- Location: Rome, Italy
- Region: Regio VI Alta Semita
- Part of: Ancient Rome

History
- Built: 298–306 AD
- Built by: Maximian
- Abandoned: circa 537 AD

Site notes
- Condition: partially in ruins, partially reused in other structures
- Public access: Museum

The Baths of Diocletian (Latin: Thermae Diocletiani, Italian: Terme di Diocleziano) were public baths in ancient Rome. Named after emperor Diocletian and built from AD 298 to 306, they were the largest of the imperial baths. The project was originally commissioned by Maximian upon his return to Rome in the autumn of 298 and was continued after his and Diocletian's abdication under Constantius, father of Constantine.The site houses the Basilica of Santa Maria degli Angeli e dei Martiri, built within the ruins in the 16th century, the Church of San Bernardo alle Terme, and part of the National Roman Museum.

== Location ==
The baths occupy the high ground on the northeast summit of the Viminal, the smallest of the Seven hills of Rome, just inside the Agger of the Servian Wall (near what are today the Piazza della Repubblica and Termini rail station). They served as baths for the people residing in the Viminal, Quirinal, and Esquiline quarters of the city. The Quadrigae Pisonis, a 2nd-century monument with various reliefs, some private homes, and a relief representing the temple of Quirinus once stood at the site but were demolished to build the baths. The water supply was provided by the Aqua Marcia, an aqueduct that had long served the city of Rome since the early 2nd century. To properly supply the baths, the supply of water to the city was increased under the order of Diocletian. The baths may have also been supplied by the Aqua Antoniniana, which was originally positioned to supply Caracalla's baths in the early 3rd century.

== History ==
The baths were commissioned by Maximian in honour of co-emperor Diocletian in AD 298, the same year he returned from Africa. Evidence of this can be found in bricks from the main area of the baths, which distinctly show stamps of the Diocletianic period. This evidence shows the effect of the massive project on the brick industry in that all work by them was redirected and under the control of the emperor. Building took place between the year it was first commissioned and sometime between the abdication of Diocletian in 305 and the death of Constantius in July 306.

In the early 5th century, the baths were restored. The baths remained in use until the siege of Rome in 537 when the Ostrogothic king Vitiges cut off the aqueducts.

According to the medieval guidebook Mirabilia Urbis Romae, the baths were then known as "Palatium Diocletiani".

In the 1560s, Pope Pius IV ordered the building of a basilica in some of the remains, to commemorate Christian martyrs who according to tradition died during the baths' construction, Santa Maria degli Angeli e dei Martiri. To this was attached a Carthusian charterhouse. Michelangelo was commissioned to design the church and he made use of both the frigidarium and tepidarium structures. He also planned the main cloister of the charterhouse. A small cloister next to the presbytery of the church was built, occupying part of the area where the baths' natatio had been located. After 1575, starting under Pope Gregory XIII, several remaining halls of the baths were converted into grain and oil stores for the city of Rome.

After Rome became part of the Kingdom of Italy, its seat of government was moved to the city. In 1884, the Carthusians abandoned the charterhouse and the area around the baths was subject to substantial changes. Roma Termini station was built, the Ministry of the Economy moved to the area, and the Grand Hotel and Palazzo Massimo were constructed. Gaetano Koch designed the palazzi fronting Piazza dell'Esedra (now Piazza della Repubblica), destroying part of the original exedra. Via Cernaia cut off the western gymnasium from the remains of the enclosure wall (the latter are now in Via Parigi). In 1889, the Italian government set up the Museo Nazionale Romano in the baths and in the charterhouse.

=== Moses Jacob Ezekiel studio ===
Moses Jacob Ezekiel (October 28, 1844 – March 27, 1917) was an American sculptor who established an artist's studio in the Baths of Diocletian — where he lived and worked from 1879 to 1910, selling his works internationally including as commissions in the United States.

Here in the vaulted thermae built in the days of Diocletian he had gathered together treasures from many lands and ages. Ancient marbles and alabasters, bronzes, costly metals and relics beautified with precious stones, medieval parchments and church ornaments, oriental ivories, velvets and silks hung on all sides, in alluring contrast to the latter-day furniture and the twentieth-century grand piano, proclaiming the broad sympathies and the catholic tastes of this citizen of the world.

— American Jewish Yearbook, 1917

Ezekiel's studio was regarded as "one of the Show Places of the Eternal City, magnificent in proportions and stored with fine artworks." He held an open house there every Friday afternoon, in addition to hosting musicales, where could be heard "the finest music by the greatest talent". Visitors to his studio included:

- Gabriele d'Annunzio
- Queen of Italy Margherita of Savoy
- General and future US President Ulysses Grant
- Franz Liszt
- Emperor Wilhelm II of Germany

After 30 years, the government "demand[ed] the possession of this part of the ruins as an adjunct to the National Roman Museum."

== Description ==
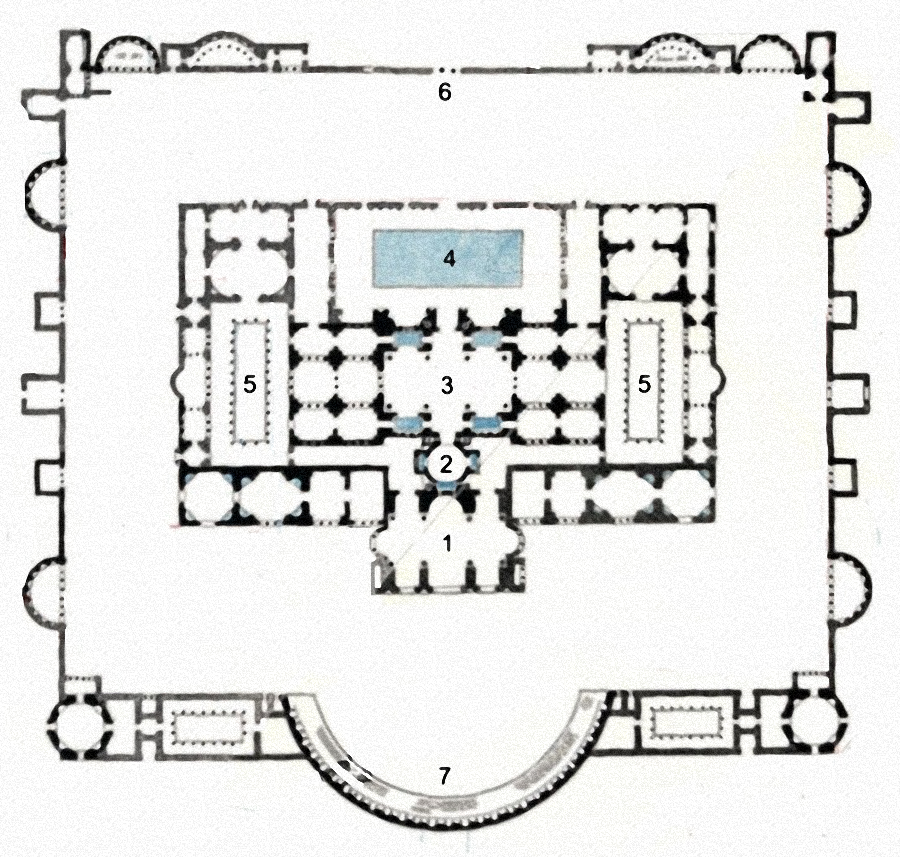
Reconstructed floorplan: (1) Caldarium, (2) Tepidarium, (3) Frigidarium, (4) Natatio, (5) Palaestra, (6) main entrance, (7) Exedra.

One of the four inscriptions around the main entrance to the Baths of Diocletian reads, translated from Latin, "Our Lords Diocletian and Maximian, the elder and invincible Augusti, fathers of the Emperors and Caesars, our lords Constantius and Maximian and Severus and Maximum, noblest Caesars, dedicated to their beloved Romans these auspicious Baths of Diocletian, which the divine Maximin on his return from Africa ordered to be built and consecrated in the name of his brother Diocletian, having purchased the premises required for so huge and remarkable work and furnishing them with the most sumptuous refinement." Although only fragments of the inscription are extant today, a complete transcription was made by an 8th- or 9th-century pilgrim and was preserved at Einsiedeln Abbey in Switzerland.

The enclosure of the bath complex took up 13 hectares (32 acres) of the district, about the same size as the Baths of Caracalla. The main entrance was to the northeast. To the southwest was a large exedra (now still visible as the outline of Piazza della Repubblica). The exedra was flanked by two large buildings, likely libraries. These in turn connected to circular halls: one of them is now the church of San Bernardo, the other is visible at the start of Via del Viminale. The central block of the baths was 280 (910 feet) by 160 meters (520 feet) or 10.85 acres (compared to the 6 acres of the Baths of Caracalla).

The central block consisted of frigidarium, tepidarium and caldarium along a single axis, with other halls arranged symmetrically around them. Flanking the frigidarium were two open-air gymnasiums (remains of the western one are accessible at Via Cernaia). Two octagonal halls flanked the caldarium.

Despite their similar size, the capacity of the Baths of Diocletian was said to be much greater than the Baths of Caracalla. This could be because the entrance and rooms were made larger than its predecessor in block size, which allowed more space and functionality. According to Olympiodorus, the baths were able to hold up to 3,000 people at one time. However, this claim is disputed because Olympiodorus never described how he calculated this figure.

=== The frigidarium ===
The word frigidarium originates from the Latin word frigeo, which means "to be cold". The prominence of the room and its conjoining rooms showed the increase in popularity cold baths had during the early 4th century compared to hot baths. This also could have been a result of the depletion of the surrounding forests, resulting in a lack of fuel. The frigidarium, or cella frigidaria consisted of a pool and a host of smaller baths connected to the main room. Water entering the room would come from a pipe or cistern and would exit through a drain within the pool. The water from the pool was thought to have been reused to flush latrines within the complex. The frigidarium was used mainly as a swimming pool or a cold-water bath, depending on the time. Normally, one would continue on to the frigidarium after using the hot-water baths or after exercising in the palaestra. Noting the massive size of the room, it was believed to have also been used as a social room. This idea is supported by the presence of statues and elaborate niches along the walls. On each end of the frigidarium are large shallow pools that were made to be open-air bathing pools. Today the room forms the colossal transept section of the Basilica of St. Mary.

=== The caldarium ===
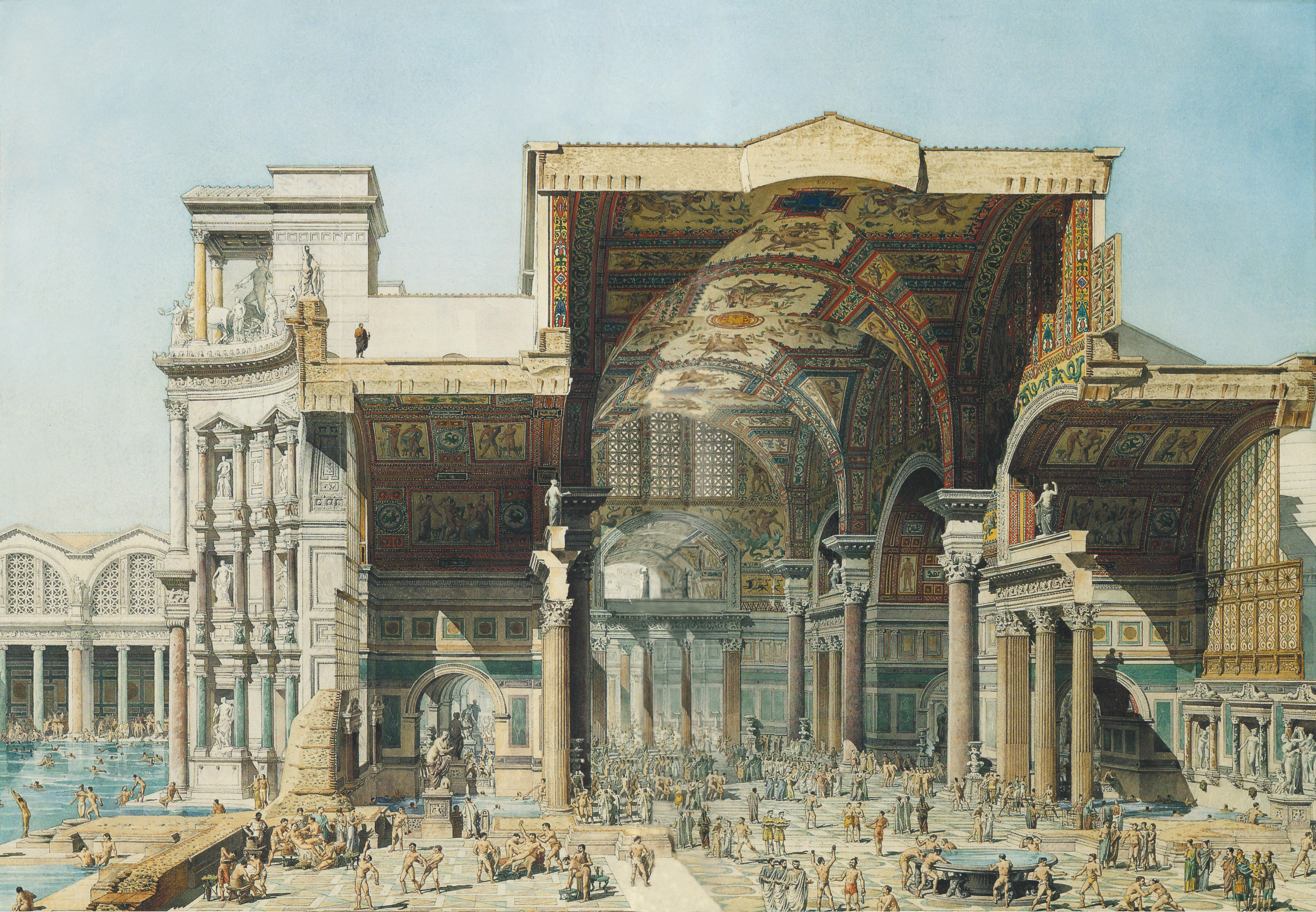
Cross-section of the Baths of Diocletian, rendering by French architect Edmond Paulin, 1880

The word caldarium comes from the Latin word caleo, meaning "to be hot". The purpose of the caldarium was that of the principal bath chamber within the baths. From its namesake, the room was used for a hot-water bath or for saunas or steam rooms. The room could have also been used for oiling before or after a bath, but, in most cases, this was moved to a separate room off of the caldarium.

The caldarium, or cella caldaria, was rectangular in shape with many octagonal rooms found near it in the corner of the structure. The area seemed to be referencing the older Baths of Nero and Titus in its initial design. What set this caldarium apart was the sheer scale of the room compared to its predecessors. It continued a basilica-like theme from the frigidarium with a cross-vaulted middle bay and three projecting apses. These architectural techniques created the feeling of a more open space for the patron. Dressing rooms, also known as apodyteria, were located on either side of the caldarium. Along the sides of the caldarium were private rooms that are believed to have had multiple functions, including private baths, poetry readings, rhetoricians, etc. Other areas attached to the caldarium were a garden, lounging rooms, gymnasiums, and small halls and semicircular exedrae used as lecture and reading rooms.

=== Presence of libraries ===
Rectangular halls connected to the hemicycle have been suggested to be libraries because of their similar set-up to those in the Baths of Caracalla. Historians, to support this theory, have demonstrated that these halls with their niches could properly house scrolls and/or codices. (The author of the Life of Probus mentions that part of the Bibliotheca Ulpia, was located in the Forum of Trajan, and part within the Baths of Trajan, although he later contradicts that statement when referring to the Bibliotheca Ulpia). The presence of similar spaces in the Baths of Caracalla and the Baths of Trajan therefore makes it not unreasonable to assume that the baths of Diocletian contained a library.

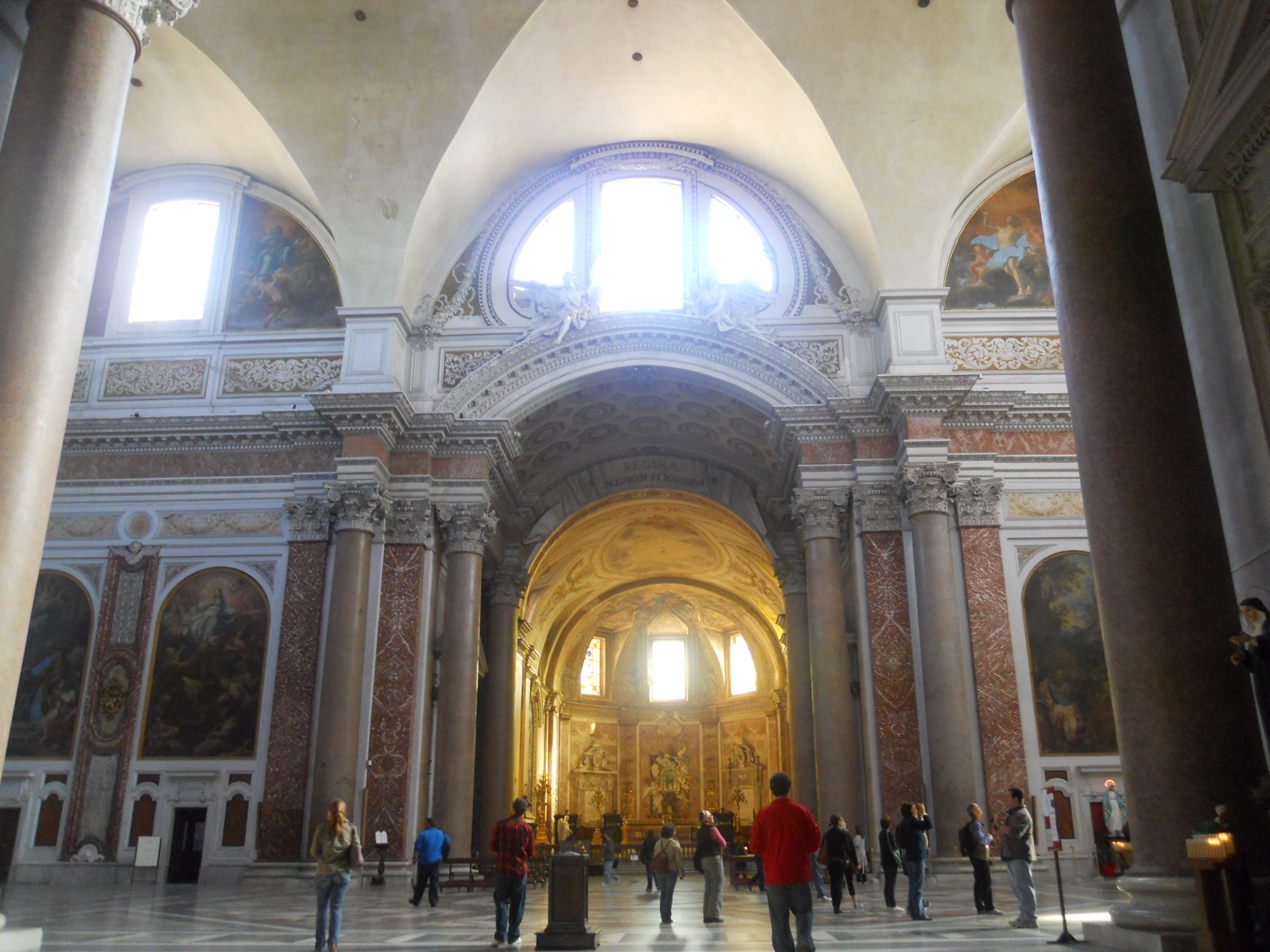
Santa Maria degli Angeli e dei Martiri, built in 16th century in the ruined frigidarium and tepidarium of the baths

=== Architectural styles ===
Within the frigidarium, the use of external buttresses for the cross vaults was considered by some to be the first example of the scientific system of thrusts and counter-thrusts in architecture. Concerning the baths as a whole, it has been described as evoking the Imperial style, or a "Classical" image, which is the style of "manipulation of space". To manipulate the space within this style, the forms of the building were simple and give the impression of a vast amount of open space. The builders of the baths used different techniques to create this effect. The exterior walls of the bath were encrusted with stucco to give the impression of stonework. This technique was quite common within the structures built during the Imperial style of Roman architecture, e.g., the baths of Constantine, the Basilica Nova, and parts of the Sessorian bridge. The interior parts of the bath were supported by vaulting ceilings and arches to create curvilinear lines. The structure of the roof is a typical example of Classical design. Architects used sloped forms to cover curved extrados (the outer surface of the arch) of the vaulted halls.

== Legacy ==
From the central structure were derived the plans for the Basilica of Constantine.

The Smithsonian's National Museum of Natural History building in Washington, D.C., was partially based on design elements from these baths, including its Diocletian windows.

== Present day ==
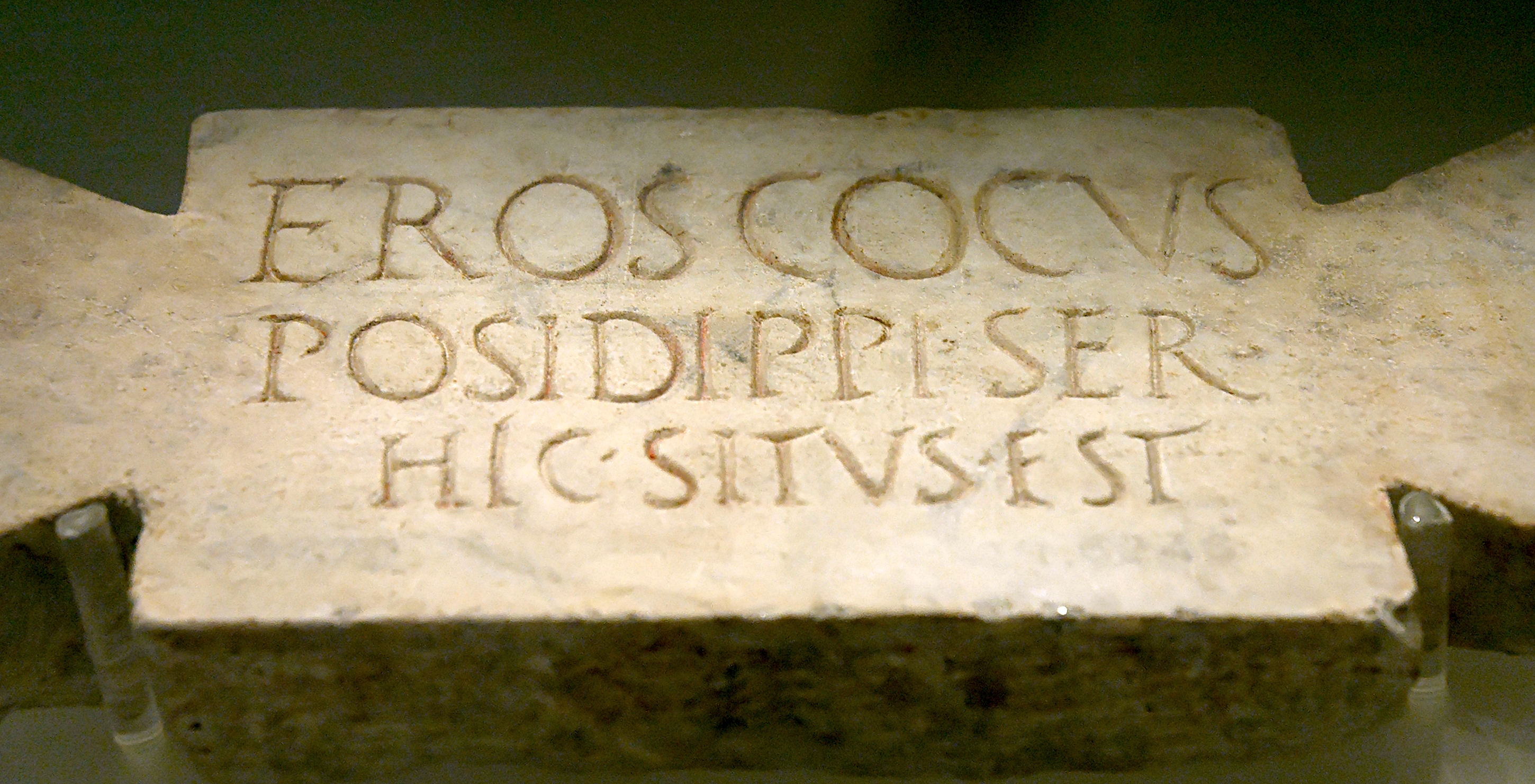
Funerary stele of a cook. Latin inscription: “Eros, cocus Posidippi, ser(vus) hic situs est” (“Eros, Posidippus' cook, slave, lies here”).

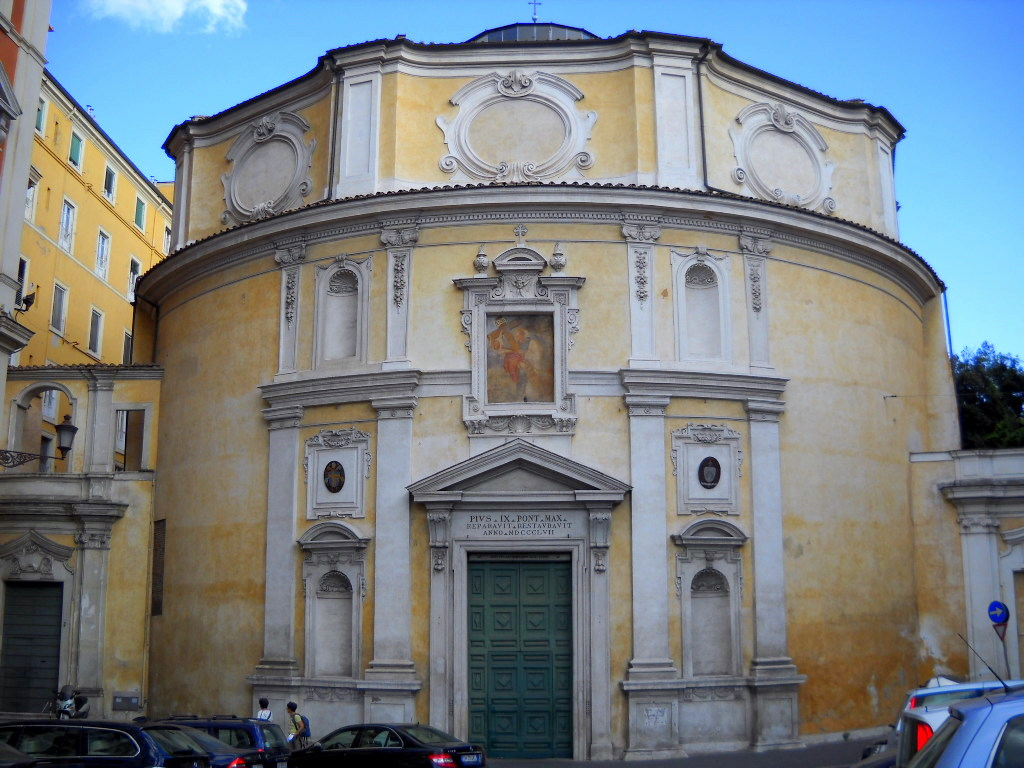
San Bernardo alle Terme built in 1598

Parts of the structure were converted to ecclesiastical or other use, including:

- Basilica of Santa Maria degli Angeli e dei Martiri
- Church of San Bernardo alle Terme
- Sections of the National Roman Museum

A part was, for many years, starting in the 1870s, the studio of the sculptor Moses Jacob Ezekiel. The "Octagonal hall" served as the planetarium of Rome from 1928 until 1983.

The museum is located in what is known as "Michelangelo's Cloister" and other buildings that were part of the Carthusian monastery as well as several halls south of the eastern palestra. The former main entrance hall of the museum connects the 16th-century outer garden around a large Krater used as a fountain with the cloister. The Epigraphic Museum is located in modern premises. The prehistoric exhibits are on the first floor of the cloister colonnade. The cloister itself exhibits numerous pieces of statuary.

Other remains of the baths are visible several streets away.

The church of San Bernardo alle Terme uses one of only two circular buildings in the rectangular enclosure of the baths, flanking its southwestern wall. Between these two structures, a large exedra used to exist as part of the same wall. This is now occupied by Piazza della Repubblica.

== See also ==
- Baths of Trajan – Ancient Roman baths in Rome, Italy
- Ancient Roman architecture
- Giovanni Battista Mercati for engravings from 1629
- List of Roman public baths

== Sources ==
- Platner, Samuel Ball, "Baths of Diocletian" 1929
- Dix, T. Keith (1994), "Public Libraries in Ancient Rome", Libraries & Culture, 29 (3), University of Texas Press: 282–296, JSTOR 25542662
- Brown, Frank E. (1954), "Roman Architecture", College Art Journal, 17 (2), College Art Association: 105–114, doi:10.2307/774050, JSTOR 774050, S2CID 255653759
- Yegul, Fikret (1992), Baths and Bathing in Classical Antiquity (First ed.), Cambridge, Massachusetts: MIT Press, ISBN 0-262-74018-4
- Coulston, Jon (2000), Ancient Rome:The Archaeology of the Eternal City, Oxford, England: Oxford School of Archaeology, ISBN 0-947816-54-2
- Nielsen, Inge (1990), Thermae et Balnea: The Architecture and Cultural History of Roman Public Baths (First ed.), Aarhus, Denmark: Aarhus university Press, ISBN 87-7288-512-2
- Richardson, Lawrence (1992), A New Topographical Dictionary of Ancient Rome (First ed.), Baltimore, Maryland: JHU Press, ISBN 0-8018-4300-6
- Lanciani, Rodolfo (1980), The Ruins and Excavations of Ancient Rome (First ed.), Outlet, ISBN 0-517-28945-8

| Preceded by Baths of Caracalla | Landmarks of Rome; Baths of Diocletian | Succeeded by Baths of Nero |
