= The Seven Halls =

Roman cisterns

Coordinates: 41.8934°N 12.4965°E

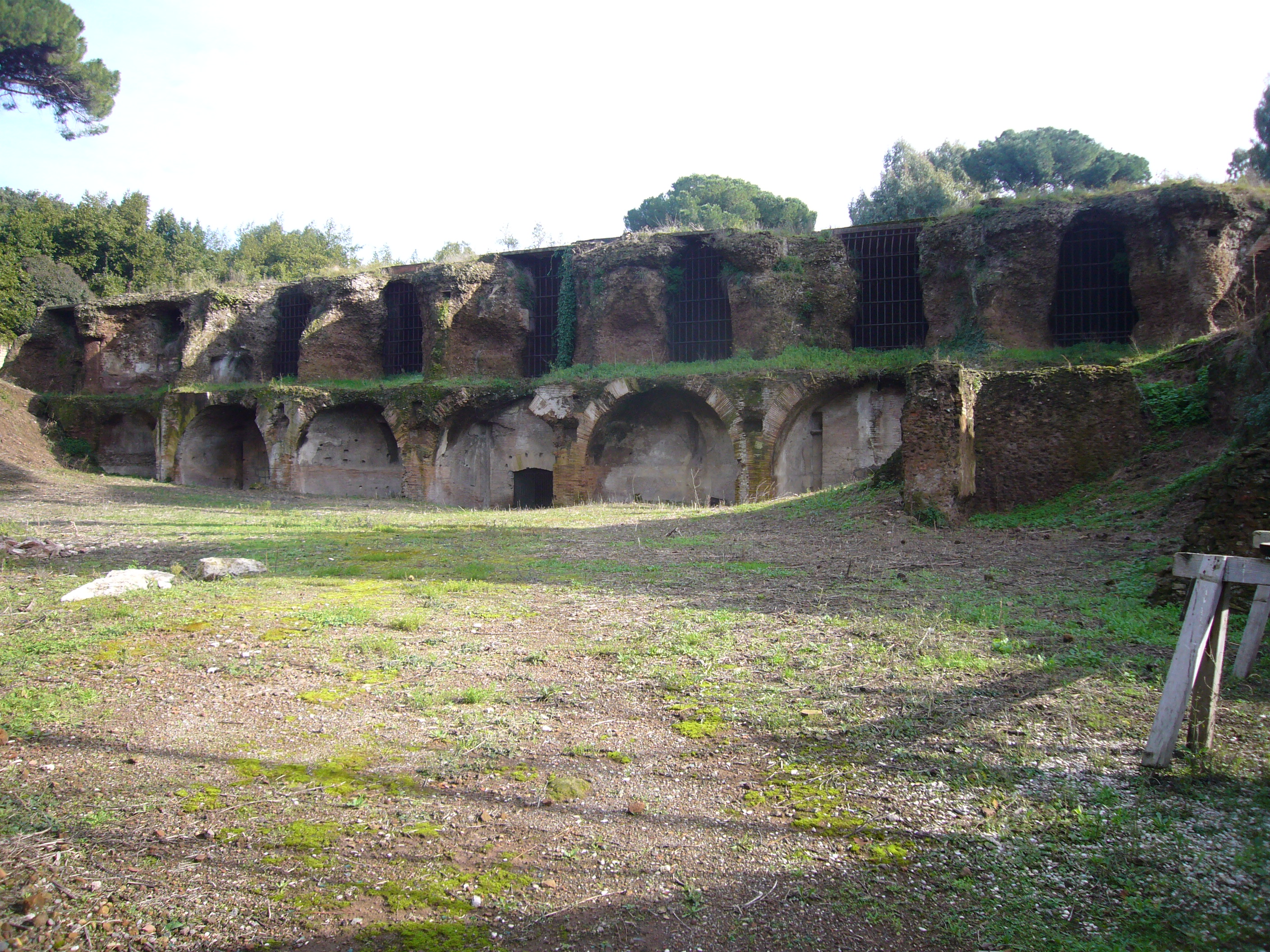
The Sette Sale

The Seven Halls, or Sette Sale, is the name of the complex of cisterns located on the Oppian Hill, Rome. The name comes from the fact that, when the complex was noted in the mid-eighteenth century, only seven chambers were recognised.

== Description ==
This large cistern holding over 8 million litres supplied the Baths of Trajan and was fed by a branch aqueduct that came from the Esquiline Hill.

Since it is oriented on the same axis as the nearby and differently than the Baths, it was once thought to have belonged to the Domus Aurea. However, the many brick stamps found in its wall prove that it was built at the same time as the Baths. It is on two levels, each consisting of nine (not seven) parallel compartments more than 5 m wide and 30 to 40 m long (differing because of the curve of the eastern perimeter wall). The lower level is a cryptoporticus supporting the true reservoir on the upper level which was high enough for water to flow out with enough pressure to supply the Baths. The compartments' walls and floors were lined with waterproof plaster.

The cistern was partially underground, with the back curved wall and the two side walls partially covered and buttressed by the embankment, while the impressive straight front wall with alternating rectangular and semicircular niches was visible. Large openings in the niches of the upper level provided ventilation. Water flowed out of pipes in the low-level niches into a large pipe a part of which has been found in front of the northeastern exedra of the Baths.

Also on the ground level of the complex were found the remains of a grotto lined with slabs of marble belonging to the Domus Aurea. In the fourth century a domus was built on top of the complex, likely from a building used to service the tank itself. In the Middle Ages, the northernmost chambers were used as catacombs and more than a thousand skeletons were discovered here during the 1967 excavations.

Located at the edge of the park, the cistern is well preserved (entrance on the Via delle Terme di Traiano).

== Bibliography ==
- ROMArcheologica. Guida alle antichità della città eterna, quinto itinerario, Elio de Rosa editore, Roma - ottobre 1999
- Romolo A. Staccioli, Acquedotti, fontane e terme di Roma antica, Newton & Compton Ed., Roma 2005
