= Velian Hill =

Landmark of ancient Rome

Coordinates: 41°53′28″N 12°29′21″E

- Hill of Rome
- Latin name: Velia, Veliae
- Italian name: Velia
- Rione: Campitelli
- Buildings: Arch of Titus, Sepulcretum, Domus Valeriorum
- Ancient Roman religion: Temple of the Penates

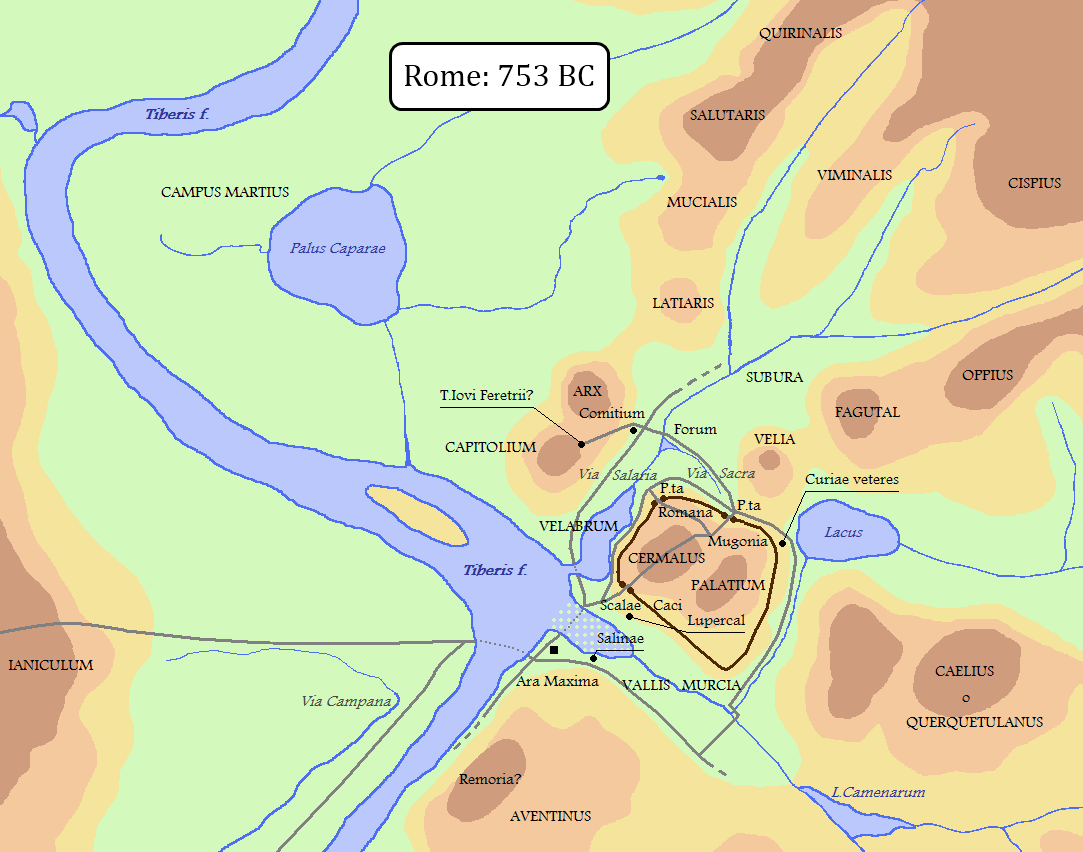
The location of the Velia is indicated on this speculative map of Rome circa 753 BC.

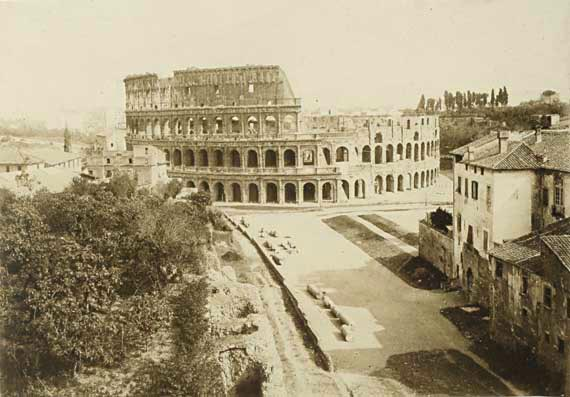
The Colosseum in 1880. On the left, the Velian Hill

The Velia — or Velian Hill or Velian Ridge — is a saddle or spur stretching out from the middle of the north side of the Palatine Hill towards the Oppian Hill (itself a spur of the Esquiline Hill) in Rome.

In later times, the Velia was called Summa Sacra Via ("Summit of the Sacra Via") — since that road began there at its highest point — and was marked by the Arch of Titus and Temple of Venus and Roma. (An alternate theory is that the Velia was actually the eastern half of the Palatine).

== Description ==
The Velian was reckoned as one of the seven hills on which the Septimontium was celebrated. The name appears more frequently in the singular, but also in the plural.

The hill is described by Dionysius of Halicarnassus as ὑψηλὸν ἐπιεικῶς καὶ περίτομον (high and steep). A primitive grave found in 1908 near the Arch of Titus lay at about 28 metres above sea-level, whereas virgin soil was found in the lowest part of the valley occupied by the Roman Forum at 3.6m, and in connection with the excavation of the Sepulcretum, at 10.63 metres. The original height of the ridge may have been somewhat diminished by the construction of the Domus Aurea.

The meaning and derivation of the Velia is as uncertain now as it was in antiquity. It is regularly mentioned in extant literature in connection with the Aedes Deorum Penatium (Temple of the Penates) and the Domus Valeriorum (House of the Valerii).

== See also ==
- Seven hills of Rome
- Aventine Hill (Aventino)
- Caelian Hill (Celio)
- Capitoline Hill (Capitolino)
- Cispian Hill (Cispio)
- Esquiline Hill (Esquilino)
- Janiculum Hill (Gianicolo)
- Monte Mario
- Monte Sacro
- Oppian Hill (Oppio)
- Palatine Hill (Palatino)
- Pincian Hill (Pincio)
- Quirinal Hill (Quirinale)
- Vatican Hill (Vaticano)
- Viminal Hill (Viminale)
