= Domus Valeriorum =

Domus Valeriorum (Latin: "House of the Valerii") refers to different ancient Roman properties on the Velian and Caelian hills occupied by members of the distinguished gens Valeria for nearly the entirety of the Republican and Imperial periods.

== Locations ==
There are three differing locations associated with a Domus Valeriorum located in ancient Rome. The first refers to a structure located on the Caelian hill on a site now occupied by a hospital (see "Caelian domus" below). The second refers to a domus located on the Palatine, while the third was a domus on the Velian. According to Platner and Ashby, the latter two likely refer to one same domus on the west slope of the Velia (see "Velian domus" below).

== Velian domus ==
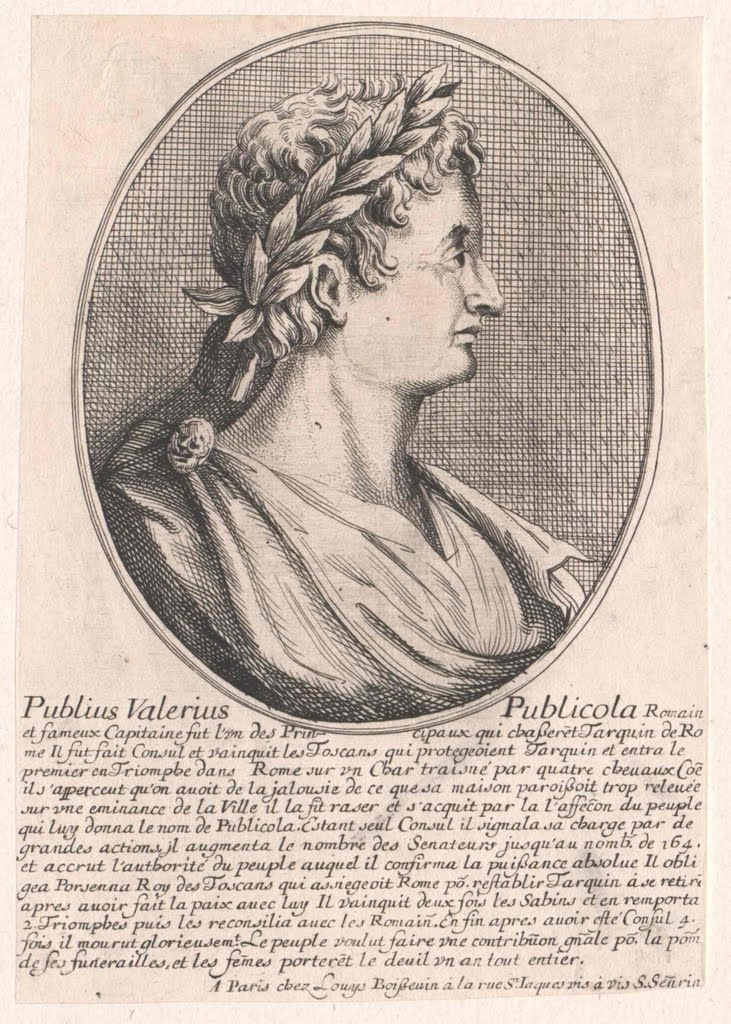
P. Valerius Poplicola's descendants, the Valerii Poplicolæ, successively owned both the Velian and Caelian domus.

The Domus Valeriorum located on the Velian hill was owned by Publius Valerius Poplicola, one of the four Roman aristocrats who led the overthrow of the Roman monarchy and a consul in 509 B.C. alongside Lucius Junius Brutus. He was eventually compelled to demolish the property and build a new one below the Velian as the original domus "seemed too much like a stronghold." Alternatively, Plutarch suggests that the demolition was voluntary. The site of the new Domus Valeriorium was eventually occupied by a Temple of Vica Pota (Victoria Possessor). It is alternatively attested that a domus below or on the Velia was given to P. Valerius as a "special honour." The sepulchre of P. Valerius is alleged to have been found on the Velian hill, while elogia fragments belonging to other members of the gens Valeria (Marcus Valerius Messala Niger and Marcus Valerius Messala Corvinus) have been found nearby behind the Basilica of Maxentius.

Another Domus Valeriorum is identified on the Palatine hill, one presented by the Roman state to Manius Valerius Maximus, dictator in 494 B.C. and brother to the aforementioned P. Valerius Poplicola. However, Platner and Ashby suggest this domus is in fact identical to the one attested on the Velia.

== Caelian domus ==
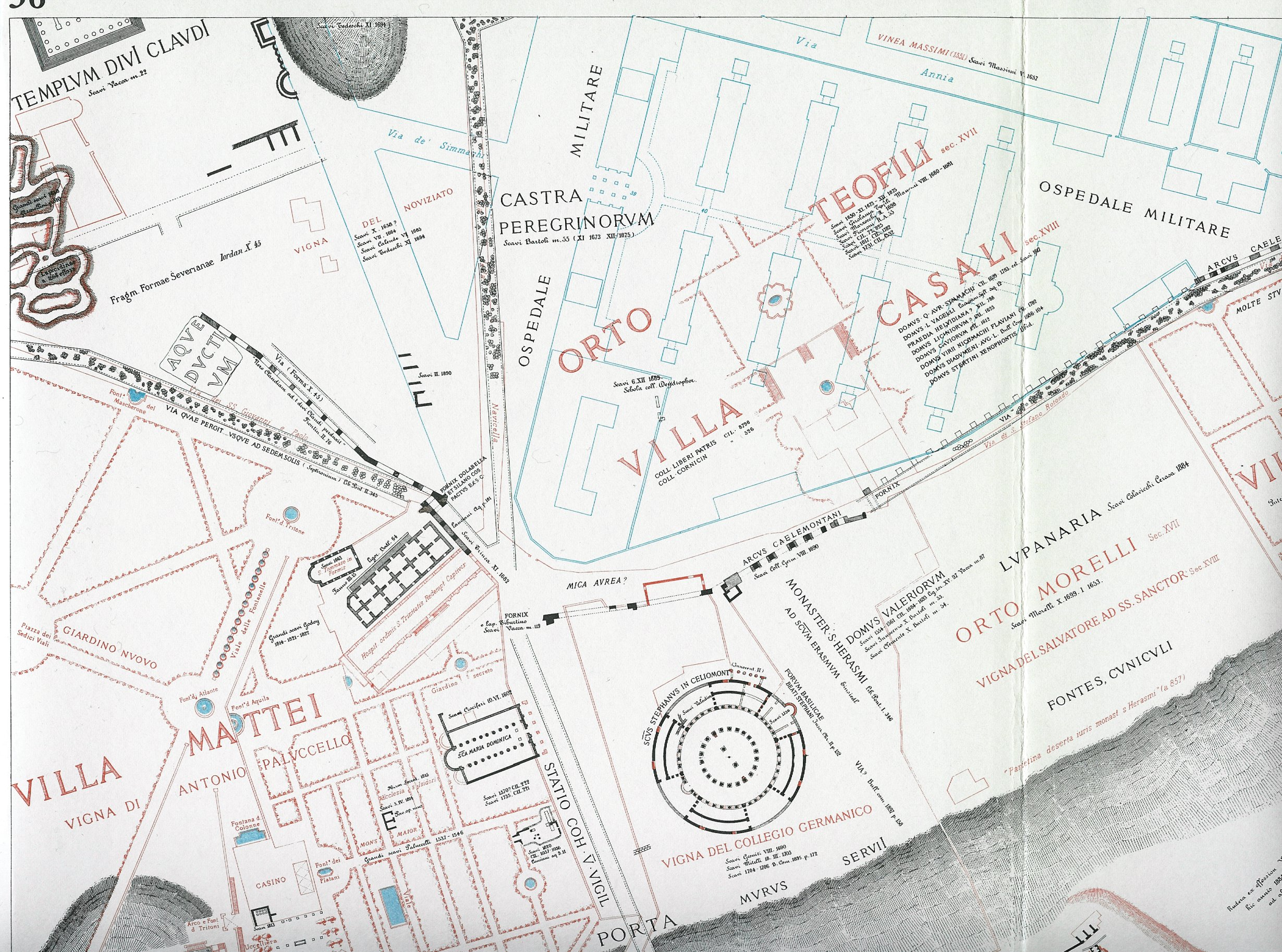
A plate from Rodolfo Lanciani's 1901 Forma Urbis map showing part of the Caelian hill. Both the "Domvs Valeriorvm" and "Monaster S. Herasmi" are placed slightly northeast of the Basilica of Santo Stefano Rotondo.

The earliest fresco and mosaic remnants of the Domus Valeriorum on the Caelian hill date to the original construction of the large domus, which lasted approximately between 50 and 30 B.C. The domus was owned by Valerii Poplicolæ, and was severely damaged by the fire of A.D. 27 during the reign of Tiberius and another fire in A.D. 64 under Nero. Two major building phases - the first in opus latericium and the second in opus vittatum - have been identified. The latter phase of construction focused on two areas, with the easternmost possessing thermal functions. The building likely extended towards the current Basilica of Santo Stefano Rotondo, with the gardens lying towards Via Sant'Erasmo. A significant portion of ruins, consisting of frescoes, stuccos, a mosaic-floored corridor and a viridarium, were uncovered in 2005 and dated to the 2nd century A.D.

The domus was consistently remodeled and renovated by successive generations of the Valerii until the late 4th century. According to the Melaniae Junioris Vita, Valerius Pinianus and Melania the Younger attempted and failed in A.D. 404 to sell the domus at a high asking price. The property was later severely damaged in A.D. 410 during Alaric's sack of Rome and was sold to the Church for almost nothing. Already in A.D. 575, the property housed an asylum for pilgrims and the elderly called the Xenodochium Valerii and the Monastery of Saint Erasmus. By the 7th century, however, the property was abandoned, and it was definitively destroyed in the 1084 sack of Rome by Robert Guiscard. Since the early 20th century, a hospital, the Ospedale San Giovanni Addolorata, occupies the former site of the domus.
