= Viminal Hill =

One of the seven hills of Rome, Italy

Coordinates: 41°53′57″N 12°29′39″E

- One of the seven hills of Rome
- Latin name: Collis Viminalis
- Italian name: Viminale
- Rione: Monti
- Buildings: Termini Station; Teatro dell'Opera; Palazzo del Viminale

Schematic map of Rome showing the seven hills and Servian Wall

The Viminal Hill (/ˈvɪmɪnəl/ VIM-in-əl; Latin: Collis Vīminālis [ˈkɔllɪs wiːmɪˈnaːlɪs]; Italian: Viminale [vimiˈnaːle]) is the smallest of the famous Seven Hills of Rome. A finger-shape cusp pointing toward central Rome between the Quirinal Hill to the northwest and the Esquiline Hill to the southeast, it is home to the Teatro dell'Opera and the Termini Railway Station.

At the top of the Viminal Hill is the Palace of Viminale that hosts the headquarters of the Ministry of the Interior; currently the term Il Viminale means the Ministry of the Interior.

According to Livy, the hill first became part of the city of Rome, along with the Quirinal Hill, during the reign of Servius Tullius, Rome's sixth king, in the 6th century BC. The name of the hill derives from Latin viminalis (“pertaining to osiers”), from vimen (“a pliant twig, osier”).

== See also ==
- Seven hills of Rome
- Aventine Hill (Aventino)
- Caelian Hill (Celio)
- Capitoline Hill (Capitolino)
- Cispian Hill (Cispio)
- Esquiline Hill (Esquilino)
- Janiculum Hill (Gianicolo)
- Monte Mario
- Oppian Hill (Oppio)
- Palatine Hill (Palatino)
- Pincian Hill (Pincio)
- Quirinal Hill (Quirinale)
- Vatican Hill (Vaticano)
- Velian Hill (Velia)
