= Seven hills of Rome =

Geographical heart of Rome, Italy, within the walls of the city

Schematic map of Rome showing the seven hills

The seven hills of Rome (Latin: Septem colles Romae or Septem montes Romae; Italian: Sette colli di Roma [ˈsɛtte ˈkɔlli di ˈroːma]) east of the river Tiber form the geographical heart of Rome, within the walls of the city.

== Hills ==
The seven hills are:

- Aventine Hill (Latin: Collis Aventinus; Italian: Aventino)
- Caelian Hill (Collis Caelius, originally the Mons Querquetulanus; Celio)
- Capitoline Hill (Mons Capitolinus; Campidoglio)
- Esquiline Hill (Collis Esquilinus; Esquilino)
- Palatine Hill (Collis or Mons Palatinus; Palatino)
- Quirinal Hill (Collis Quirinalis; Quirinale)
- Viminal Hill (Collis Viminalis; Viminale)

The Vatican Hill (Latin Collis Vaticanus) lying northwest of the Tiber, the Pincian Hill (Mons Pincius), lying to the north, the Janiculan Hill (Latin Janiculum), lying to the west, and the Sacred Mount (Latin Mons Sacer), lying to the northeast, are not counted among the traditional Seven Hills, being outside the boundaries of the most ancient part of Rome (as marked by the Servian Wall and the pomerium).

Separate also are the seven hills associated with the Septimontium, a proto-urban festival celebrated by the residents of the seven communities associated with the hills or peaks of Rome. These were the Oppius, Palatium, Velia, Fagutal, Cermalus, Caelius, and Cispius. These are sometimes confused with the traditional seven hills.

== History ==
Tradition holds that Romulus and Remus founded the original city on the Palatine Hill on 21 April 753 BC, and that the seven hills were first occupied by small settlements that were not grouped. The seven hills' denizens began to interact, which began to bond the groups. The city of Rome, thus, came into being as these separate settlements acted as a group, draining the marshy valleys between them and turning them into markets (fora in Latin). Later, in the early 4th century BC, the Servian Walls were constructed to protect the seven hills.

In modern Rome, five of the seven hills—the Aventine, Caelian, Esquiline, Quirinal, and Viminal Hills—are now the sites of monuments, buildings, and parks. The Capitoline Hill is the location of Rome's city hall, and the Palatine Hill is part of the main archaeological area.

A smaller area was covered by the seven peaks associated with the festival of the Septimontium: the Cispian Hill (Cispius Mons), Oppian Hill (Oppius Mons), and Fagutal Hill (Fagutalis Mons), three spurs of the Esquiline Hill, along with the Palatium and Cermalus, the peaks of the Palatine Hill, the Velian Hill, a ridge joining the Palatine and Oppian Hills, and the Caelian Hill.

=== Other cities with seven hills ===
Sheffield, Constantinople, Lisbon, Providence and the Massachusetts cities of Worcester, Somerville, and Newton are also said to have been built on seven hills, following the example of Rome.

== In the New Testament ==
In the Book of Revelation, the Whore of Babylon sits on "seven mountains", often understood by Christians as the seven hills of Rome and a reference to the pagan Roman Empire. Protestants later associated them with the Catholic Church (as the Pope is patriarch of Rome).

== See also ==
Other Roman hills

- Janiculan Hill (Gianicolo)
- Mons Sacer
- Monte Mario
- Monte Testaccio, an artificial hill composed primarily of broken amphorae
- Oppian Hill (Oppio)
- Pincian Hill
- Velian Hill (Velia)

General

- Seven hills
- Seven Mountains (Bergen)
