= Famulus =

Roman painter under Nero

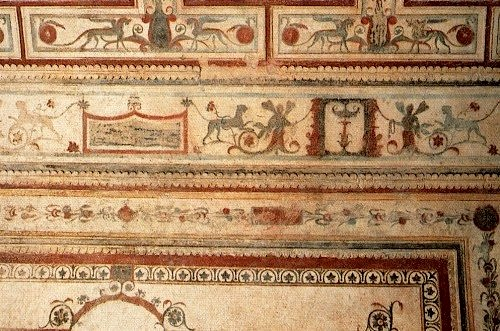
Fresco in the Domus Aurea of Rome

Famulus (possibly Fabulus, Fabullus, or Amulius) was a fresco painter famous for his work in the Domus Aurea, Rome, that was commissioned by Nero.

Because he was mentioned by Pliny the Elder, he is one of the earliest artists in Europe for which a contemporary biography survives.

== Biography ==
Famulus and assistants from his studio covered a large amount of the Domus Aurea wall with frescoes. Pliny, in his Natural History, recounts how Famulus went for only a few hours each day to the Golden House, to work while the light was right. Pliny the Elder presents him as one of the principal painters of the domus aurea:

More recently, lived Amulius, a grave and serious personage, but a painter in the florid style. By this artist there was a Minerva, which had the appearance of always looking at the spectators, from whatever point it was viewed. He only painted a few hours each day, and then with the greatest gravity, for he always kept the toga on, even when in the midst of his implements. The Golden Palace of Nero was the prison-house of this artist's productions, and hence it is that there are so few of them to be seen elsewhere."

The Domus Aurea frescoes' effect on Italian Renaissance painting was profound; it can be seen most obviously in Raphael's decoration for the Vatican loggias. The white walls, delicate swags, and bands of frieze — framed reserves containing figures or landscapes — have returned at intervals ever since, notably in late 18th century Neoclassicism, making Famulus one of the most influential painters in the history of art, although it is not clear how original he actually was.

Art historian Nunzio Giustozzi writes that Famulus painted in Style IV of the Pompeian Styles into which 1st-century Roman wall-painting is classified, impressionist-like coloring with deep blue, green, indigo, purple, and cinnabar red, including motion and animation in the artwork. Famulus is credited with large mythological scenes, now lost, much like the large panel Achilles at Skyros.

== In Fiction ==
- The Josephus Trilogy, historical novels by Lion Feuchtwagner about the career of Josephus Flavius:
  - Josephus (1932)
  - The Jew of Rome (1935)
  - Josephus and the Emporer (1942)
