= Baths of Trajan =

Ancient Roman baths in Rome, Italy

- Italian: Terme di Traiano
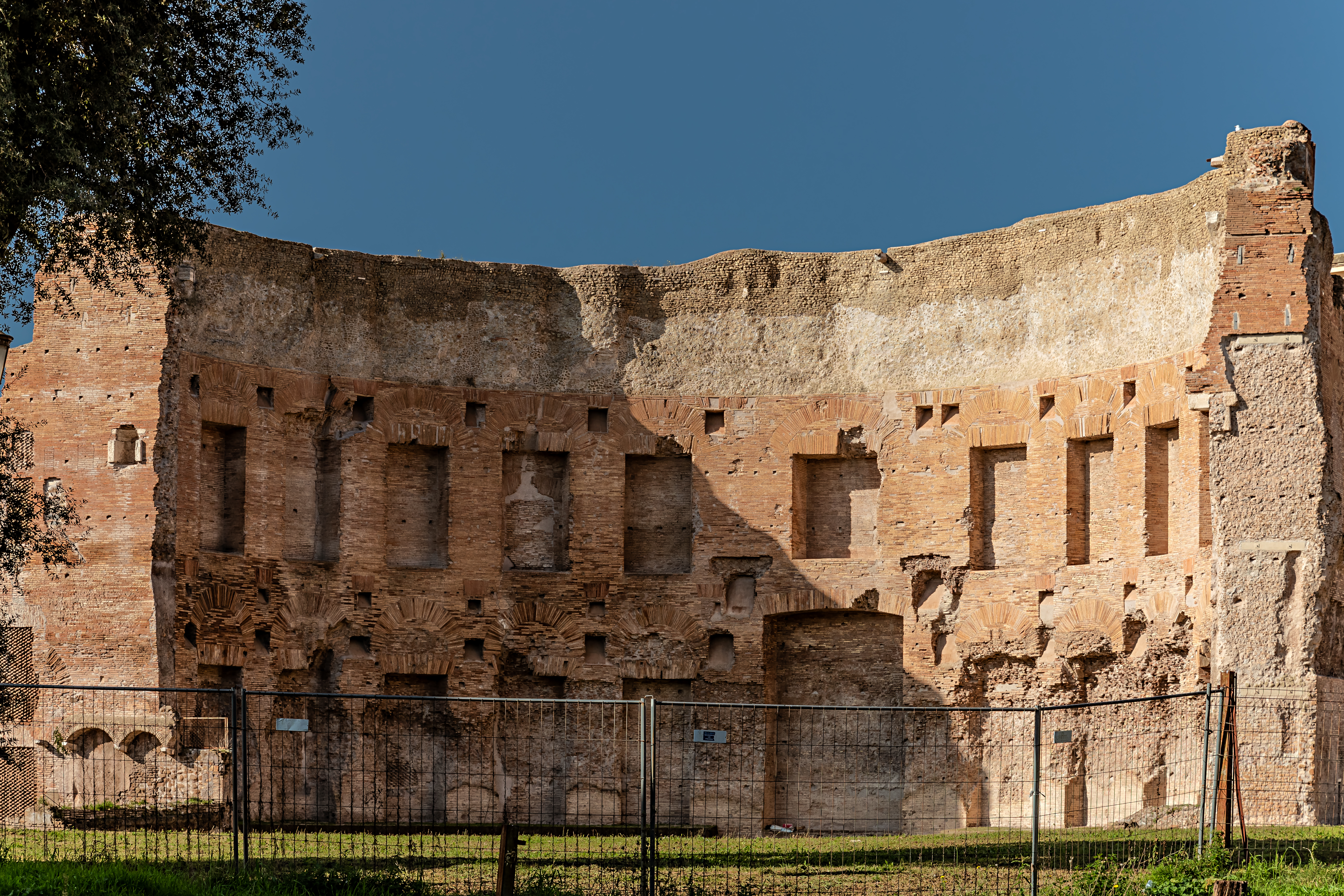
- The southwestern exedra of the Baths of Trajan once housed one of the two libraries (Greek and Latin).

- Shown within Augustan Rome
- Interactive map of Baths of Trajan
- 41°53′30.72″N 12°29′46.61″E
- Location: Rome, Italy

The Baths of Trajan (Italian: Terme di Traiano) were a massive thermae, a bathing and leisure complex, built in ancient Rome and dedicated under Trajan during the kalendae of July 109, shortly after the Aqua Traiana was dedicated.

== History ==
Commissioned by Emperor Domitian starting from around 96 AD, the complex of baths occupied space on the southern side of the Oppian Hill on the outskirts of what was then the main developed area of the city, although still inside the boundary of the Servian Wall. The architect of the complex is said to be Apollodorus of Damascus. Early Christian writers were thought to have misnamed the remains the "Baths of Domitian" but this was shown to be a correct attribution for the emperor who began the project, even if Trajan completed the work.

The baths were utilized mainly as a recreational and social center by Roman citizens, both men and women, as late as the early 5th century. The complex seems to have been deserted soon afterwards as a cemetery dated to the 5th century (which remained in use until the 7th century) has been found in front of the northeastern exedra.

The baths were thus no longer in use at the time of the siege of Rome by the Ostrogoths in 537; with the destruction of the Roman aqueducts, all thermae were abandoned, as was the whole of the now-waterless Mons Oppius.

== Location and site ==
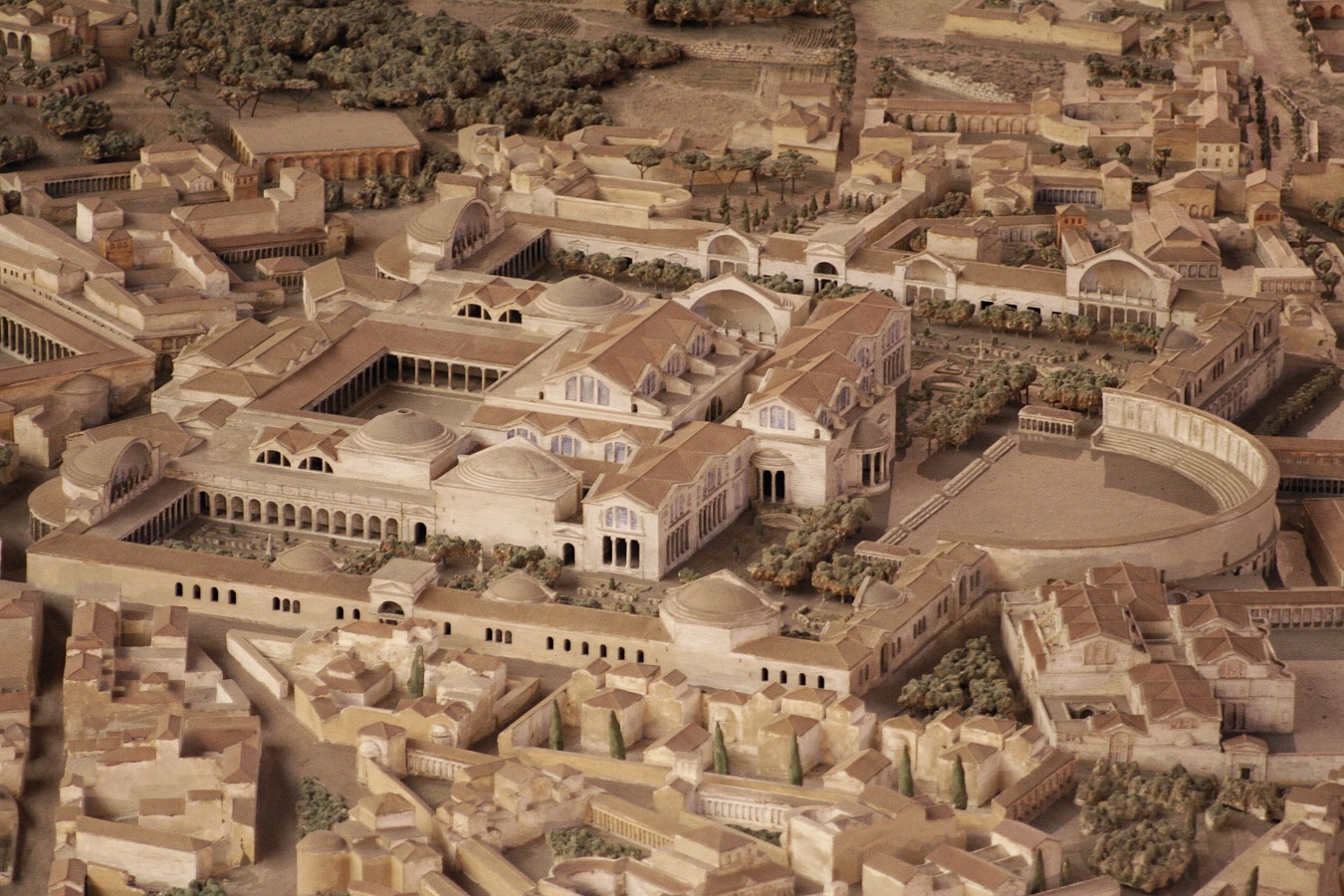
A modern reconstruction of the complex.

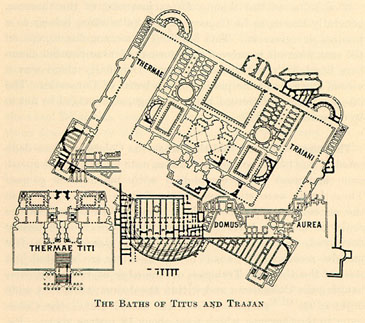
Plan of the Baths of Trajan, including those of Titus and the Domus Aurea

The baths were erected on the Oppian Hill, a southern extension of the Esquiline Hill. The lower slopes had been occupied by the Esquiline Wing of the Domus Aurea, an ornate residence belonging to Nero. After Nero's death, the residence on the Oppian remained in use by Emperors of the Flavian dynasty, until it was destroyed in a fire in 104 AD. The Domus Aurea was used as a cryptoporticus to level the ground and support a platform built over it upon which the Baths were built.

The complex rested on a northeast–southwest axis. This was off axis by about 30° with the Domus Aurea and the Baths of Titus, both of which rested along the meridian line on a north–south axis. It is suggested that this unorthodox orientation was chosen by the architects to reduce the bathers' exposure to the wind, while also maximising exposure to the sun.

== Description ==
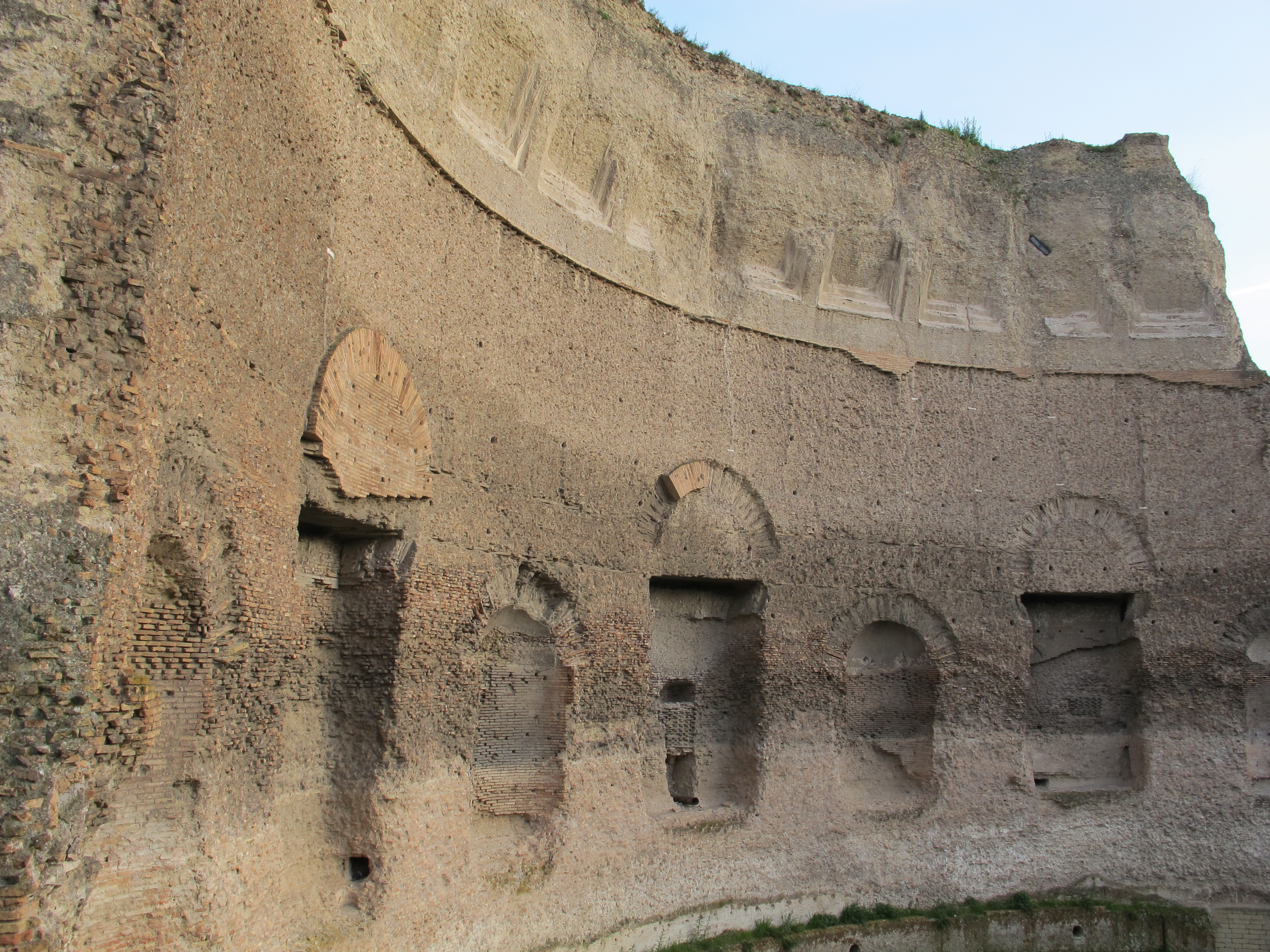
East exedra with partially intact coffers.

The bath complex was immense by ancient Roman standards, covering an area of approximately 330 by 340 metres.

The baths including the open area (which surrounded it on three sides) were enclosed by a perimeter wall, which joined with the bath block on the northeast side, where the main entrance was located. A huge apse projected out from the southwestern side of the platform, lined with seating, suggesting the area was used for athletic contests and performances. There were two smaller apses set within the corners of the northeast perimeter wall, flanking the bath block. These are thought to have contained monumental fountains. There were also exedrae in the southwest and northwest corners of the enclosure wall, which may have housed libraries. The exedra in the southwest corner, with its two stories of niches, still survives.

The plan of the baths broadly followed the prototype laid out in the neighbouring Baths of Titus, constructed 29 years earlier, and would be replicated in the great Imperial baths of the 3rd and 4th centuries AD. The Baths of Titus, however, covered an area less than a third the size of those of Trajan. The main chambers were arranged in a sequence along a central axis from northeast to southwest (natatio–frigidarium–tepidarium–caldarium), and were flanked on either side by a network of rooms and open courts which were strictly symmetrical with one another. The visitor would have entered through a vestibule on the northeast side, and proceeded straight to the natatio, a large open-air swimming pool surrounded by colonnades on all four sides. Next came either one of the identical flanking wings, where there was a rotunda each (possibly frigidaria) followed by rectangular palaestrae, open courts used for wrestling and athletic exercises.

After proceeding through the side rooms, the true baths began with the caldarium (hot room) on the southwest side of the building. This rectangular room had an apse in each wall and projected forward from the main block to best absorb the hot afternoon sun. The rooms which flanked it on either side contained lesser hot rooms. Then came a small tepidarium (warm room), acting as a buffer between the larger cold and hot rooms. The largest chamber of all came next, the frigidarium (cold room). This functioned as the central hall of the entire building, where two different axes of rooms and open courts intersected. It was roofed by three cross vaults supported on eight huge columns arranged along the walls. In its four corners were cold plunge baths. The bather would have completed the experience back where they began, with another swim in the natatio.

In addition to the facilities of the bath complex used by the public, there was a system of subterranean passageways and structures used by slaves and workers to service and maintain the facilities. Also underground, the massive cistern, surviving today as The Seven Halls stored much of the water used in the baths, up to 8 million litres. The water may have been supplied by the Aqua Traiana but, since it is unlikely to have crossed the Tiber, more likely by freed water from other aqueducts after the Traiana was built.

== Later history ==
Although they were correctly known as the Thermae Traiani throughout the Middle Ages and much of the Renaissance, in the late sixteenth century the ruins of the Baths of Trajan were confused with the nearby Baths of Titus and became known as the Thermae Titiani. Doubt arose as to whether the Baths of Trajan had ever existed at all as an independent structure. Supporters of this theory argued that only the Baths of Titus stood on the Oppian, with the name of Trajan applied to them later because he undertook a restoration. Only in the late 19th century did the archaeologist Rodolfo Lanciani untangle the separate identities of the baths, establishing the Baths of Trajan as a much larger structure separate from the Baths of Titus. Several fragments of the Forma Urbis depict the plan of the Baths, one of which preserves three letters ("AIA") from the inscription identifying the complex as the "THERMAE TRAIANI".

The Baths were slowly dismantled over the centuries, as the marble and brick were sold by the monks of San Pietro in Vincoli to stonemasons for re-use and burning into lime for mortar. Large parts still remained standing at the beginning of the sixteenth century, when architects like Andrea Palladio studied the ruins and were able to reconstruct the floorplan. Many works of art were unearthed in the vicinity of the Baths during the Renaissance, including the famous statuary group of Laocoön and His Sons, which was discovered in a hall underneath a vineyard in 1506, near the Seven Halls. The main building to which this hall belonged, presumably in the garden, is uncertain, but the Domus Aurea and the Baths of Trajan are both possibilities.

== "City fresco" and mosaics ==
The archaeological excavations of 1997 also led to the discovery of a large (about 10 m^{2}) frescoed bird's-eye view of a walled port city, a unique survivor of such a subject, in a buried gallery or cryptoporticus beneath the baths, which pre-dated their construction, but postdated Nero's Domus Aurea. Whether it represents the reorganization of an actual port or an idealized one remains an open question.

Additionally, the discovery of a 16 m mosaic was announced in July 2011 in what is believed to be a Musaeum, a place dedicated to the goddesses who inspire the creation of the arts, featuring a nymphaeum (fountain room), which was buried to build the baths above. Part of the tesserae are missing, having been stripped by Trajan's workers and re-used in the new construction. Components of the mosaic identified to date include:

- Apollo, the Greek god of music, poetry, prophecy, light, and healing, and "Leader of the Muses"
- capitals and columns decorated with garland plants
- several muses.

Also discovered nearby, another mosaic shows grape harvesting scenes.

== See also ==
- Baths of Agrippa – Ancient Roman bath, a landmark of Rome, Italy

General overview

- Ancient Roman architecture
- Roman aqueducts
- Roman architecture
- Roman engineering

Other baths

- List of Roman public baths

Engineers

- Frontinus
- Vitruvius

Other

- List of Roman domes (half-domes)
- Ancient Roman and Byzantine domes

== Sources ==
- Anderson, James C. Jr. (1985). "The Date of the Thermae Traiani and the Topography of the Oppius Mons". American Journal of Archaeology. 89 (3). Archaeological Institute of America: 499–509. doi:10.2307/504364. JSTOR 504364. S2CID 193009496.
- Platner, S.B. (1911). The Topography and Monuments of Ancient Rome (2nd ed.). Boston, Allyn and Bacon. p. 454.
- Gates, Charles (2003). Ancient Cities: The Archaeology of Urban Life in the Ancient Near East and Egypt, Greece, and Rome. Routledge. p. 378.
- Richardson, Lawrence (1992). A New Topographical Dictionary of Ancient Rome. The Johns Hopkins University Press.

Preceded by Baths of Nero	Landmarks of Rome; Baths of Trajan	Succeeded by Ara Pacis
