= Domus Aurea =

Roman palace

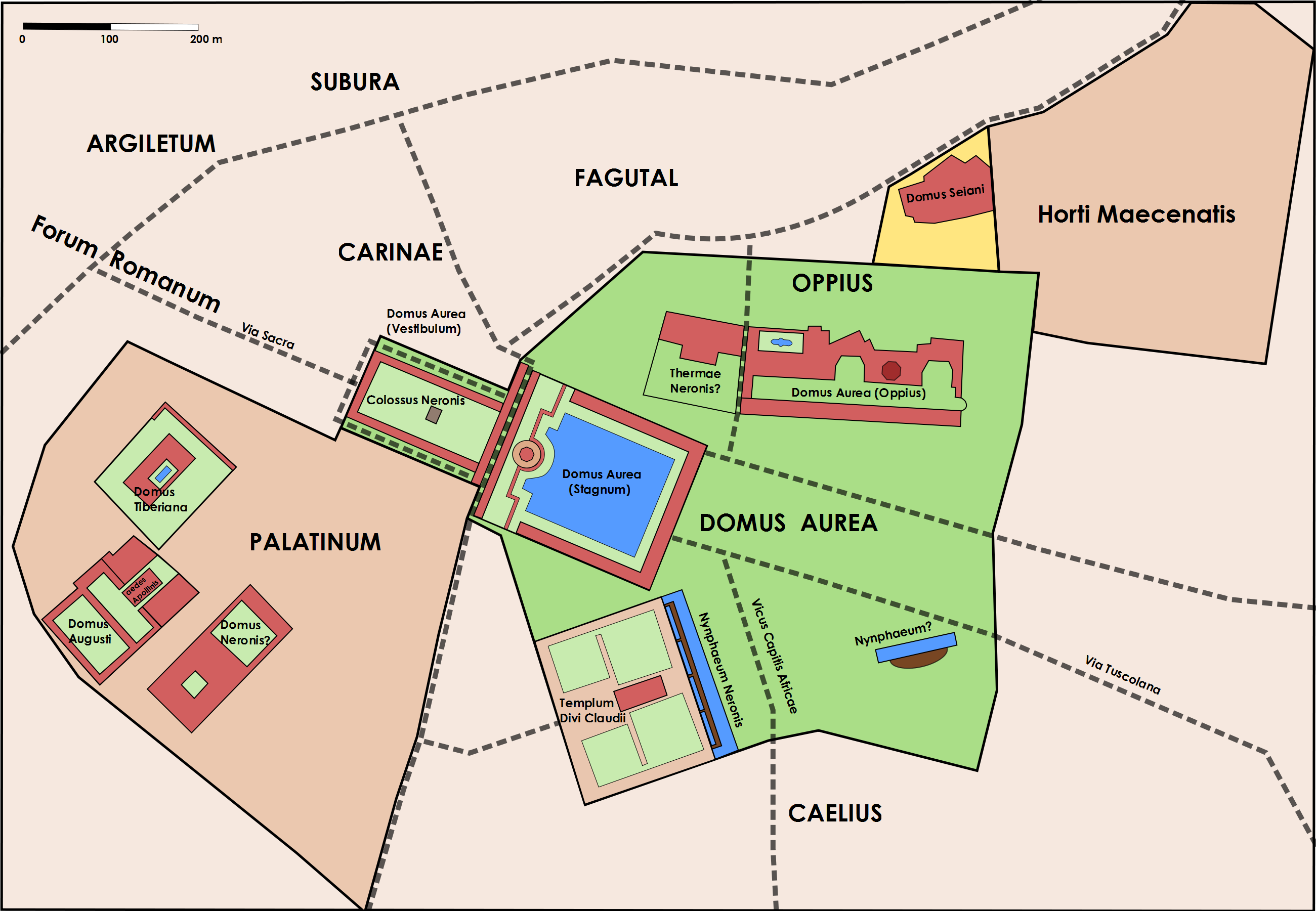
- Overall plan of Domus Aurea

- Shown within Augustan Rome
- Click on the map for a fullscreen view
- 41°53′29″N 12°29′43″E
- Type: Roman villa
- Location: Regione III Isis et Serapis

History
- Built: c. 64–68 AD
- Built by: Nero Claudius Caesar Augustus Germanicus

The Domus Aurea (Latin, "Golden House") was a vast landscaped complex built by the Emperor Nero largely on the Oppian Hill in the heart of ancient Rome after the great fire in 64 AD had destroyed a large part of the city.

It replaced and extended his Domus Transitoria that he had built as his first palace complex on the site.

== History ==
Construction began after the great fire of 64 and was nearly completed before Nero's death in 68, a remarkably short time for such an enormous project. Nero took great interest in every detail of the project, according to Tacitus, and oversaw the engineer-architects, Celer and Severus, who were also responsible for the attempted navigable canal with which Nero hoped to link Misenum with Lake Avernus.

Emperor Otho and possibly Titus allotted money to finish at least the structure on the Oppian Hill; this continued to be inhabited, notably by emperor Vitellius in 69 but only after falling ill, until it was destroyed in a fire under Trajan in 104.

A symbol of decadence that caused severe embarrassment to Nero's successors, the Domus Aurea was stripped of its marble, jewels, and ivory within a decade. Although the Oppian villa continued to be inhabited for some years, soon after Nero's death other parts of the palace and grounds, encompassing 2.6 square kilometres (1 sq mi), were filled with earth and built over: the Baths of Titus were already being built on part of the site, probably the private baths, in 79 AD. On the site of the lake, in the middle of the palace grounds, Vespasian built the Flavian Amphitheatre, which could be flooded at will, with the Colossus of Nero beside it. The Baths of Trajan, and the Temple of Venus and Roma were also built on the site. Within 40 years, the palace was obliterated. Paradoxically, this ensured the wall paintings' survival by protecting them from moisture.

=== Rediscovery ===
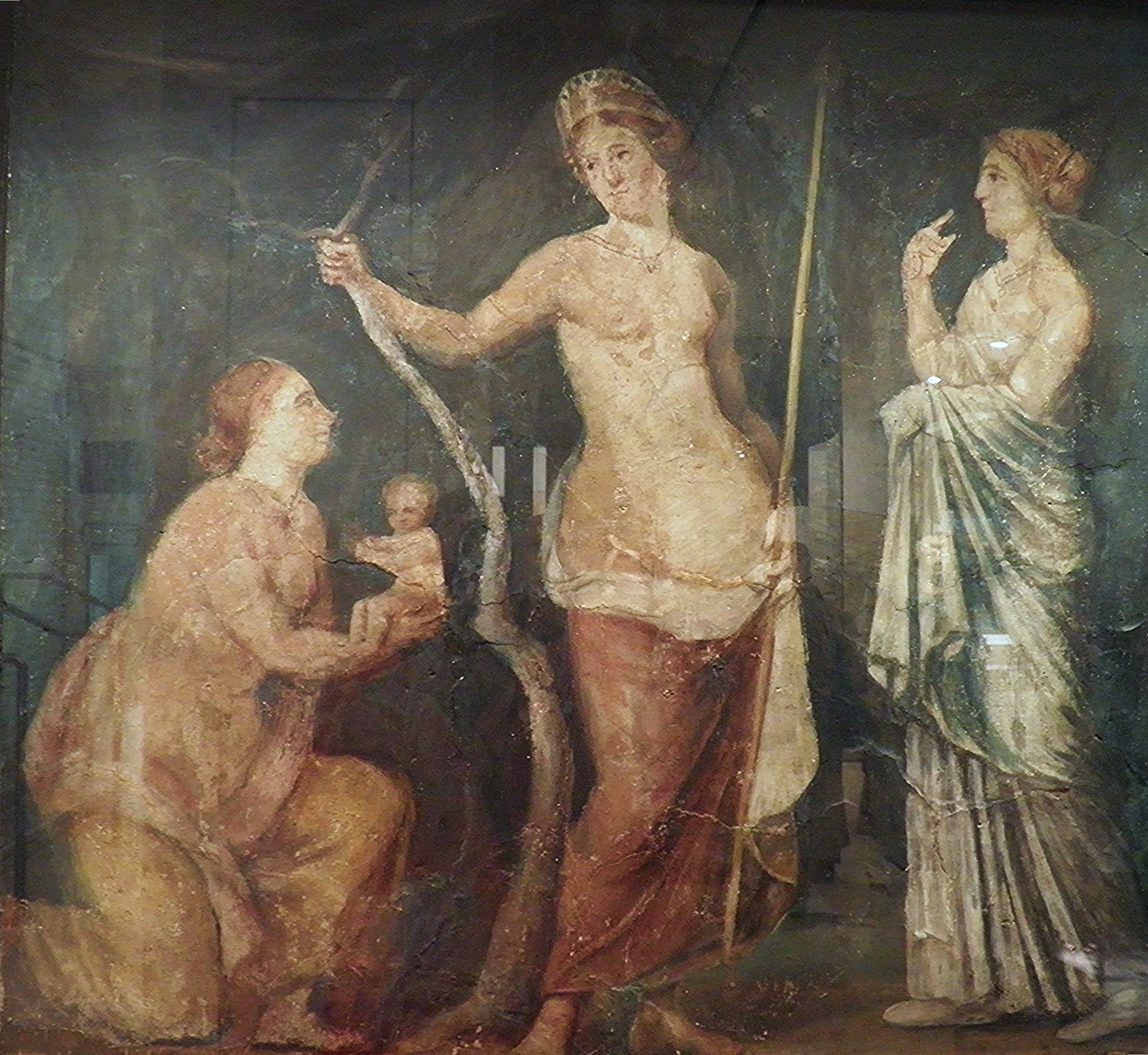
Fresco from the Golden House of Nero, removed in 1668. The painting has considerable over-painting and is not in its original state.

When a young Roman inadvertently fell through a cleft in the Esquiline hillside at the end of the 15th century, he found himself in a strange cave or grotto filled with painted figures. Soon the young artists of Rome were having themselves let down on boards knotted to ropes to see for themselves. The Fourth Style frescoes that were uncovered then have faded now, but the effect of these freshly rediscovered grotesque decorations (Italian: grotteschi) was electrifying in the early Renaissance, which was just arriving in Rome.

When Raphael and Michelangelo crawled underground and were let down shafts to study them, the paintings were a revelation of the true world of antiquity. Beside the graffiti signatures of later tourists like Casanova and the Marquis de Sade scratched into a fresco inches apart, are the autographs of Domenico Ghirlandaio, Martin van Heemskerck, and Filippino Lippi.

Four of the frescos were removed in 1668; the only known surviving fresco of these is currently in the possession of the Ashmolean Museum (not currently on display).

The frescoes' effect on Renaissance artists was instant and profound (it can be seen most obviously in Raphael's decoration for the loggias in the Vatican), and the white walls, delicate swags, and bands of frieze—framed reserves containing figures or landscapes—have returned at intervals ever since, notably in late 18th century Neoclassicism, making Famulus one of the most influential painters in the history of art.

=== 20th century to present ===
Discovery of the pavilion led to the arrival of moisture starting the slow, inevitable process of decay; humidity sometimes reaches 90% inside the Domus. Heavy rain was blamed for the collapse of a chunk of ceiling. The presence of trees in the park above was causing further damage.

The weight of earth on the Domus was also causing a problem. Increasing concerns about the condition of the building resulted in its closing at the end of 2005 for further restoration work. The complex was partially reopened in 2007, but closed in 2008 because of safety concerns.

On March 30, 2010, 60 square metres (650 square feet) of the vault of a gallery collapsed.

The modern archaeological site contains over 150 rooms with about one third of these rooms being open to the public.

The Domus reopened in 2014.

== Construction ==
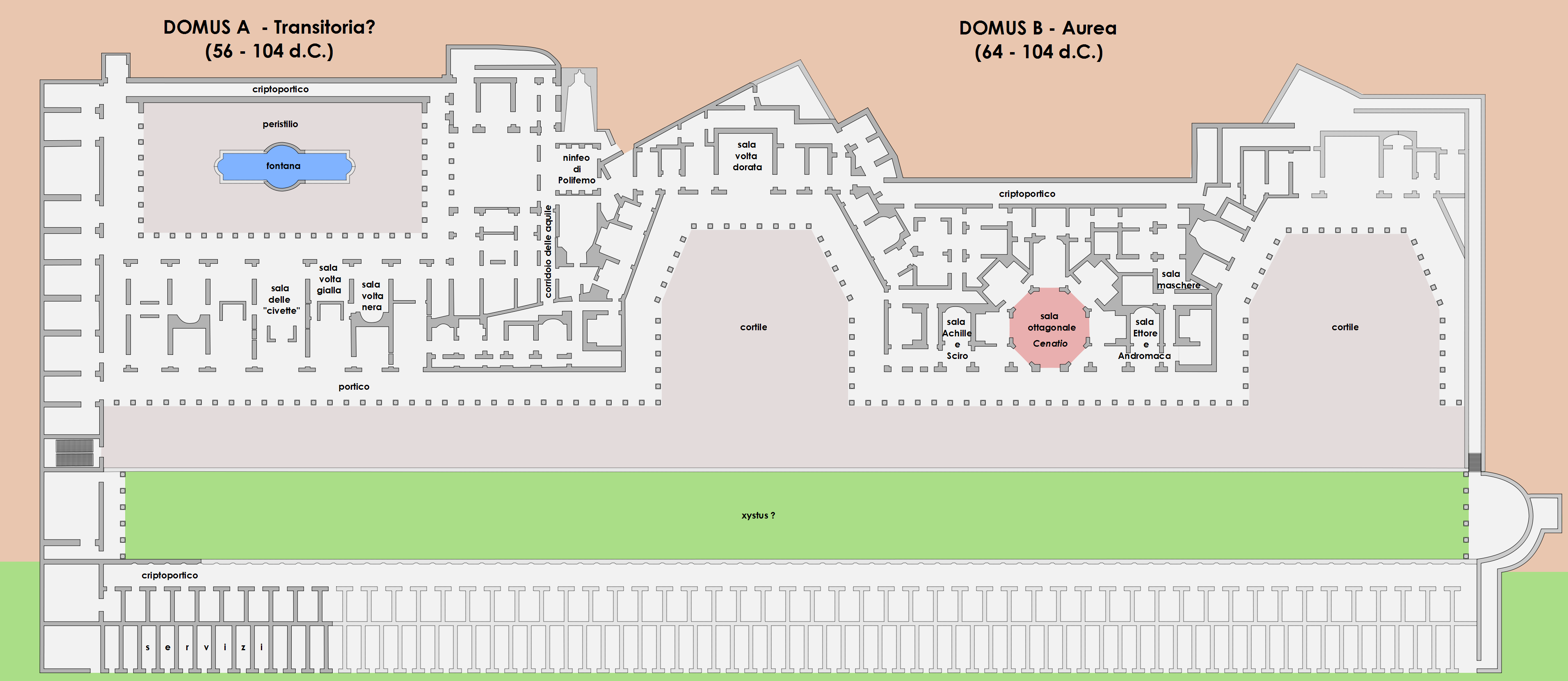
Plan of Pavilion on the Oppian

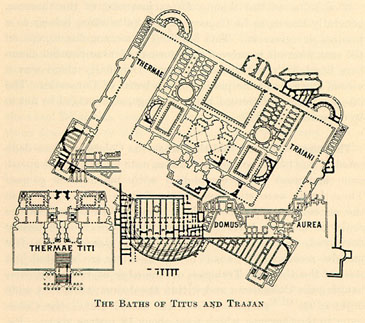
Overlay of Trajan's baths on the Oppian Hill

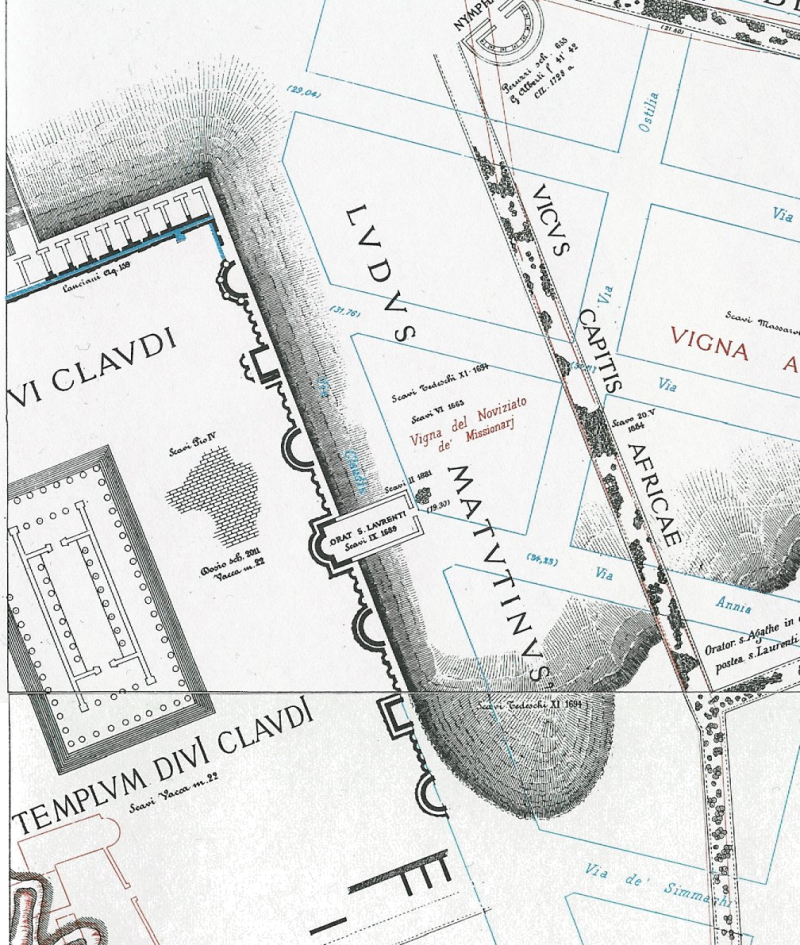
Nero's Nymphaeum on the east side of the Temple of Claudius, plan by Lanciani

Suetonius claims this of Nero and the Domus Aurea:

When the edifice was finished in this style and he dedicated it, he deigned to say nothing more in the way of approval than that he had at last begun to live like a human being.

The Domus Aurea complex covered parts of the slopes of the Palatine, Oppian, and Caelian hills, with an artificial lake in the marshy valley. The area of the estate can only be approximated, as much of it has not been excavated. Some scholars place it at more than 300 acres (1.2 km^{2}), while others estimate its size to have been less than 100 acres (0.40 km^{2}). Suetonius describes the complex as "ruinously prodigal" as it included groves of trees, pastures with flocks, vineyards, and an artificial lake—rus in urbe, "countryside in the city". Nero's main residence remained the imperial palaces of the Palatine, while the pavilion on the Oppian was used when he preferred to remain in the horti, and the buildings with vestibulum and stagnum were used for feasts, where he received the people of Rome.

To supply his lake in the valley between the Palatine, Oppian, and Caelian, Nero diverted water from the Aqua Claudia by a specially built branch aqueduct known as the Arcus Neroniani. This extended 2 km west from the Claudia to the southern side of the Caelian Hill.

He also built a nymphaeum on the eastern side of the Caelian, visible across the valley from the pavilion, and against the eastern wall of the unfinished Temple of Claudius. The nymphaeum was made up of tiered columns and semicircular and rectangular niches; it would have contained a large sculptural group at the centre. Archaeological excavations confirm that the water cascaded from the top of the nymphaeum down into 4 basins. The aqueduct fed the nymphaeum and ultimately the lake.

Nero also commissioned from the Greek Zenodorus a colossal 35.5 m (120 RF) high bronze statue of him, the Colossus Neronis. Pliny the Elder, however, puts its height at only 30.3 m (106.5 RF). The statue was placed just outside the main palace entrance at the terminus of the Via Appia in a large atrium of porticoes that divided the city from the private villa. This statue may have represented Nero as the sun god Sol, as Pliny saw some resemblance. This idea is widely accepted among scholars, but some are convinced that Nero was not identified with Sol while he was alive. The face of the statue was modified shortly after Nero's death during Vespasian’s reign to make it truly a statue of Sol. Hadrian moved it, with the help of the architect Decrianus and 24 elephants, to a position next to the Flavian Amphitheater. This building took the name "Colosseum" in the Middle Ages, after the statue nearby, or, as some historians believe, because of the sheer size of the building.

=== Palace on the Palatine ===
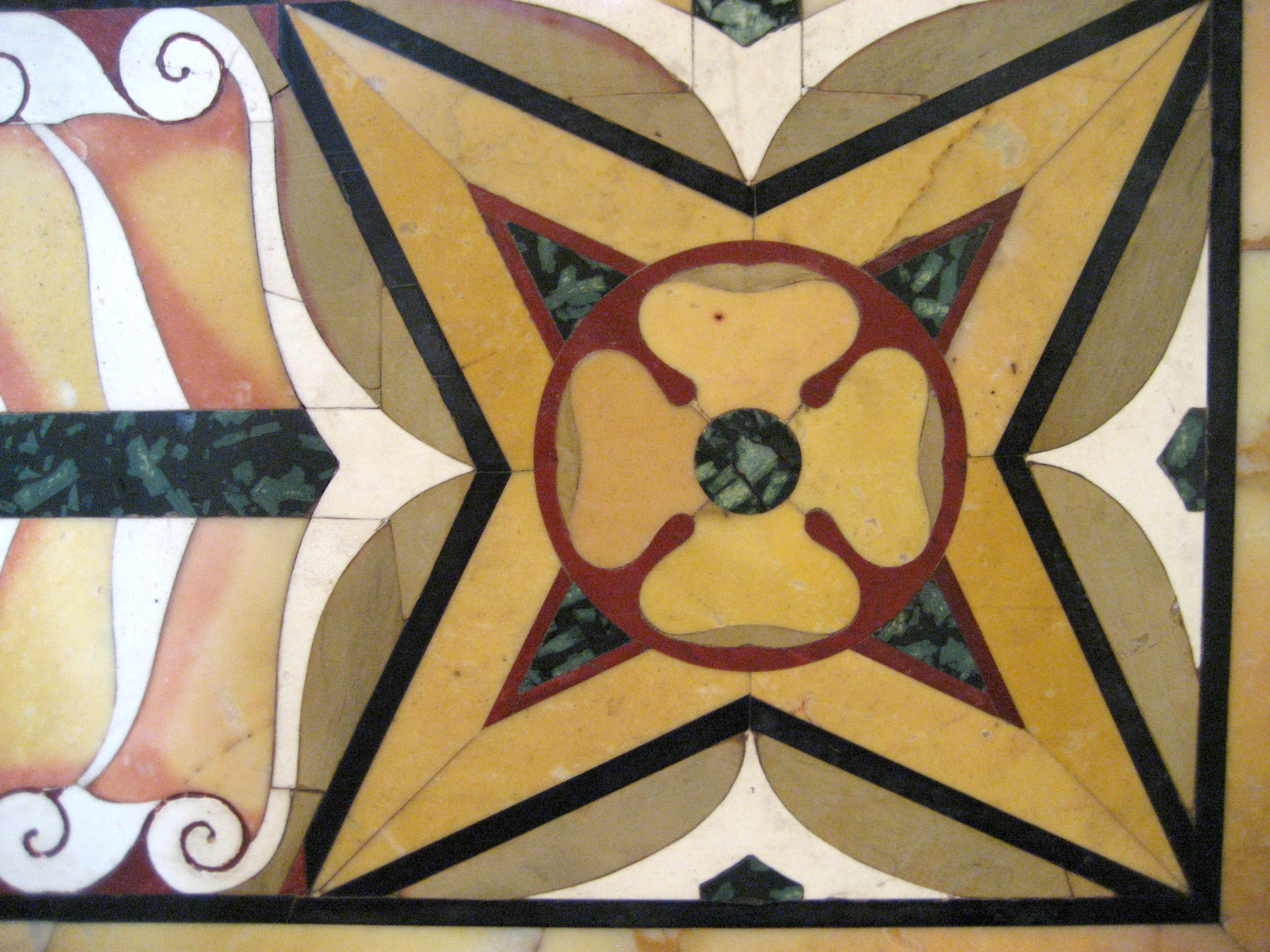
Opus sectile from the Domus Aurea

The main part of the palace was probably on the Palatine Hill and a large and brilliantly decorated set of rooms has been located in the central part of the hill under the Palace of Domitian. This site was excavated in 1721 when considerable damage was done during the excavations. The lower floors contained sunken gardens, two pavilions and an art gallery.

In one of these rooms is a rich marble floor found under the oval fountain room of Domitian's Cenatio Iovis, and a rich nymphaeum with marble columns and bronze capitals. Today one corner of the nymphaeum has been rebuilt.

The cryptoporticus of Nero that connected the palace with the nearby Domus Tiberiana was also part of the complex. It is 130 m long with mosaic floors and elaborate stucco ceiling decoration with vegetal elements and cupids. It lies beneath the Horti Farnesiani along one side of the Domus Tiberiana.

The possible remains of Nero's rotating banquet hall and its underlying mechanism were unveiled by archaeologists on September 29, 2009.

Today, one of the best-preserved parts of the palace is the block of 50 communal toilets which would have been used by slaves and workers in Nero's time.

=== Pavilion on the Oppian Hill ===
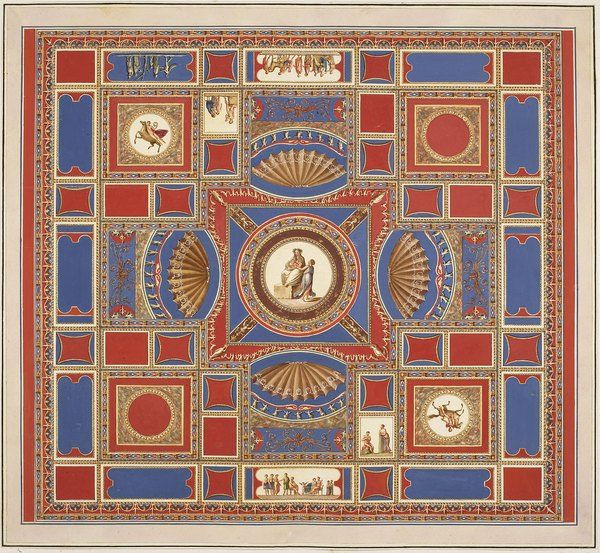
Reconstruction of the "golden vault" by Vincenzo Brenna

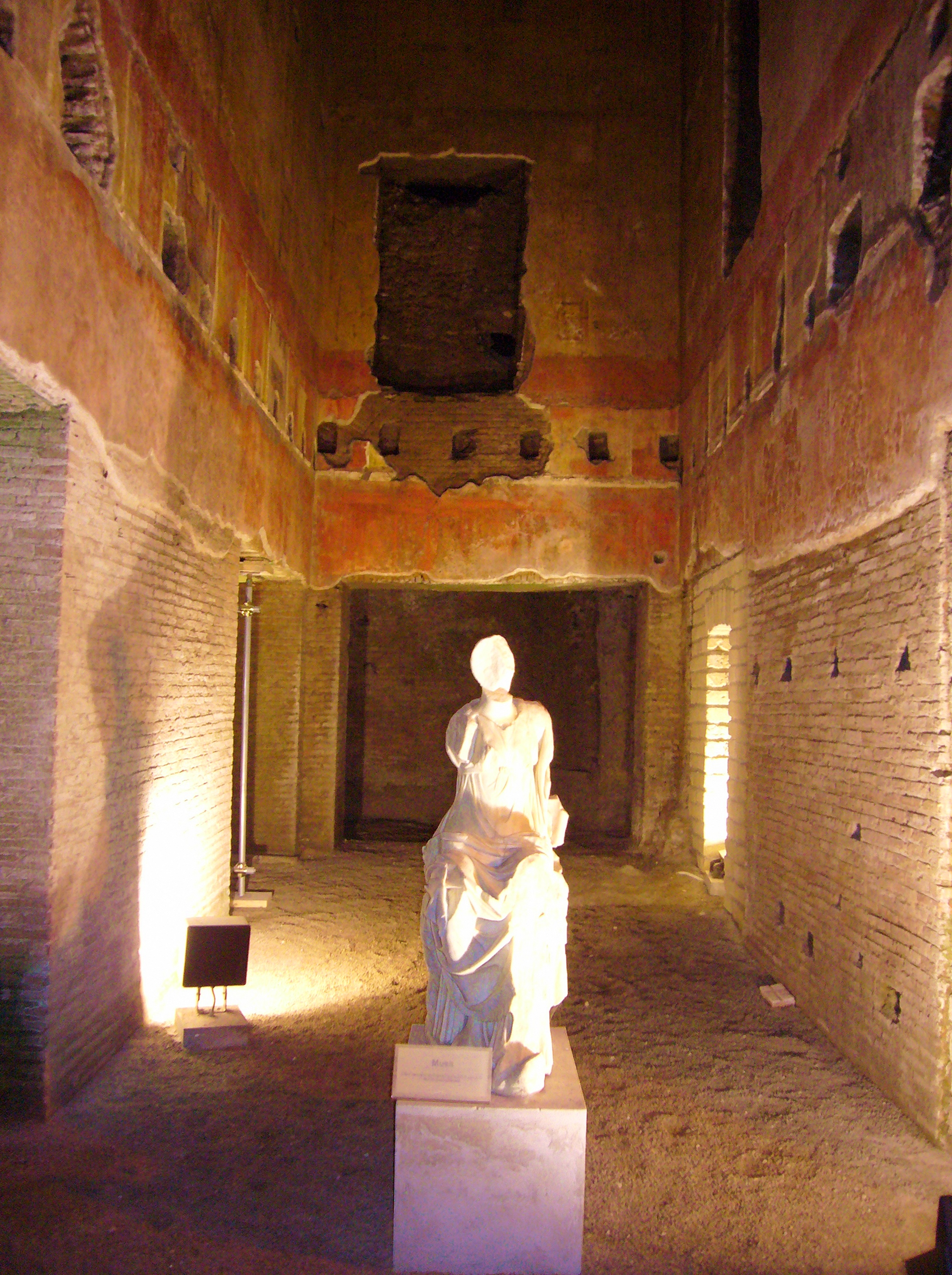
Statue of a muse in the newly reopened Domus Aurea

The Golden House building (pavilion) on the Oppian Hill (part of the Esquiline Hill) was extended from Nero's earlier Domus Transitoria and designed mainly as a place of entertainment, as shown by the presence of 300 rooms with few sleeping quarters.

Rooms sheathed in dazzling polished white marble with paintings above had richly varied floor plans, complete with niches and exedras that concentrated or dispersed the daylight. There were pools in the floors and fountains splashing in the corridors.

The building plan is divided into two parts: the western one is simple and classic in design, characterised by perpendicular axes and built around a large rectangular courtyard, which opened towards the valley and the lake. The eastern part is of a much richer design with two of the principal dining rooms flanking an octagonal court, surmounted by a dome with a giant central oculus to let in light. It was an early use of Roman concrete construction.

It also had an upper floor on the same level as the hill against which it rested (to the north). The surviving parts of this floor are preserved only to a height of 30/60 cm, and the thickness of the walls was also reduced to 40/50 cm so that it was a much less monumental body than the lower floor.

=== Decoration ===
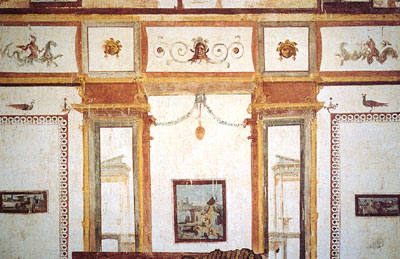
The style of wall paintings in Domus Aurea inspired both Raphael's Vatican Stanze and 18th-century Neoclassicism.

The extensive gold leaf that gave the palace its name was not the only extravagant element of its decor: stuccoed ceilings were faced with semi-precious stones and ivory veneers, while the walls were frescoed, coordinating the decoration into different themes in each major group of rooms. Pliny the Elder watched it being built and mentions it in his Naturalis Historia.

One innovation was destined to have an enormous influence on the art of the future: Nero placed mosaics, previously restricted to floors and gardens, in the vaulted ceilings. Only fragments have survived, but that technique was to be copied extensively, eventually ending up as a fundamental feature of Christian art: the apse mosaics that decorate so many churches in Rome, Ravenna, Sicily, and Constantinople.

Frescoes covered every surface that was not more richly finished. The main artist was Famulus (or Fabulus, or Amulius according to some sources). Fresco technique, working on damp plaster, demands a speedy and sure touch: Famulus and assistants from his studio covered a spectacular amount of wall area with frescoes. Pliny, in his Natural History, recounts how Famulus went for only a few hours each day to the Golden House, to work while the light was best. He wrote:

More recently, lived Amulius, a grave and serious personage, but a painter in the florid style. By this artist there was a Minerva, which had the appearance of always looking at the spectators, from whatever point it was viewed. He only painted a few hours each day, and then with the greatest gravity, for he always kept the toga on, even when in the midst of his implements. The Golden Palace of Nero was the prison-house of this artist's productions, and hence it is that there are so few of them to be seen elsewhere.

== Esquiline Wing ==
=== The Octagonal Room ===
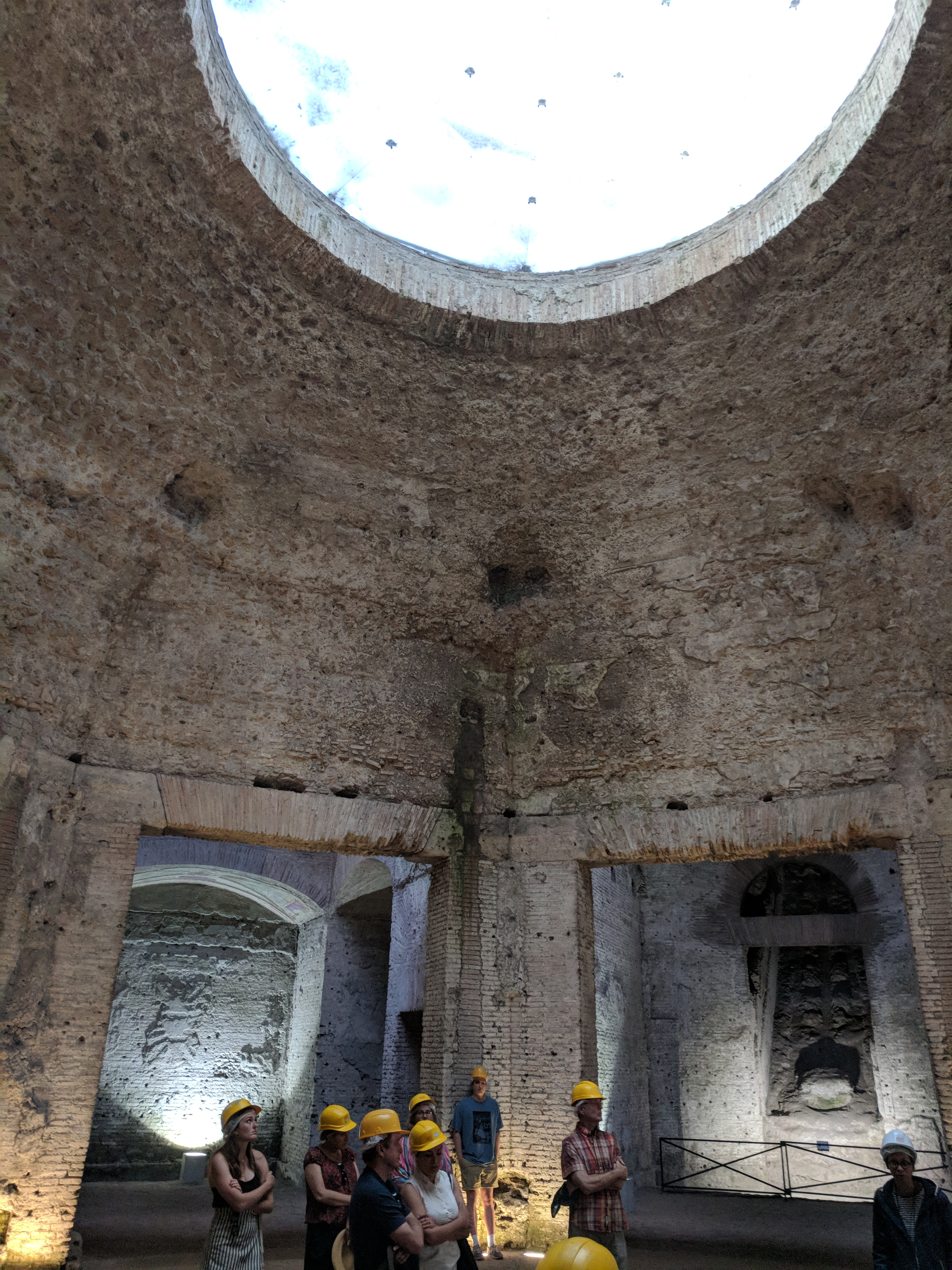
Octagonal Room

The octagonal room belonged to the Esquiline Wing of the Domus Aurea and was a masterpiece of Roman architecture. It overlooked a xystus – a track to watch gymnastic competitions – and the immense park. The lower part of the dome follows a pattern of octagonal segments (like Brunelleschi 's dome of S. Maria del Fiore in Florence), while the upper part assumes a circular shape. Some scholars suggest that many architectural and archaeoastronomical elements of the Octagonal Room served as a precedent for the construction of the Pantheon.

This domed room was a triclinium, where the emperor manifested himself as divine, through the effects of light that the dome filtered, assimilating himself to the god Apollo. It was built on the model of the cenatio praecipua rotunda (dining room whose ceiling constantly revolved like the heavens) which Carandini and Fraioli position in the pavilion. The ceiling of the octagonal hall could probably rotate by means of a mechanism created by Celer and Severus and similar to a millstone which, hooked to the uncovered tracks along the edge of the central opening, was moved by slaves. Perfume was sprayed and rose petals were dropped on the assembled diners. According to some accounts, perhaps embellished by Nero's political enemies, on one occasion such quantities of rose petals were dropped that one unlucky guest was asphyxiated (a similar story is told of the emperor Elagabalus).

On the sides of the octagonal room there were two apartments: the "room of Achilles in Skyros" and the "room of Hector and Andromache", judged from their paintings. The side spaces served both as passageways and as buttress elements for the dome; These spaces were accessed through large openings surmounted by brick courses. This was probably one of the models from which the famous dome of the Pantheon drew inspiration: it is in fact an early example of the use of the cementitious technique, which had been developed by the Romans from the second century BC for the development of large and articulated interior spaces

The Esquiline Wing, and in particular the Octagonal Room, are notable for the archaeoastronomical elements of their construction. Hannah, Magli, and Palmieri write in particular of a "hierophany" occurring on the equinoxes:

At local noon on the days of the equinoxes, the annular beam of light entering the oculus hits the jamb of the northern entrance-way. The height of the upper opening and its width are therefore calibrated in such a way that the lower rim of the sunbeam strikes the juncture between the floor and the doorway's threshold, while the beam encircles the jambs. The sun measures out the dimensions of this opening and, by extension of the other openings, the walls of the room.

=== The Sphinx Room ===
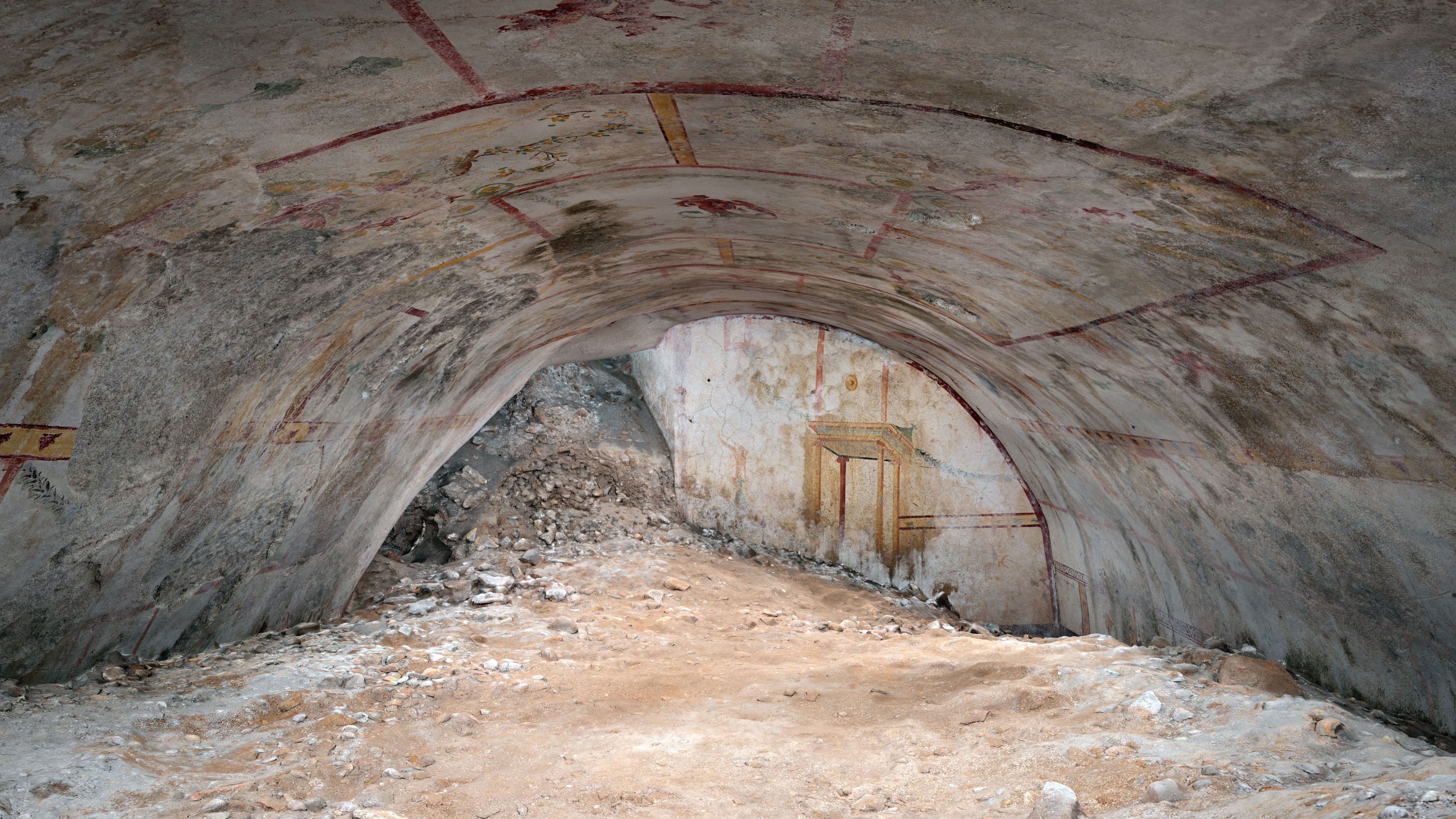
Sala della Sfinge (Sphinx Hall), discovered in 2018

During renovation works at the end of 2018, experts discovered a barrel-vaulted room (room 72) in the Esquiline Wing of the complex. The room was richly decorated with panthers, centaurs, the god Pan, and a sphinx, believed to have been built between 65 and 68 AD. A mythological scene on its North wall earned the room the title of "Sphinx room". The frescoes were of similar style to those in the cryptoporticus (room 92) which allows attribution to the so-called "A" workshop.

==== Decoration ====
Paintings in the fourth style cover "all visible surfaces" in the room. The painting of the room consists of white backgrounds and poly-chromatic ornamentation. Caggiani, Coccato, Mazzoleni et al. describe the decoration of the barrel vault in detail:

The decoration of the barrel vault is arranged within a triple red frame and divided into different compartments by yellow and/or red bands, all bordered by an external perimeter rectangle made of golden-yellow bands with red vegetal ornamental motifs, repeated at the corners in curved bands.

Within these compartments, a series of anthromorphic and zoomorphic figures are depicted. The central painting shows a figure armed against a panther, while the remaining show Pan accompanied by centaurs and musical instruments. Beyond the outermost frame, fantastical and real aquatic creatures are seen and the vault is further decorated with ornate vegetal motifs.

==== Pigment and technique analysis ====
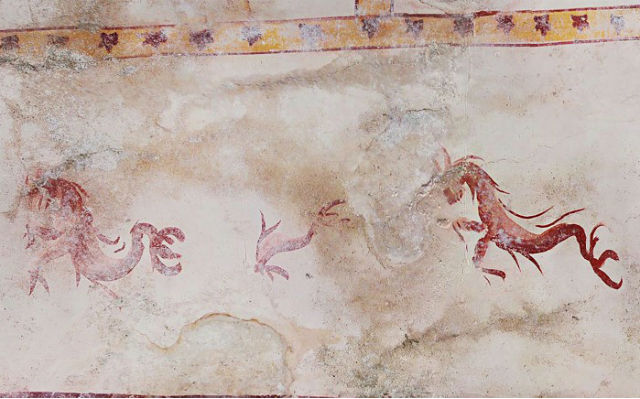
Fresco of sea-horses in the Sala della Sfinge

As part of a larger analytical project, the "Non-destructive analytical studies at Parco Archeologico del Colosseo (Rome, Italy)", the Sphinx room has been subject to analysis of the methods, tools, and materials used to create its paintings. Analysis has been performed both in situ and on micro-fragments from the site. The results of the pigment analysis revealed a common Roman palette of "Egyptian blue, green earths, iron- and lead-based red, orange and yellow, lead white, calcite, [and] carbon black" which allows comparison between the Sphinx Room and other rooms in the Domus Aurea as well as other Roman complexes.

Fragment analysis revealed that different painting techniques were employed within the room: yellow, yellow-red, black, and brown pigmented fragments showed the fresco style, while in blue, red, and green fragments a "unique lime paint pictorial layer" was used.

== See also ==
- Ancient Roman architecture
- List of ancient monuments in Rome
- Symbolism of domes

== Sources ==
- Ball, Larry F. (2003). The Domus Aurea and the Roman architectural revolution. Cambridge University Press. ISBN 0-521-82251-3.
- Boethius, Axel (1960). The Golden House of Nero. Ann Arbor: University of Michigan.
- Caggiani, Maria Cristina; Coccato, Alessia; Mazzoleni, Paolo (2020). "Integrated analytical approach to unveil the secrets of the recently discovered "Sphinx Room": a new piece of Domus Aurea puzzle". Heritage Science. 8 (1): 124. doi:10.1186/s40494-020-00465-1. ISSN 2050-7445.
- Clementi, Catia; Ciocan, Valeria; Vagnini, Manuela (2011). "Non-invasive and micro-destructive investigation of the Domus Aurea wall painting decorations". Analytical and Bioanalytical Chemistry. 401 (6): 1815–1826. Bibcode:2011ABiCh.401.1815C. doi:10.1007/s00216-011-5250-6. PMID 21805319.
- Claridge, Amanda (1998). Rome: An Oxford Archaeological Guide. New York: Oxford University. ISBN 0-19-288003-9.
- Coccato, Alessia; Caggiani, Maria Cristina; Occhipinti, Roberta; Mazzoleni, Paolo; D'Alessio, Alessandro; Russo, Alfonsina; Barone, Germana (2021). "The Irreplaceable Contribution of Cross Sections Investigation: Painted Plasters from the Sphinx Room (Domus Aurea, Rome)". Minerals. 11 (1): 4. doi:10.3390/min11010004. ISSN 2075-163X.
- Hannah, Robert; Magli, Giulio; Palmieri, Antonella (2016). "Nero's 'Solar' Kingship and the Architecture of the Domus Aurea". Numen. 63 (5/6): 511–524. arXiv:1312.7583. doi:10.1163/15685276-12341436. ISSN 0029-5973. JSTOR 44505307.
- Palmer, Alasdair (1999-07-11). "Nero's pleasure dome". London Sunday Times.
- Romey, Kristin M. (July–August 2001). "The Rain in Rome". Archaeology. 54 (4). Archaeological Institute of America: 20. ISSN 0003-8113.
- Roth, Leland M. (1993). Understanding Architecture: Its Elements, History and Meaning (First ed.). Boulder, CO: Westview Press. pp. 227–8. ISBN 0-06-430158-3.
- Pliny, C. Secundus (c. 77). Natural History.
- Richardson, Lawrence (1992). A New Topographical Dictionary of Ancient Rome. The Johns Hopkins University Press. ISBN 0-8018-4300-6.
- Russo, Alfonsina (2022). "Domus Aurea in-Visible: from research to fruition". LANX. Journal of the Scuola di Specializzazione in Beni Archeologici - Università Degli Studi di Milano (30): 72–84. doi:10.54103/2035-4797/18368. ISSN 2035-4797.
- Segala, Elisabetta; Ida Sciortino (1999). Domus Aurea. Milan: Electa. ISBN 88-435-7164-8.
- Spartianus, Aelius (117-284). Historia Augusta: The Life of Hadrian.
- Warden, P.G. (1981). "The Domus Aurea Reconsidered". Journal of the Society of Architectural Historians. 40 (4): 271–278. doi:10.2307/989644. JSTOR 989644.

Preceded by Domus Augustana	Landmarks of Rome; Domus Aurea	Succeeded by Domus Transitoria
