= Esquiline Hill =

One of the seven hills of Rome, Italy

Coordinates: 41°53′44″N 12°29′48″E

- One of the seven hills of Rome
- Latin name: Collis Esquilinus
- Italian name: Esquilino
- Rione: Esquilino
- Buildings: Domus Aurea, baths of Trajan, nymphaeum misassociated with Minerva Medica
- Ancient Roman religion: Temple of Minerva Medica (non-extant)
- Roman sculptures: Discobolus

Map of Rome showing the Seven Hills and Servian Wall

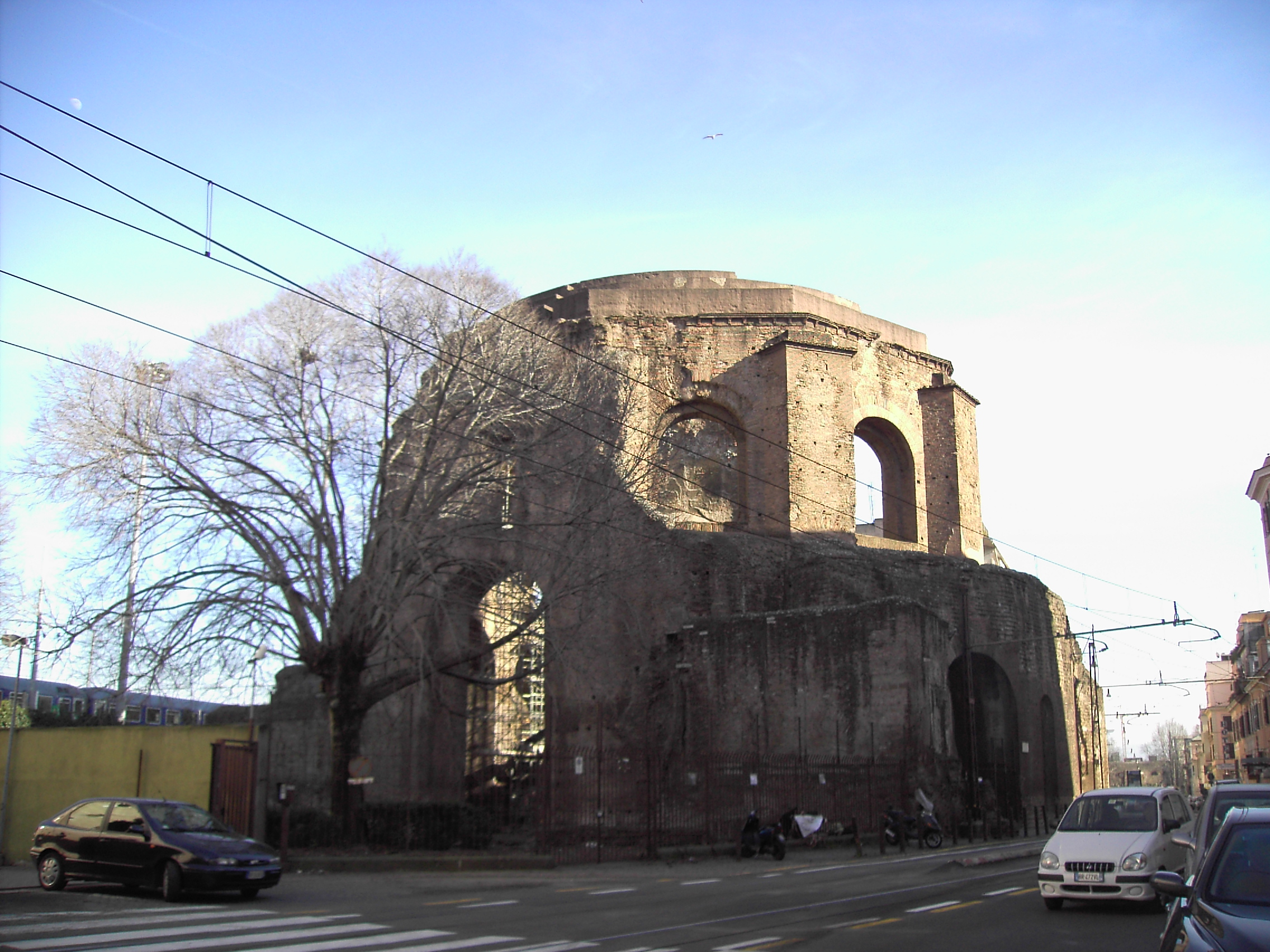
The so-called "Temple of Minerva Medica", a nymphaeum

The Esquiline Hill (/ˈɛskwɪlaɪn/ ESK-wil-eyen; Latin: Collis Esquilinus; Italian: Esquilino [eskwiˈliːno]) is one of the Seven Hills of Rome. Its southernmost cusp is the Oppius (Oppian Hill). The area was favoured by the Roman aristocracy for their houses throughout the Roman period.

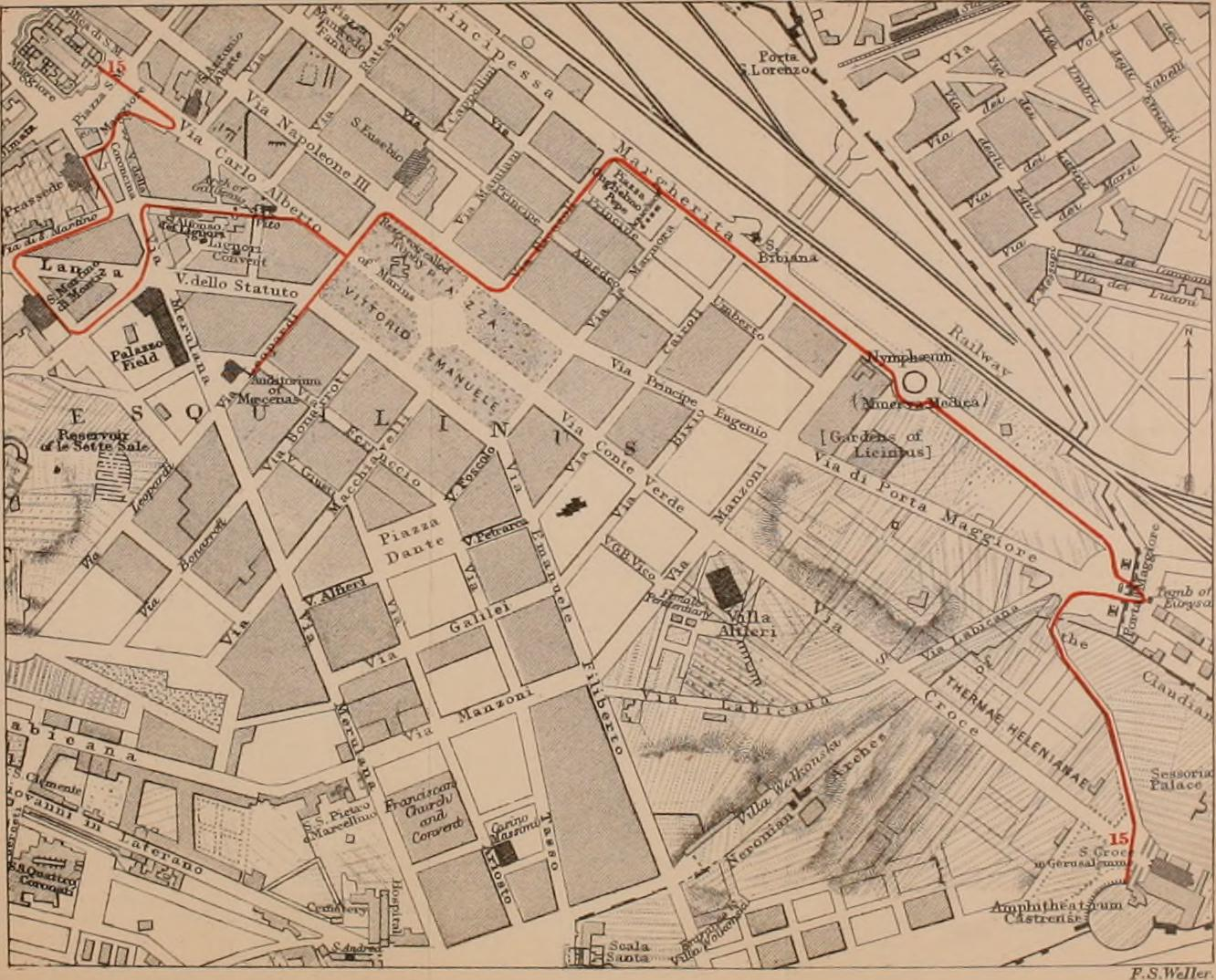
A handbook of Rome and the Campagna (1899) (14762604401)

== Etymology ==
The origin of the name Esquiline is still under much debate. One view is that the hill was named after the abundance of aesculi (Italian oaks) growing there. Another view is that, during Rome's infancy, the Capitolium, the Palatinum, and the northern fringes of the Caelian were the most-populated areas of the city, whose inhabitants were considered inquilini ("in-towners"); those who inhabited the external regions – Aurelian, Oppius, Cispius, Fagutal – were considered exquilini ("suburbanites").

== History ==
The Esquiline Hill includes three prominent spurs, which are sometimes called "hills" as well:

- Cispian (Cispius) – northern spur
- Oppian (Oppius) – southern spur
- Fagutal (Fagutalis) – western spur

Rising above the valley in which was later built the Colosseum, the Esquiline was a fashionable residential district.

According to Livy, the settlement on the Esquiline was expanded during the reign of Servius Tullius, Rome's sixth king, in the 6th century BC. The king also moved his residence to the hill in order to increase its respectability.

The political advisor and art patron Maecenas (70–8 BC) sited his gardens, the first in the Hellenistic-Persian garden style in Rome, on the Esquiline Hill, atop the Servian Wall and its adjoining necropolis. It contained terraces, libraries and other aspects of Roman culture. At the Oppius, Nero (37 AD–68 AD) confiscated property to build his extravagant, mile-long Golden House, and later still Trajan (53–117) constructed his bath complex, both of whose remains are visible today. The 3rd-century Horti Liciniani, a group of gardens (including the relatively well-preserved nymphaeum formerly identified as the non-extant Temple of Minerva Medica), were probably constructed on the Esquiline Hill. Farther to the northeast, at the summit of the Cispius, is the Basilica of Santa Maria Maggiore.

In 1781, the first known copy of the marble statue of a discus thrower – the Discobolus of Myron – was discovered on the Roman property of the Massimo family, the Villa Palombara, on the Esquiline Hill. The famous Esquiline Treasure, now in the British Museum, was found on the Esquiline Hill.

== Namesakes ==
- The tiny hamlet of El Esquilinchuche in Honduras is named after the Esquiline Hill.

== See also ==
- Janiculum Hill
- Monte Mario
- Pincian Hill
- Vatican Hill
- Velian Hill
