= Baths of Commodus =

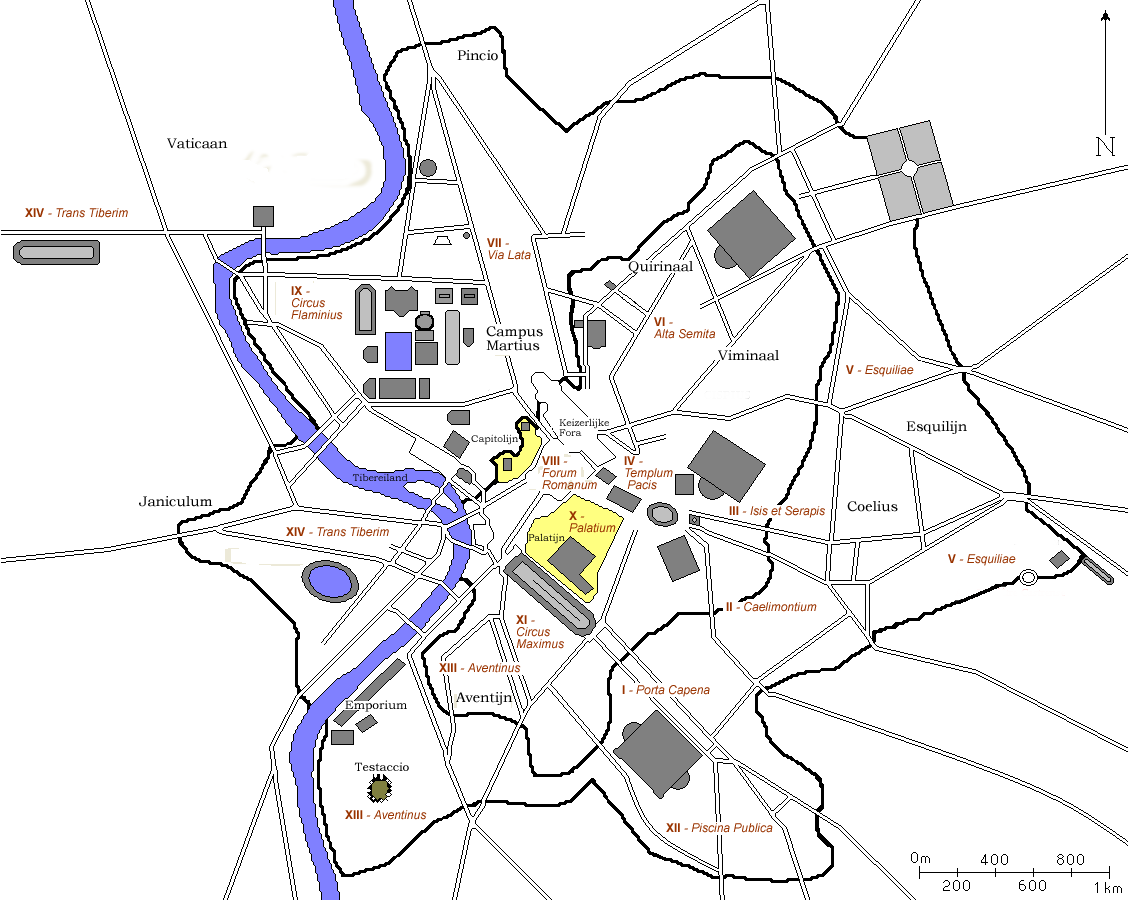
The building between Areas I and XII is the Baths of Antoninus Caracalla; the Baths of Commodus were also located nearby.

The Baths of Commodus (Latin: Thermae Comodianae) or Baths of Cleander (Latin: Thermae Cleandri) was a thermae (baths) complex in Rome, in Regio I Porta Capena, presumably to the south or south-east of the Baths of Caracalla. Although mentioned by several ancient authors no archaeological remains survive.

They were built by Marcus Aurelius Cleander, a favourite of the emperor Commodus and dedicated in 183, in the fourth year of Commodus' reign. It included a gymnasium.

== Bibliography ==
- Samuel Ball Platner, A Topographical Dictionary of Ancient Rome, Oxford University Press, London, 1929 (completed and revised by Thomas Ashby), on: Bill Thayer's LacusCurtius.
