= Regio XII Piscina Publica =

Historical region of Rome

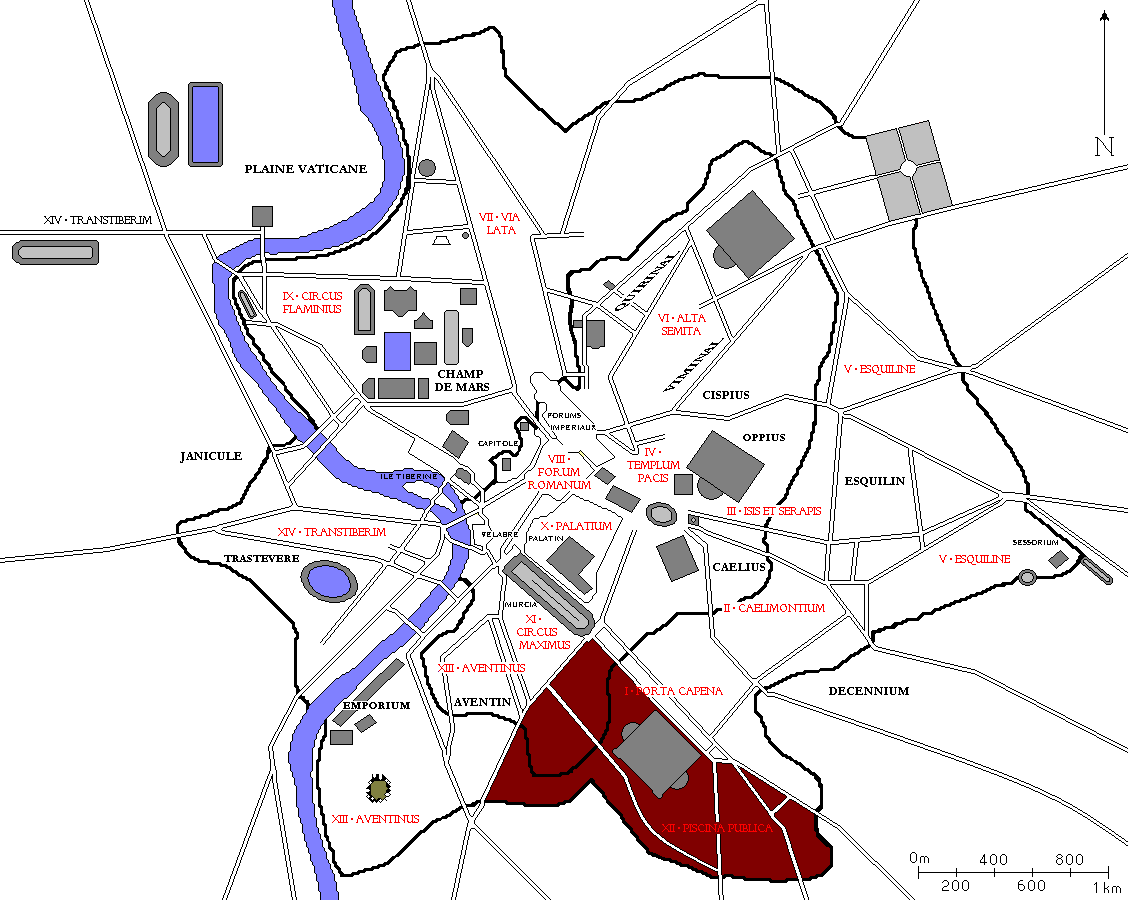

The Regio XII Piscina Publica is the twelfth regio of imperial Rome, under Augustus's administrative reform. Regio XII took its name from the Piscina Publica, a swimming pool that disappeared during the middle imperial period.

== Geographic extent and important features ==
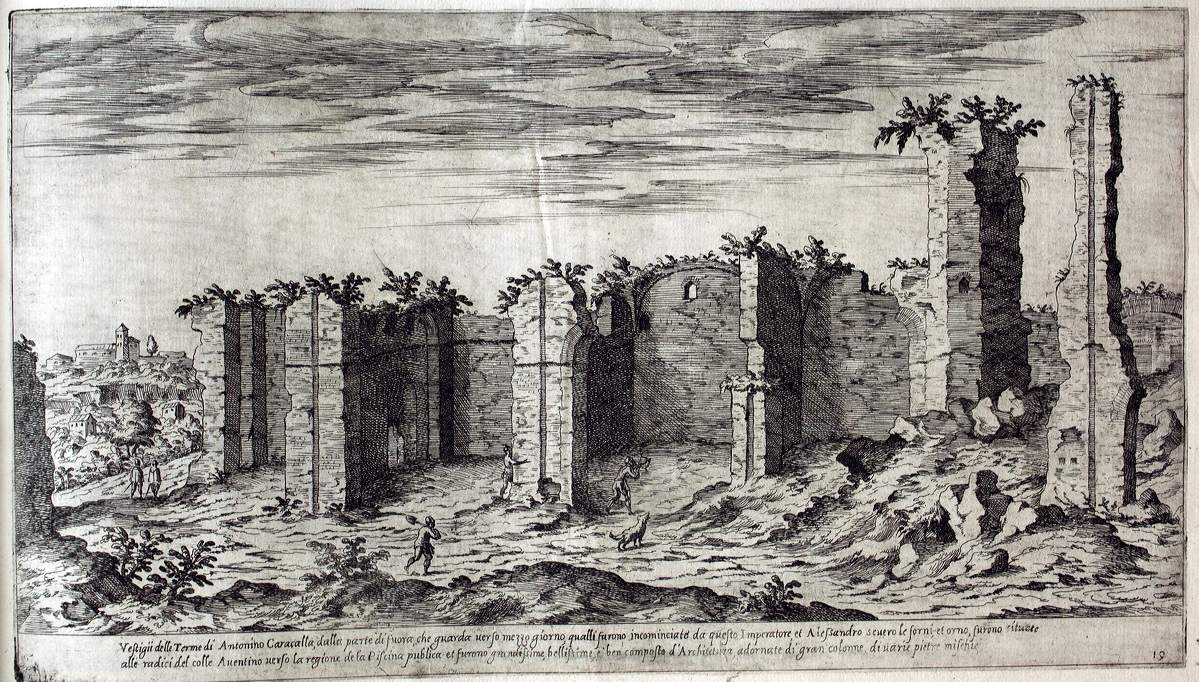
Drawing of the ruins of the Baths of Caracalla (1575)

Regio XII was named after the principal feature of this area during the reign of Augustus, the Piscina Publica, a public reservoir and swimming pool, built around the 3rd century BCE. In extent, this region was bordered by the Vicus Piscinae Publicae to the north, the Via Ostiensis to the west, the Via Appia and the Via Latina to the east, and the Aurelian Walls to the south. Its principal gates through the walls were the Porta Appia and the Porta Ardeatina. A measurement taken at the end of the 4th century recorded that the perimeter of the region was 12,000 Roman feet (approximately 3.5 km), making it one of the smaller of the Augustan regions.

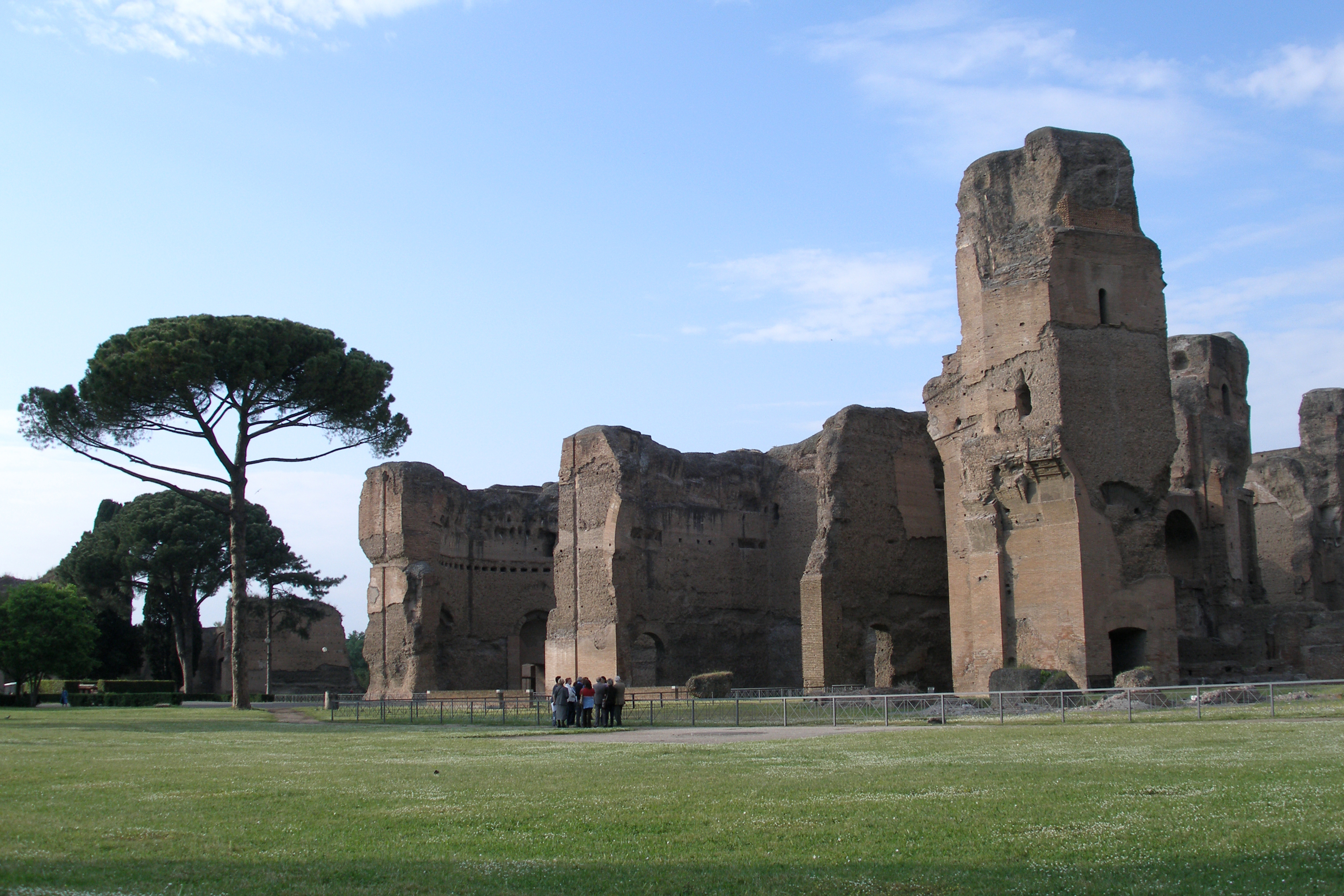
The remains of the Baths of Caracalla

The Piscina itself sat in the low-lying area between the Via Appia, the Servian Wall, and the northeast slope of the Aventine Hill. If it was still present, it was eventually destroyed to make way for the monumental Baths of Caracalla in the 3rd century CE, whose massive ruins are still visible. In addition, the region hosted the Temple of Bona Dea. Its principal street was the Via Nova, which ran parallel to the Via Appia, and took people from the Circus Maximus to the Baths of Caracalla. In the 180s, a bank and exchange for Christians operated in this region.

== Notable residences ==
Near the Aventine stood the domus where Hadrian resided after his adoption by Trajan, as well as that of Annia Cornificia Faustina, sister of Marcus Aurelius. There was also the residence of Lucius Fabius Cilo, consul in 204, given to him by his friend Septimius Severus. Which was eventually turned into the church of Santa Balbina. This luxurious ensemble, today poorly documented, attests to the gradual relocation of great families away from the center of Rome. Due to urban densification and the proliferation of public buildings, these elites progressively withdrew to the city's hills, and some residences were destroyed to make way for the Baths of Caracalla. One of the most remarkable buildings in the area was the Domus Parthorum, also known as the "House of the Parthians." This vast complex, likely originally intended for public use, dates back to the Severan period. It bears similarities to the reception halls of aristocratic residences of late Rome, suggesting it may have later been privatized. Unlike other domus of this period, it underwent an exceptional restoration program. An apsidal hall was added during a third construction phase in the 4th century AD, and some scholars have suggested the presence of a religious building within it, which would explain the scale of the renovation works. However, the building was severely damaged by a fire in the 5th century, leading to its abandonment. Today, its location corresponds to the Stadio Nando Martellini, near the Baths of Caracalla.

== Subdivisions ==
At the turn of the 5th century, the Regio contained 17aediculae (shrines), 2.487 insulae (apartment building), 113 domūs (patrician houses), 27 horrea (warehouses), 63 balneae (bath houses) and 81 loci (fountains). It had two curators and was served by 48 Roman magistrates. The region also contained the station of the fourth cohort of the Vigiles.
