= 14 regions of Augustan Rome =

Administrative subdivisions of ancient Rome

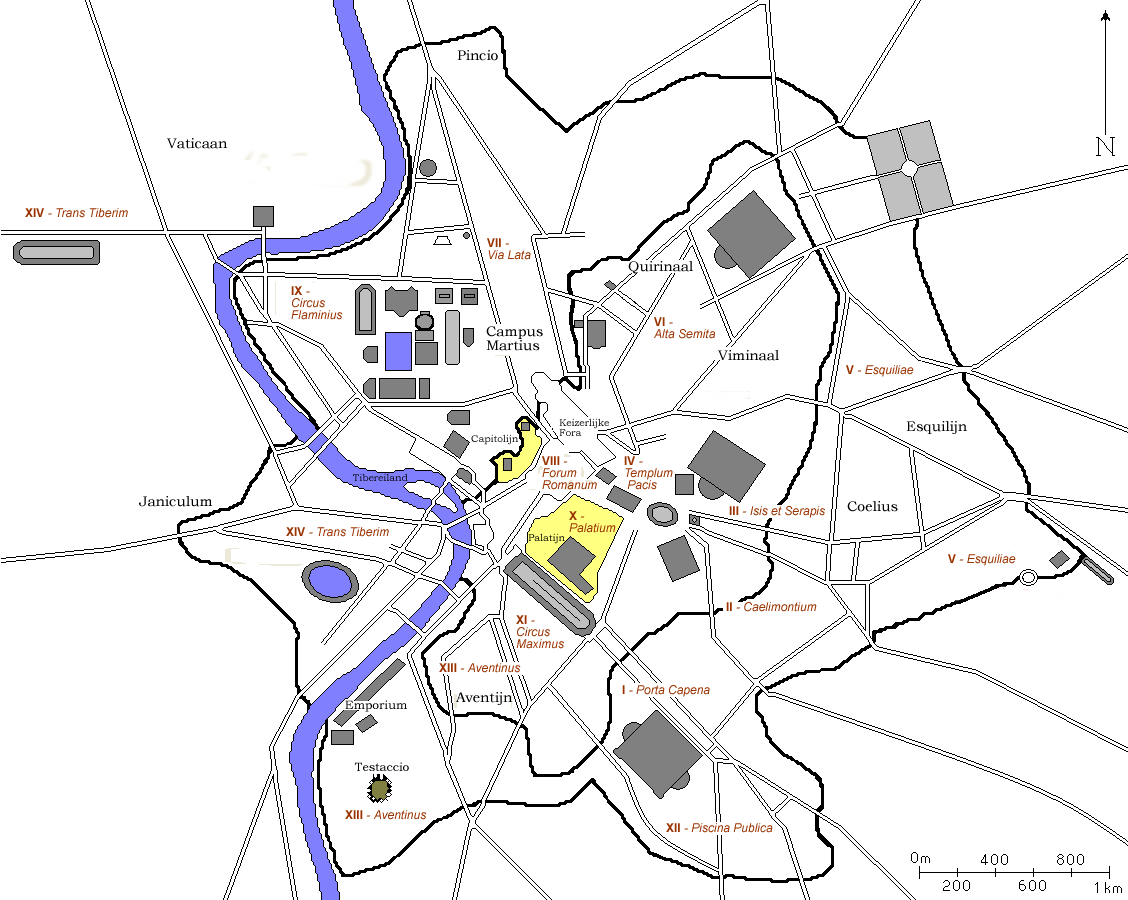
Map of ancient Rome with the regions

In 7 BC, Augustus divided the city of Rome into 14 administrative regions (Latin regiones, sing. regio). These replaced the four regiones—or "quarters"—traditionally attributed to Servius Tullius, sixth king of Rome. They were further divided into official neighborhoods (vici).

Originally designated by number, the regions acquired nicknames from major landmarks or topographical features within them. After the reign of Constantine the Great, the imperial city of Constantinople was also divided into fourteen regiones, on the Roman example: the 14 regions of Constantinople.

== History of Rome's regions ==
Evidence of regions in Rome before Augustus is limited. Writing in the mid-40s BC, Marcus Terentius Varro describes four 'partes urbis', referring to them individually as a ‘regio’ with both names and numbers: I Suburana, II Esquilina, III Collina and IV Palatina.

Varro also provides evidence for vici in Republican Rome, deriving the word vicus from via and which are analogous to our modern ‘neighbourhoods’. By the middle Republic each vicus had a local official known as a vicomagister.

By the time of Augustus, local shrines in the vici had become neglected and from around 12 BC he began restoring individual vicus shrines before comprehensive reform in 7 BC, including codifying the rights and duties of the vicomagistri. At this time, the city was reorganised into the fourteen Augustan 'regiones' overseen by senatorial magistrates.

== The 14 regions ==
Currently ancient Rome covers the modern municipio 1.

=== I: Regio I Porta Capena ===
Regio I took its name from the Porta Capena ("Gate to Capua"), a gate of the Servian Wall, through which the Appian Way enters the city. Beginning from this to the south of the Caelian Hill, it runs to the future track of the Aurelian Walls.

=== II: Regio II Caelimontium ===
Regio II encompassed the Caelian Hill.

=== III: Regio III Isis et Serapis ===
Regio III took its name from the sanctuary of Isis, in the area of the modern Labicana street, containing the valley that was to be the site of the Colosseum, and parts of the Oppian and Esquiline hills.

=== IV: Regio IV Templum Pacis ===
Regio IV took its name from the Temple of Peace, built in the region by Vespasian. It includes the valley between the Esquiline and the Viminal hills, the popular area of the Subura, and the Velian Hill (the hill between the Palatine and the Oppian Hill, removed in the early 20th century to make way for the Via dei Fori Imperiali, the street passing between the Forum Romanum and the Forum of Augustus).

=== V: Regio V Esquiliae ===
The name of Regio V derives from the Esquiline Hill. It contains parts of the Oppian and Cispian (two minor hills close to the city center) and of the Esquiline, plus the plain just outside the Servian Wall.

=== VI: Regio VI Alta Semita ===
The name of Regio VI derives from the street (Alta Semita, "High Path") passing over the Quirinal Hill. It was a large regio that encompassed also the Viminal Hill, the lower slopes of the Pincian, and the valleys between these. Its major landmarks included the Baths of Diocletian, the Baths of Constantine, and the Gardens of Sallust; gardens (horti) covered much of its northern part. Temples to Quirinus, Salus, and Flora were also located in Regio VI, and the Castra Praetoria. The Aurelian Walls marked most of its eastern and northern edge, with the Argiletum and Vicus Patricius on the south and southeast.

=== VII: Regio VII Via Lata ===
The name of Regio VII was derived from the via Flaminia, which runs between the Servian Wall and the future Aurelian Walls. This was a wide urban street (Via Lata, "Broadway"), corresponding to the modern via del Corso. The regio contained part of the Campus Martius on the east of the street plus the Collis Hortulorum (Hill of the Hortuli), the Pincian Hill (modern Pincio).

=== VIII: Regio VIII Forum Romanum ===
The central region contains the Capitoline Hill, the valley between the Palatine and the Capitoline hills (where the Forum Romanum is located), and the area between Velian Hill and the Palatine up to the Arch of Titus and the Temple of Venus and Roma.

=== IX: Regio IX Circus Flaminius ===
The name derives from the racecourse located in the southern end of the Campus Martius, close to Tiber Island. The region contains part of the Campus Martius, on the west side of via Lata.

=== X: Regio X Palatium ===
The Palatine Hill gave its name to Regio X.

=== XI: Regio XI Circus Maximus ===
Regio XI took its name from the Circus Maximus, located in the valley between the Palatine and the Aventine. It contained the Circus Maximus, the Velabrum (the valley between the Palatine and Capitoline), as well as the areas next to the Forum Boarium and the Forum Holitorium.

=== XII: Regio XII Piscina Publica ===
Regio XII took its name from the Piscina Publica, a monument that disappeared during the Empire. It had the high ground where the church of San Saba is at present, plus its ramifications towards the Appian Way, where the Baths of Caracalla were.

In the 180s, a bank and exchange for Christians operated in the area.

=== XIII: Regio XIII Aventinus ===
Regio XIII contained the Aventine Hill and the plain in front of it, along the Tiber. Here was the emporium, the first port on the river.

=== XIV: Regio XIV Transtiberim ===
Regio XIV (the region "across the Tiber") contained Tiber Island and all the parts of Rome west beyond the Tiber. This is modern Trastevere.

== See also ==
- Topography of ancient Rome
