= Piscina Publica =

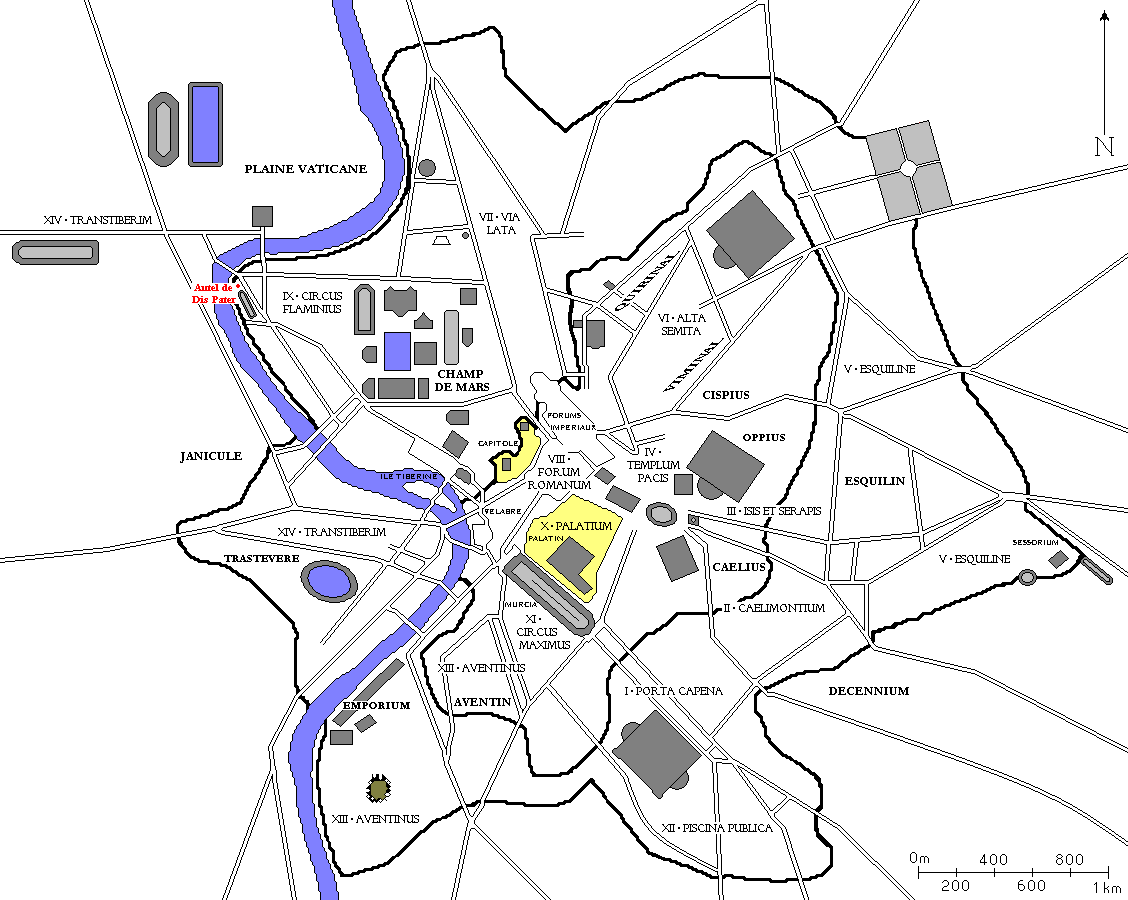
Map showing the Piscina Publica bottom right

In ancient Rome, the Piscina Publica ("Public Pool") was a public reservoir and swimming pool located in Regio XII. The region itself came to be called informally Piscina Publica from the landmark. The piscina was situated in the low-lying area between the Via Appia, the Servian Wall, and the northeast slope of the Aventine Hill, an area later occupied by the Baths of Caracalla.

There is some disagreement as to whether the reservoir was fed by one of several springs in the immediate area or by the Aqua Appia, the first public aqueduct built by Appius Claudius Caecus. Located just inside the Porta Capena, it was the first site for both communal water distribution and sports. The aqueduct supplied water for wool processors near the piscina.

Mention of a piscina publica was first made in 215 BC, when the two city praetors moved their tribunals to the site, near where the Senate was meeting with generals to discuss the ongoing Hannibalic War. A reference in Festus indicates that it no longer existed in the 2nd century.

== See also ==
- List of Roman cisterns
