= Regio XIV Transtiberim =

Historical region of Rome

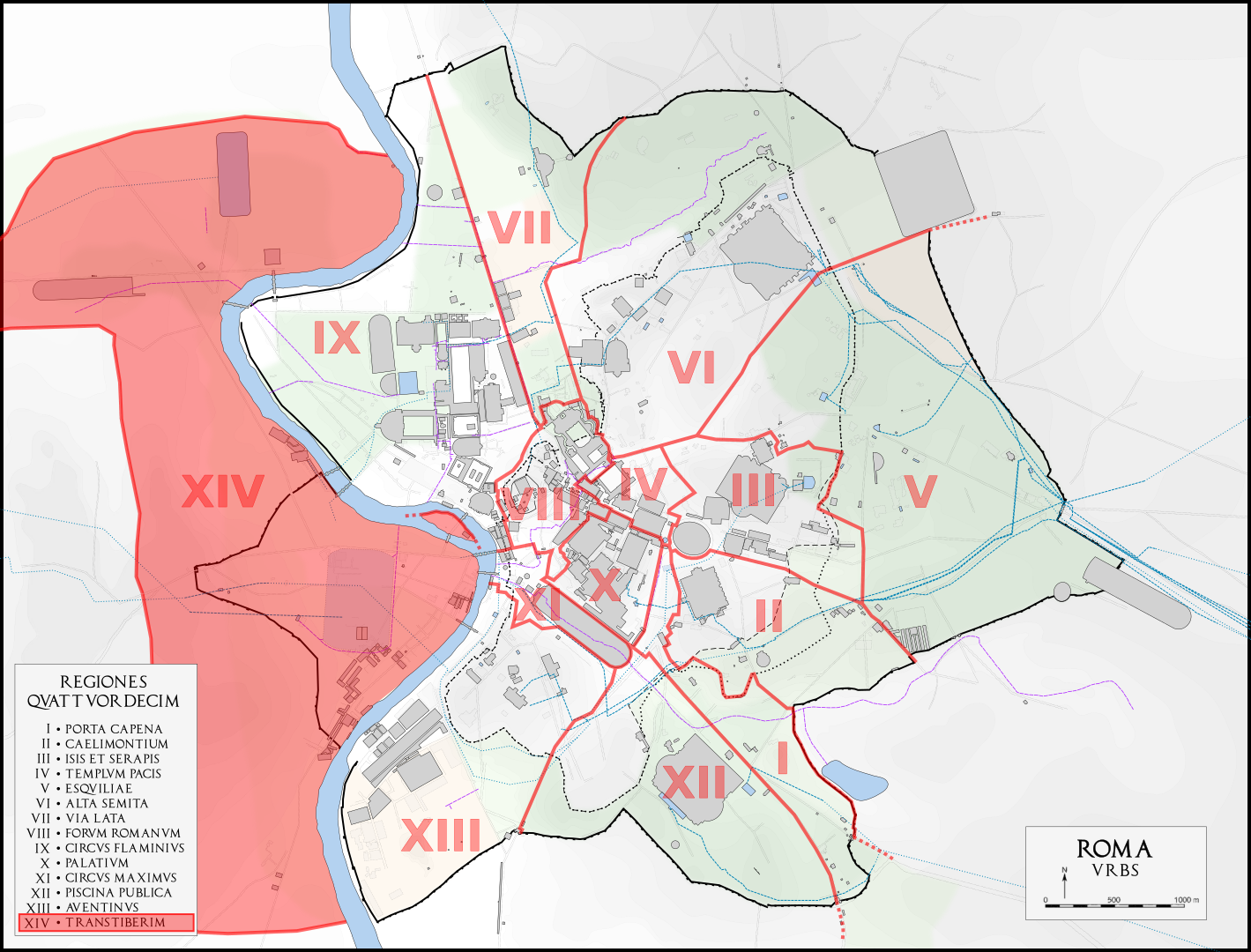

The Regio XIV Transtiberim is the fourteenth regio of imperial Rome, under Augustus's administrative reform. Meaning "across the Tiber", the Regio took its name from its position on the west bank of the Tiber River.

== Geographic extent and important features ==
Regio XIV comprised the land around the two hills on the west side of the Tiber, the Vatican Hill to the north (including the Ager Vaticanus) and the Janiculum Hill to the south, as well as the Tiber Island. While the area around the Janiculum was eventually encased with the Aurelian Walls, the area around the Vatican did not possess any walls until the ninth century. The principal roads that exited and entered the region were the Via Cornelia, the Via Aurelia (through the Porta Aurelia) and the Via Portuensis (through the Porta Portuensis). The final gate in the Aurelian Walls in this region was the Porta Settimiana. A measurement taken at the end of the 4th century recorded that the perimeter of the region was 33,388 Roman feet (approximately 9.9 km), making it the largest of the Augustan regions.

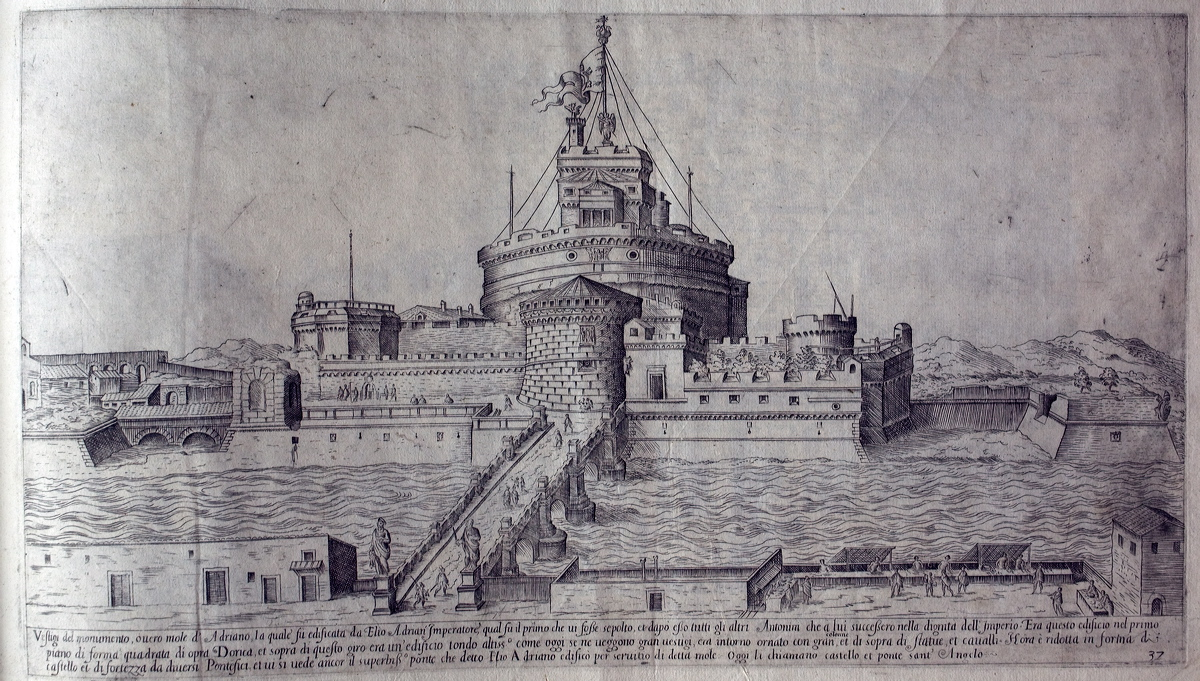
Drawing of the Mausoleum of Hadrian (1575)

This region was largely devoted to entertaining the Roman people, so it was dotted with many extensive gardens and parks. It was also popular with the emperors, and they would frequently reside in their imperial villas in this part of Rome when not performing their official duties. Such imperial gardens included the Horti Agrippinae, the Gardens of Nero and the Horti Domitiae. In the north of the region was an entertainment complex which included the Circus of Gaius (for many years mistakenly called the Circus of Nero) and the Naumachia Traiani, where mock naval battles were held. By the middle of the 4th century, the Circus of Nero had largely been built over by the Basilica of Saint Peter, built on the orders of Constantine I. Close by is the Mausoleum of Hadrian.

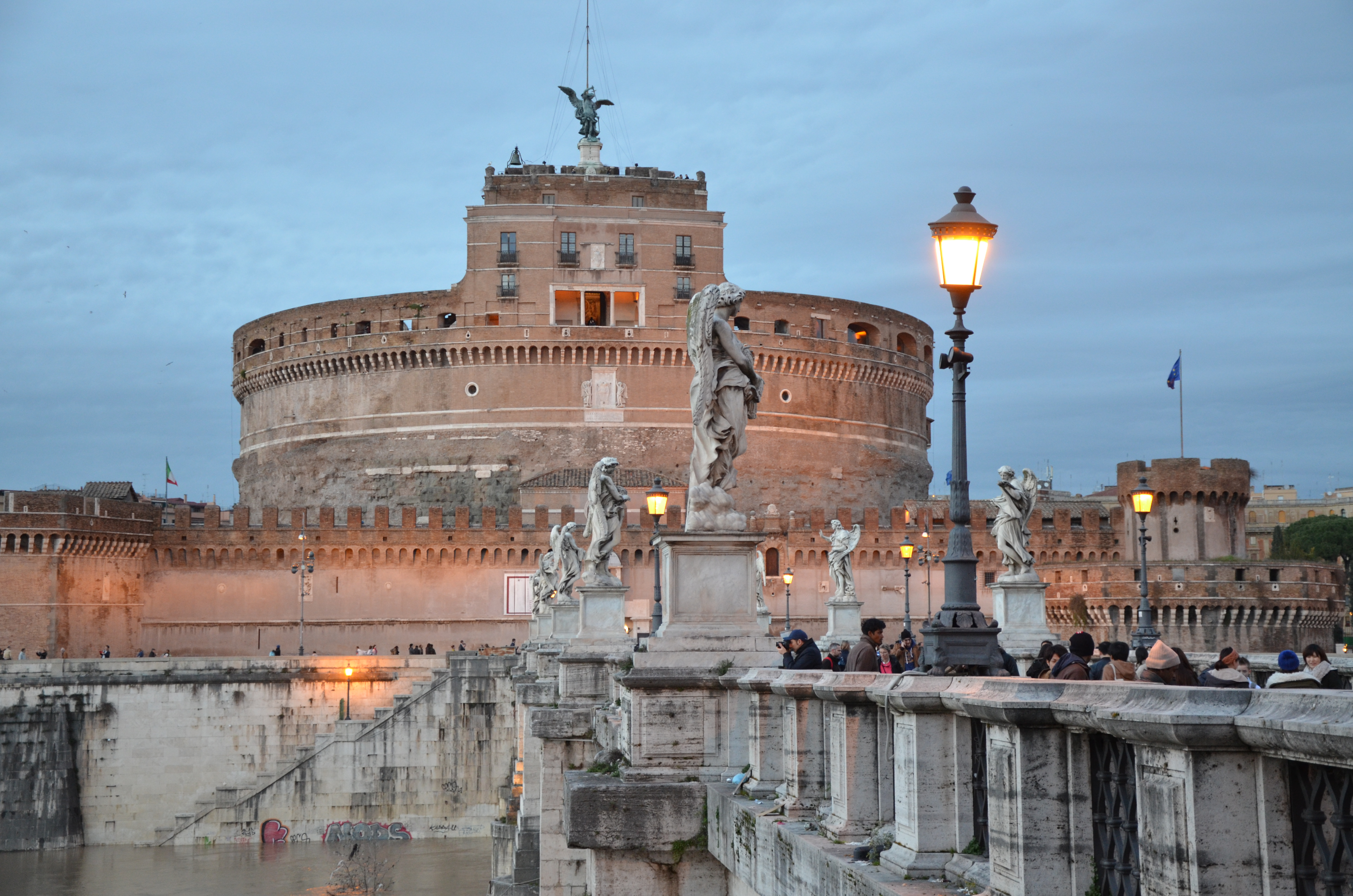
The Mausoleum of Hadrian

In the area below the Janiculum stood the Naumachia of Augustus, one of the five naumachiae in Regio XIV. It was in the area around the Janiculum where most of the population in Transtiberim lived. Around the Porta Settimiana stood the Gardens of Geta, laid out by his father. Further along stood the nemus Cæsarum (or sacred forest of the Caesars), while at the southernmost extremity of the region stood the Horti Caesaris gardens, which included a villa belonging to Julius Caesar where Cleopatra stayed during her visit to Rome. Regio XIV also contained several religious sites, including a shrine to Cybele and one to Furrina, as well as a temple to Fors Fortuna.

On the Tiber Island stood the Temple of Asclepius. In addition, it contained several shrines:

- Jupiter Jurarius ("guarantor of oaths")
- Semo Sancus Dius Fidius, also a witness of oaths
- Gaia, yet another witness of oaths
- Faunus, boundary deity
- Vejovis, god of healing
- Tiberinus, river god
- Bellona, war goddess

Among the more obscure features mentioned in the 5th century Notitia in this region was a prominent statue to an unknown member of the gens Valeria, and the “Sleeping Hercules”, a buried statue of the god. The region also contained the station of the seventh cohort of the Vigiles. At the turn of the 5th century, the Regio contained 78 aediculae (shrines), 150 domūs (patrician houses), 22 horrea (warehouses), 86 balneae (bath houses) and 180 loci (fountains).

== Bridges and Subdivisions ==
As Regio XIV was situated across the Tiber, passage to and from this region to the rest of Rome was by bridge, of which there were eight:

- the Pons Sublicius, Rome’s oldest bridge;
- the Pons Aemilius, known as the broken bridge;
- the Pons Fabricius, named after Lucius Fabricius, a curator of roads;
- the Pons Cestius, also known as the Pons Gratiani, after the emperor who restored it;
- the Pons Aurelius, which was partially destroyed in 772 CE;
- the Pons Neronianus, over which victorious Emperors, celebrating their Triumphs, entered Rome;
- the Pons Probi, rebuilt by the emperor Theodosius I after a flood destroyed the previous bridge; and
- the Pons Aelius, built by the emperor Hadrian.

At the turn of the 5th century, the Regio was divided into 78 vici (districts) and 4,405 insulae (blocks). It had two curators and was served by 48 Roman magistrates.
