= Baths of Caracalla =

Ancient Roman bath, a landmark of Rome, Italy

- Thermae Antoninianae (Latin)
- Italian: Terme di Caracalla
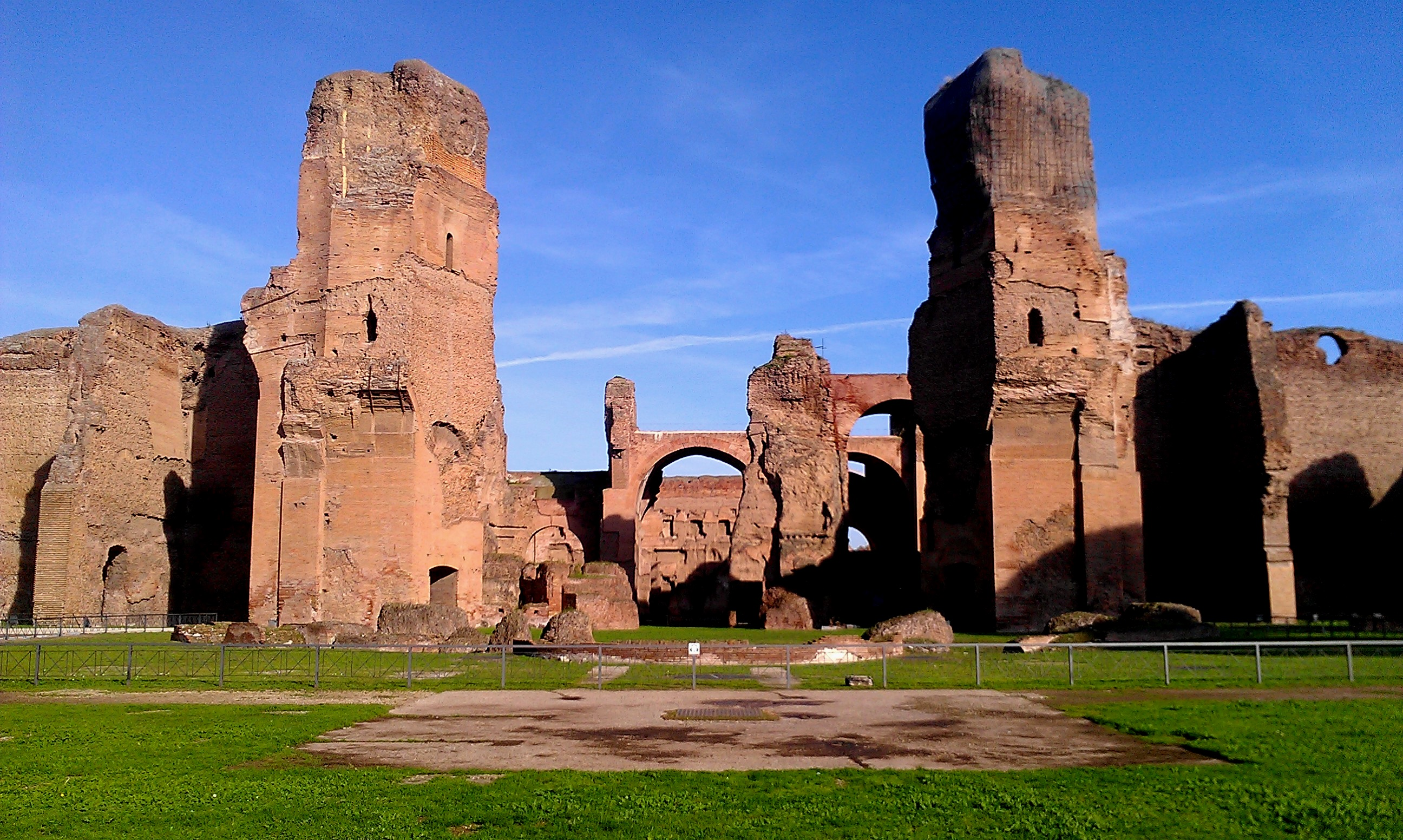
- The baths as viewed from the southwest. The caldarium would have been in the front of the image.

- The location of the baths in Rome during Antiquity
- Click on the map for a full-screen view
- 41°52′46″N 12°29′35″E
- Type: Thermae
- Periods: Imperial
- Location: Rome, Italy
- Region: Regio XII Piscina Publica
- Part of: Ancient Rome

History
- Built: probably 212–216/217 AD
- Built by: Caracalla
- Abandoned: circa 537 AD

Site notes
- Material: Marble, pozzolana, lime, tuff, basalt
- Height: 40 m (130 ft)
- Area: 100,000 m^{2} (1,100,000 sq ft)
- Volume: 8,000,000 L (1,800,000 imp gal; 2,100,000 US gal) (baths' waters)
- Architectural style: Ancient Roman
- Condition: in ruins
- Public access: Limited

UNESCO World Heritage Site
- Official name: Baths of Caracalla
- Type: Cultural, artistic, historical, architectural, religious
- Criteria: i, ii, iii, iv,
- Historic Centre of Rome...

The Baths of Caracalla (Italian: Terme di Caracalla) in Rome, Italy, were the city's second largest Roman public bath complex, or thermae, after the Baths of Diocletian. The baths were likely built between AD 212 (or 211) and 216/217, during the reigns of emperors Septimius Severus and Caracalla. They were in operation until the 530s and then fell into disuse and ruin.

Both during and since their operation as baths, they served as inspiration for many other notable buildings, ancient and modern, such as the Baths of Diocletian, the Basilica of Maxentius, the original Pennsylvania Station in New York City, Chicago Union Station and the Senate of Canada Building. Artworks recovered from the ruins include famous sculptures such as the Farnese Bull and the Farnese Hercules.

Today, the Baths of Caracalla are a tourist attraction.

== History ==
=== Construction ===
Construction of the baths was probably initiated by Emperor Septimius Severus and completed during the reign of his son, Caracalla. They were inaugurated in AD 216. The baths were located in the southern area of the city, Regio XII Piscina Publica, where members of the Severan family commissioned other construction works: the Via Nova leading to the baths and the Septizodium on nearby Palatine Hill. The site chosen for the baths formerly belonged to a vast garden estate known as the horti Asiniani, developed by Gaius Asinius Pollio during the reign of Augustus. The Farnese Bull sculptural group that was later moved into the Baths of Caracalla was already present at the site in the time of Pollio, who had imported it to display in his gardens.

Caracalla appropriated the estate of Pollio to build his baths; the existing structures were demolished in some cases to their ground floors, filled in with earth, and incorporated into the foundations of the new complex. The remains of one of these structures, a noble domus (house), were excavated initially by Francesco Ficoroni in the mid-18th century and again in 1860–1867 by G.B. Guidi. Recently this two-storey domus deep below the baths, built in 134–138 during the reign of Hadrian, and partially demolished in 206 has been opened to the public revealing lavishly decorated frescoed ceilings and a lararium, a room dedicated to Roman and Egyptian gods.

For work to have been mostly completed in the time of Caracalla, workers would have had to have installed over 2,000 tonnes (2,200 short tons) of material every day for six years.

Work on additional decorations continued under Caracalla's successors Elagabalus and Severus Alexander. The baths were likely mostly finished by 235. Later renovations were conducted under Aurelian (after a fire) and by Diocletian. Under Constantine the Great the caldarium was modified.

The building was heated by a hypocaust, a system of burning coal and wood underneath the ground to heat water provided by a dedicated aqueduct. The baths were free and open to the public.

=== Late antiquity ===
The baths were fully functional in the 5th century when they were referred to as one of the seven wonders of Rome. Olympiodorus of Thebes mentions a capacity of 1,600. This is interpreted to refer to the maximum number of simultaneous visitors, as the daily capacity is thought to have been 6,000 to 8,000 bathers.

The baths remained in use until the 6th century. In the mid-4th century, a Christian pilgrimage site came into being, known as the titulus Fasciolae, close to the baths near the Church of Santi Nereo e Achilleo. The baths thus became useful to pilgrims and the Church community for their water supply. In 537, during the Gothic War, King Vitiges of the Ostrogoths laid siege to Rome and severed the city's water supply. Shortly thereafter, the baths were abandoned. Located too far away from the still-populated area of Rome, the baths were mostly disused but in the 6th and 7th centuries were apparently used for the burials of pilgrims who died after being cared for in the nearby xenodochium of Santi Nereo e Achilleo. Some simple tombs from this era have been found inside the bath area.

Popes Adrian I, Sergius II, and Nicholas I may have had some work done on the aqueduct through the 9th century.

The earthquake of 847 destroyed much of the building, along with many other Roman structures.

=== Other uses ===
At least since the 12th century, the baths were used as a quarry for construction materials, and of decorative pieces to be reused in churches and palaces (e.g., in Pisa Cathedral and Santa Maria in Trastevere).

During the 14th century, the area was used for vineyards and gardens. In the 15th century, Pope Pius II used stone from the Baths in the construction of the Loggia of the Benediction at St. Peter's Basilica. In 1524, Pope Clement VII granted an excavation license to Cardinal Lorenzo Pucci to remove unlimited quantities of columns, marble, travertine and other ancient stone from the Baths of Caracalla for a new palace that the Cardinal was building near St. Peter's. In the mid-16th century, Clement's successor Pope Paul III had excavations conducted in the area during the construction of his new villa. Substantial architectural decoration remained standing at this time, as documented in the drawings of the Renaissance architects Andrea Palladio, Giovanni Antonio Dosio, and Antonio da Sangallo the Elder.

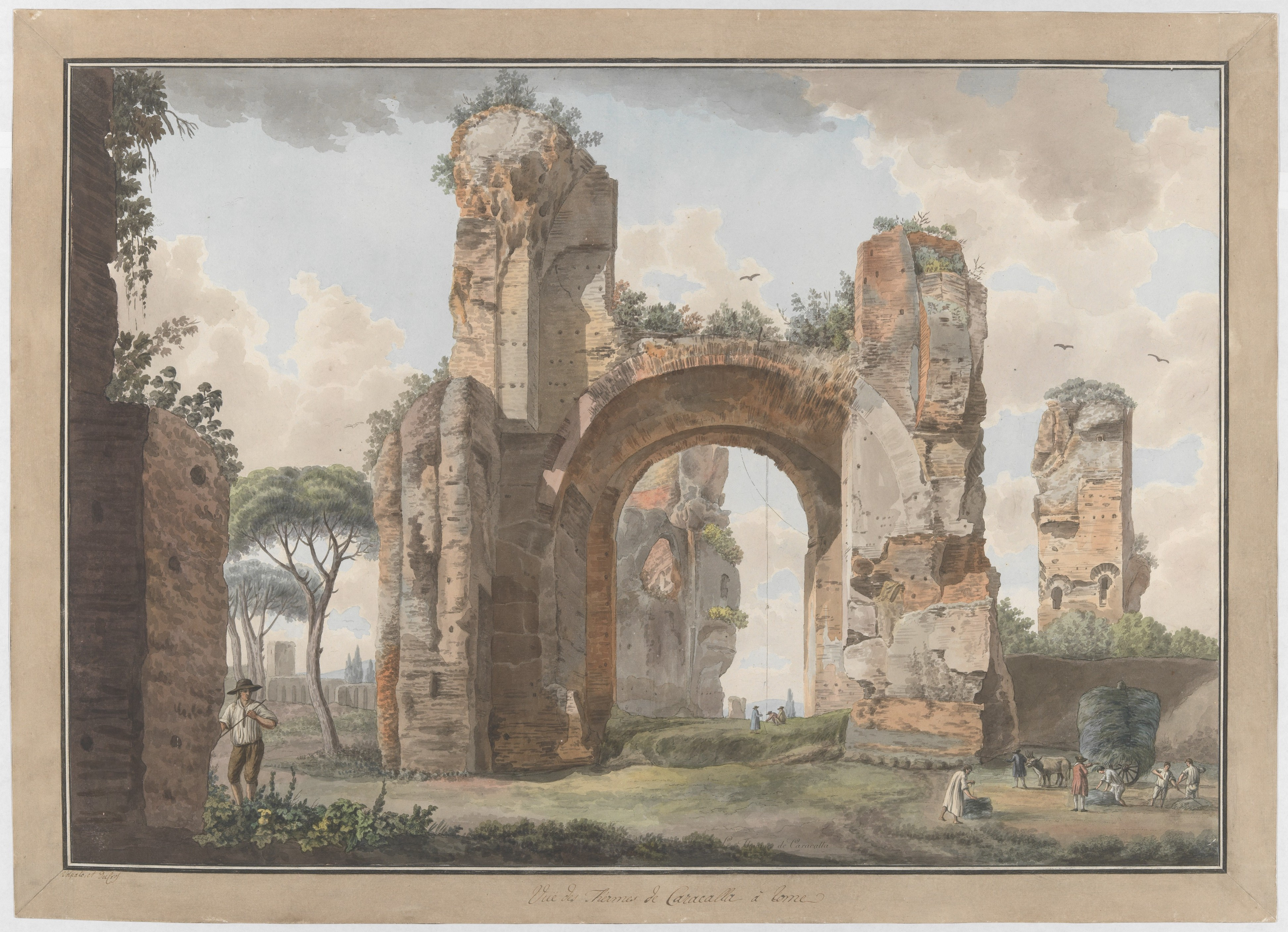
Engraving of the Baths of Caracalla by Abraham-Louis-Rodolphe Ducros, c. 1780

The excavations of Paul III between 1545 and 1547 uncovered many large statues made of marble and bronze, as well as innumerable architectural fragments, lamps, intaglios, and cameos. The quantity of materials was so great that a museum was created to house the collection, known as the Museo Farnese (relocated to the Real Museo Borbonico in the late 18th century). The Pope granted the area to the Roman Seminary of the Jesuits. It was used as a playground for children. Philip Neri may have brought children from his oratory here—he is believed to have commissioned the fresco Madonna supported by an angel still located in the natatio.

Between the 16th and 18th centuries, interest in the structure was rekindled, and several famous architects made drawings of the ruins (Andrea Palladio, Giovanni Battista Falda, Giambattista Nolli, and Giuliano da Sangallo).

The aqueduct serving the baths was in use up to the 19th century. The Aqua Antoniniana aqueduct, a branch of the earlier Aqua Marcia also worked on under Diocletian, was specifically built to serve the baths.

=== Excavation and restoration ===
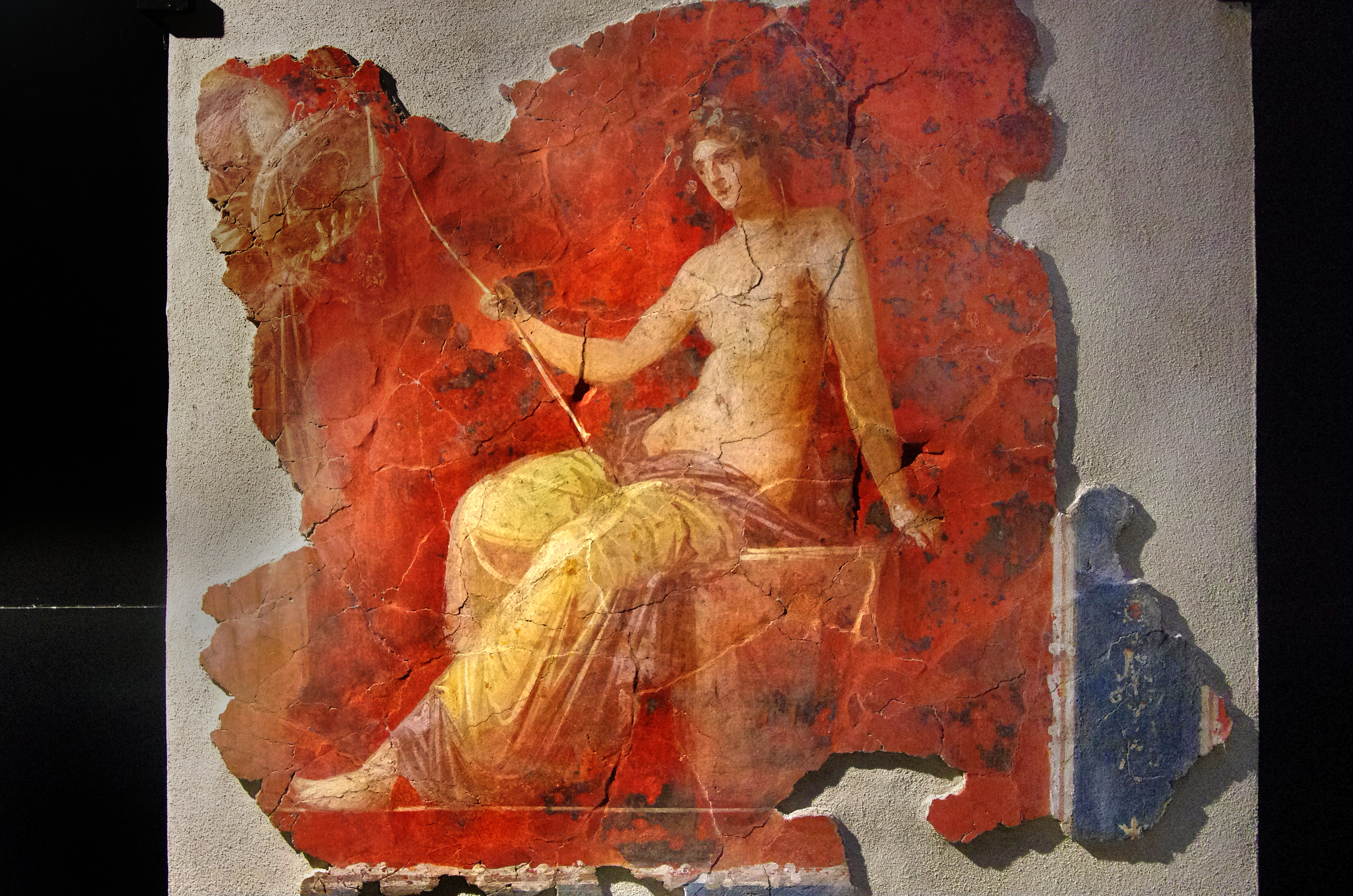
Fresco of Dionysus from triclinium ceiling of home incorporated into Baths of Caracalla (Rome)

In 1824, excavations at the baths were conducted by Count Egidio di Velo, whose findings included the mosaics now at the Vatican Museums. Further work followed by Luigi Canina in the frigidarium (until the mid-19th century) and then by Battista Guidi (1860–1867).

From 1866 to 1869, restoration work in the central part of the complex revealed a torso of Hercules, porphyry columns, and figure-adorned capitals. In 1870, the area became the property of the Italian government, and Pietro Rosa conducted excavations in the eastern palaestra. In 1878–79, Giuseppe Fiorelli discovered mosaics in the caldarium and western palaestra.

From the early 20th century, excavations expanded into the outer areas of the complex and downward, revealing the subterranean passages, including a Mithraeum (see below). Systematic work on the galleries, started in the 18th and 19th centuries, resumed after 1901. On the eastern side, more work was done in the late 1930s, when an opera stage was installed in the caldarium. Except for some sketches, no documentation of these restorations survives.

Further restoration work took place in the 1980s, when thick vegetation and illegally built houses in the area were cleared away. The southern wall with its cisterns, the southwestern library, and the octagonal hall known as the Temple of Jupiter were restored at that point. In 1998–9, the opera stage was dismantled, and modern visitor facilities were added to the baths. They reopened to the public in 2001.

The baths were the only archaeological site in Rome to be damaged by an earthquake near L'Aquila in 2009. They experienced minor damage in August 2016 from an earthquake in central Italy.

== Description ==
=== Overview ===
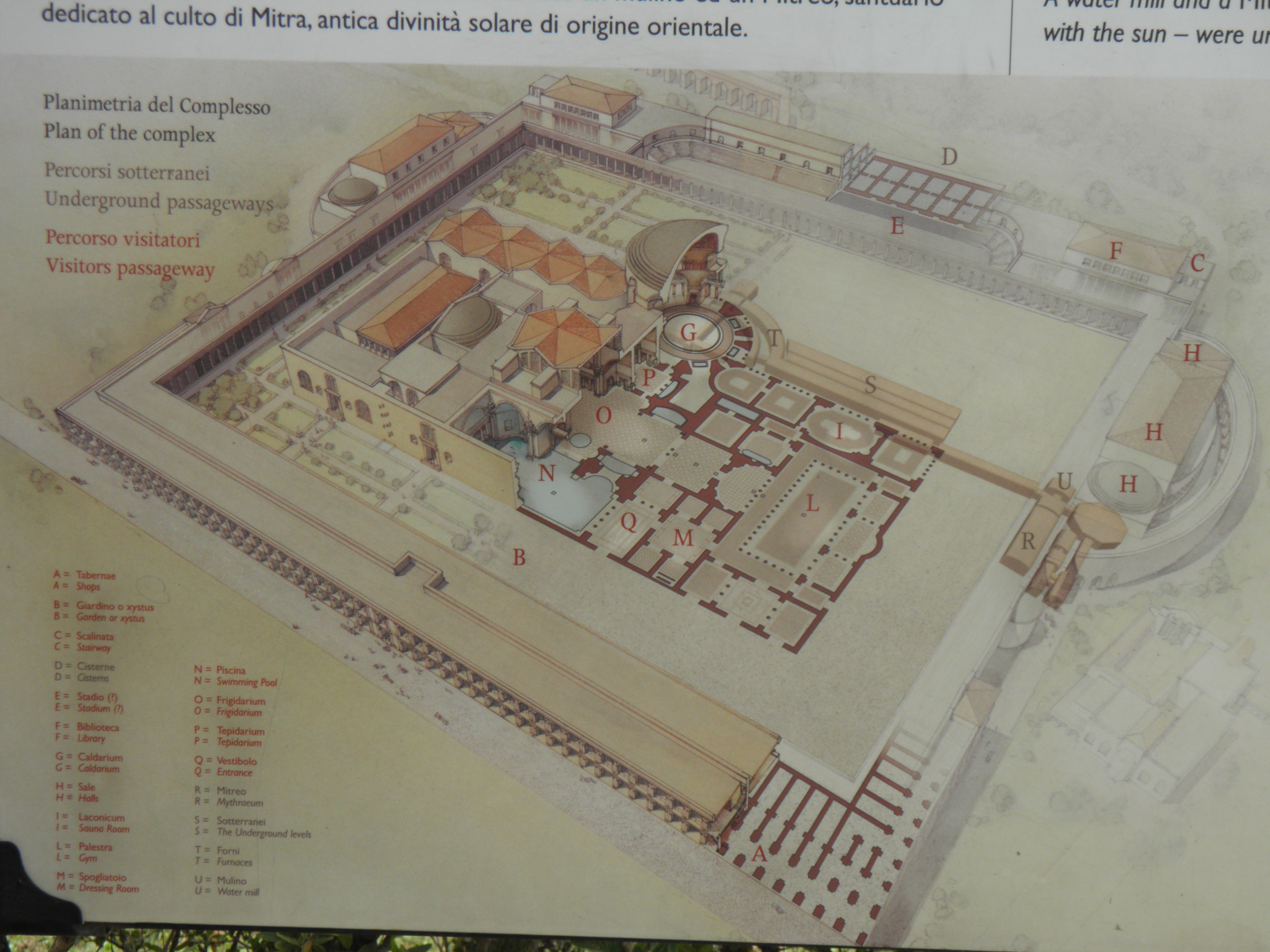
Overview plan

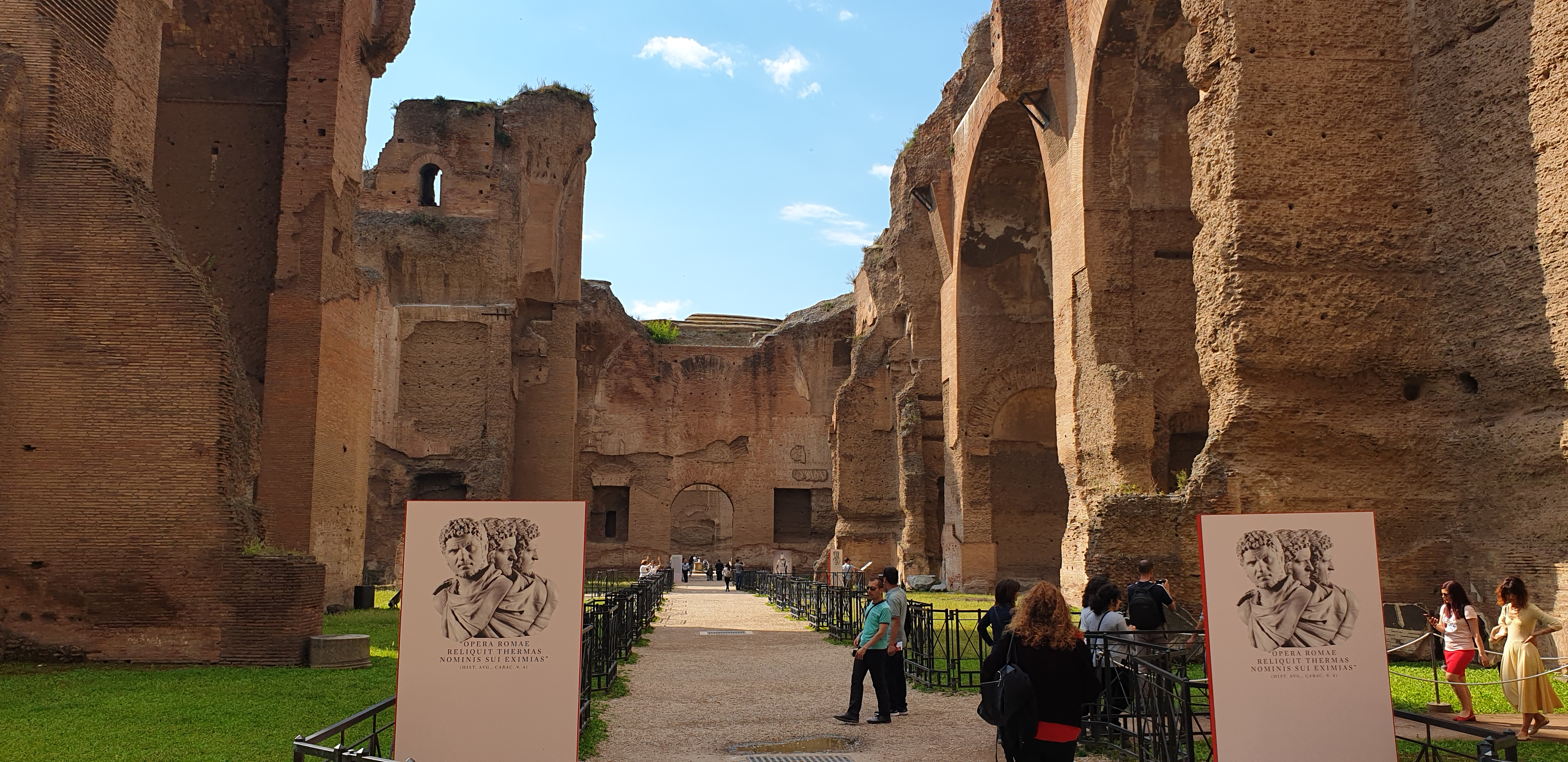
Part of the internal section

The bath complex covered approximately 25 hectares (62 acres). The complex is rectangular, measuring 337 m × 328 m. Its construction involved the moving of a substantial amount of earth, as parts of the nearby hills had to be removed or leveled into platforms. Several million bricks were used in the construction. The baths contained at least 252 columns, 16 of which had a height of over 12 m.

Water was carried to the baths by the then newly constructed Acqua Antoniniana from the major Acqua Marcia. The exact path of the aqueduct supplying the baths is not known, as only a few segments have been discovered. The aqueduct connected to the southern side of the baths, where it filled 18 cisterns. These, in turn, were connected by lead pipes with the baths proper.

The baths followed the "great Imperial baths" blueprint for Roman baths. They were more of a leisure centre than just a series of baths. Besides being used for bathing, the complex also offered facilities for taking walks, reading/studying, exercise, and body care. The main building stood in the centre with no connections to the surrounding walls, which housed the cisterns, two symmetrical libraries (south), two large exedras (east and west) and tabernae (shops) to the north. The surviving library measures 38 m × 22 m. Between the outer wall and the central complex were gardens (xystus).

The axis of the baths was laid out in a northeast to southwest fashion to make use of the sun's heat. The caldarium faced southwest, the frigidarium northeast. Overall, the bath area was arranged along a single linear axis. However, dressing rooms and palaestra were arranged symmetrically on both sides of the building, giving easier access and facilitating the flow of people in and out of the thermal area, thus increasing the number of potential users of the baths.

The bath main building was 214 m × 110 m and the height to the top of the roof line was 44 m (145 ft); it covered 2.6 hectares (6 1/2 acres) and could hold an estimated 1,600 bathers.

=== Interior ===
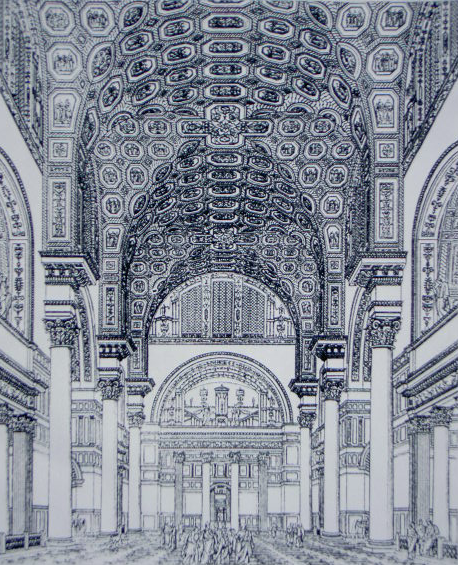
The Baths of Caracalla (reconstructive drawing from 1899)

The baths were the second to have a public library within the complex. Like other public libraries in Rome, there were two separate and equally sized rooms or buildings; one for Greek language texts and one for Latin language texts. The surviving library had three walls covered by niches (a total of 32) that housed the books. A larger niche in the middle of the southern wall likely contained a statue. A masonry ledge in front of the three other walls probably served as a bench. The floor is made from marble.

The baths consisted of a central frigidarium (cold room) measuring 58 m × 24 m (190 ft × 79 ft) under three groin vaults 32.9 m (108 ft) high, a double pool tepidarium (medium), and a circular caldarium (hot room) 35 m (115 ft) in diameter, as well as two palaestras (gyms where wrestling and boxing were practiced). The northeastern end of the bath building contained a natatio or swimming pool. The caldarium had seven pools, the frigidarium four, the tepidarium two. Next to the caldarium were saunas (laconica).

The central room was the frigidarium, whose high roof was supported by eight giant columns made from Egyptian granite. Walls and floor were made from marble. The hall served a dual purpose: It was a meeting place and transition area for visitors heading for other parts of the bath. It also housed the cold baths, in the form of four pools, two of which were connected to the tepidarium and two of which communicated with the natatio via some waterfalls. In the middle of the frigidarium was another circular pool (now at the Archaeological Museum at Naples) surrounding a fountain. Two additional brick pools flanked it.

The caldarium was a circular room with marble floors and topped by a dome of almost 36 m diameter, close to the size of the Pantheon's dome. Just eight masonry pillars carried the weight of the dome. Between them were glass windows that helped heat the large room (and reduced the weight of the walls). Its seven pools measured 9.5 m × 5 m (depth of 1 m). Only six of these remain. A small apse replaced the seventh during the restoration by Constantine.

The Olympic-sized natatio pool measured 50 m × 22 m. The walls rose to more than 20 m, and the northern façade was structured by three huge columns made from grey granite. Between those columns were niches on several levels that housed ornamental statues.

The natatio was roofless with bronze mirrors mounted overhead to direct sunlight into the pool area. The entire bath building was on a raised platform 6 m (20 ft) high to allow for storage and furnaces under the building.

=== Subterranean features ===
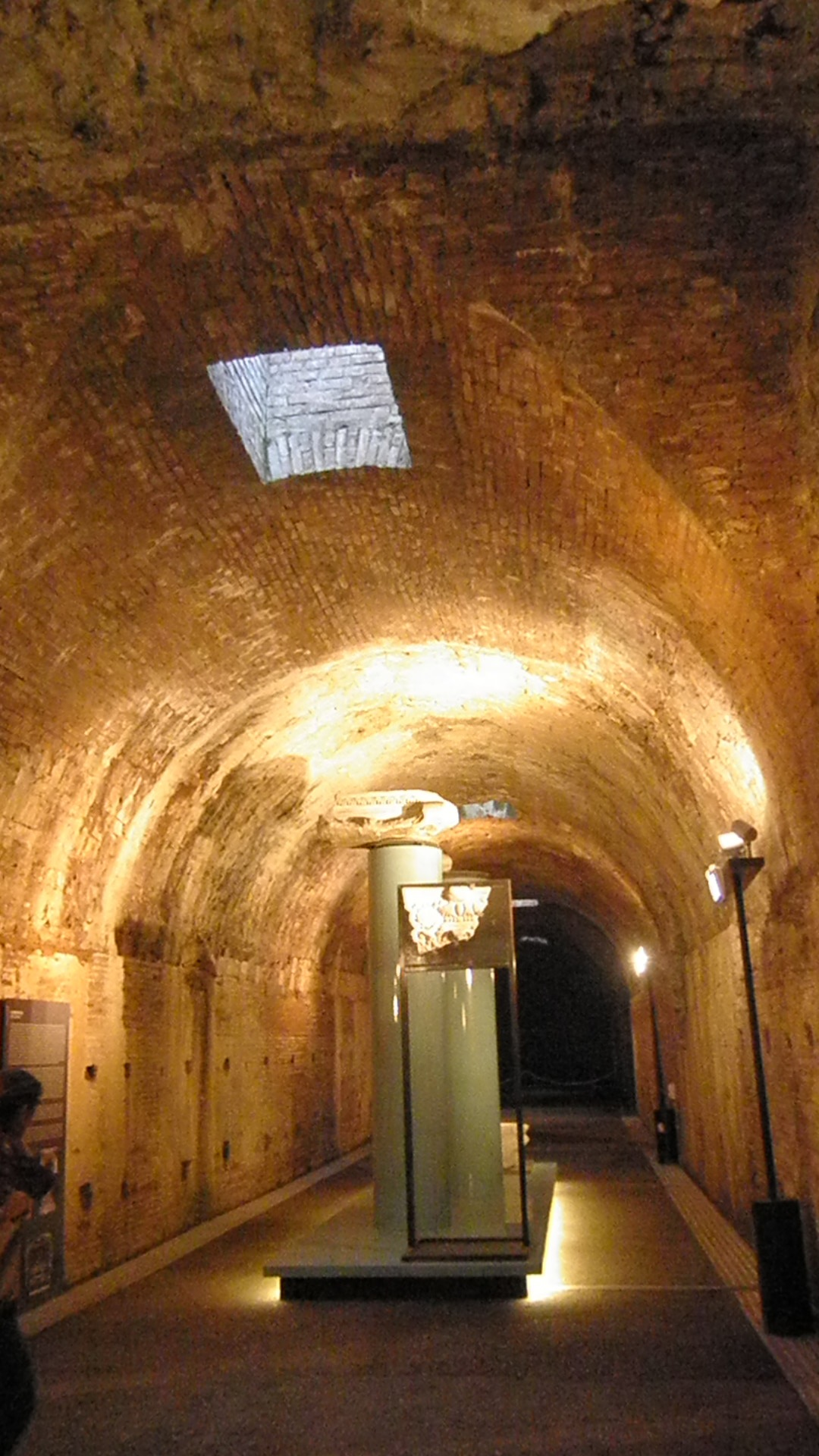
Tunnel with skylight

Discovered in 1912 by Ettore Ghislanzoni, the Mithraeum at the baths is considered the largest documented gathering space for the worshippers of Mithra, the Persian god in vogue with the military and mostly lower-class men, in the 2nd and 3rd centuries AD. The mithraeum was approximately 23 m (75 ft) long and 10 m (33 ft) wide with a cross-vaulted ceiling. It can be only roughly dated by the two main events associated with the baths: the mithraeum was created after the complex was completed circa AD 217, and it was probably no longer in use when the aqueduct supplying the complex was cut in the 530s.

The floor of the main room was covered with a black and white mosaic. Benches lined the walls. A fresco portraying Mithra (or a torch bearer) is on the western wall. The only other ornamentation was a marble block, roughly carved into the shape of a snake. On the floor near the entrance, a circular pit was found covered with a marble slab, with a terracotta bowl containing the remains of wheat stalks. A rectangular hole in the floor gives access to a small tunnel that runs under the center of the main hall into an adjoining room, where there is an entrance/exit with a staircase. This, a unique feature in a mithraeum, has been controversial. Most scholars view this as a fossa sanguinis, a ritual pit over which the bull at the center of the Mithraic mythology was slaughtered, bathing one or more initiates in its blood. Others think it was used as a sort of stage trap door, allowing a person to stage a surprising entry into the room.

In a nearby room, a statue of Aphrodite Anadyomene was found in 1912. It is now located in the Museo Nazionale Romano at the Baths of Diocletian.

Apart from housing the mithraeum, the tunnels served to heat the baths and as sewers for the outflow of water. They were also used to store the fuel for the furnaces, which are estimated to have burned around 10 tons of wood per day. Storage capacity had been estimated at more than 2,000 t of wood.

Overall, these tunnels ran for hundreds of metres underneath the main structure. They were lit by skylight-type windows that allowed the air to circulate, thus keeping the stored wood from rotting.

An underground water mill was excavated beginning in 1912. First thought to be medieval in origin, it is now considered to date to Antiquity. It may have been a part of the original workings of the baths. Fire damage indicates it was burned in the 3rd century, but rebuilt with some alterations.

=== Dimensions ===
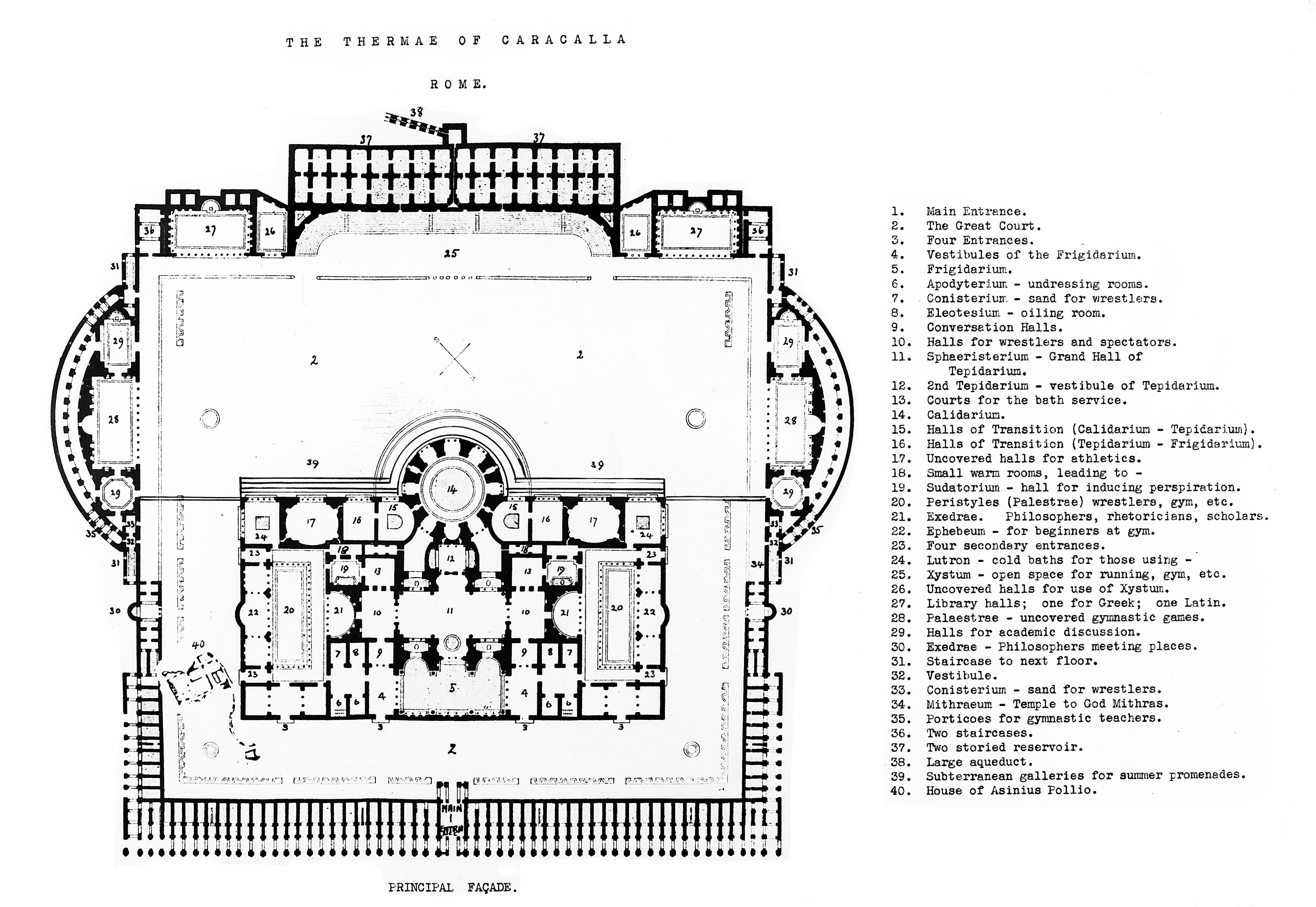
Plans of the baths (more here )

==== Principal dimensions ====
- Precinct maximum: 412 m × 393 m (1,352 ft × 1,289 ft)
- Internal: 337 m × 328 m (1,106 ft × 1,076 ft)
- Central Block overall: 214 m × 110 m (702 ft × 361 ft)
- Natatio (swimming pool): 54 m × 23 m (177 ft × 75 ft)
- Frigidarium: 59 m × 24 m (194 ft × 79 ft), height of 41 m (135 ft)
- Caldarium: 35 m (115 ft), height of 44 m (144 ft)
- Internal courts: 67 m × 29 m (220 ft × 95 ft)

==== Quantities of materials ====
- Pozzolana: 341,000 m^{3} (12,000,000 cu ft)
- Quick lime: 35,000 m^{3} (1,200,000 cu ft)
- Tuff: 341,000 m^{3} (12,000,000 cu ft)
- Basalt for foundations: 150,000 m^{3} (5,300,000 cu ft)
- Brick pieces for facing: 17.5 million
- Large Bricks: 520,000
- Marble columns in Central block: 252
- Marble for columns and decorations: 6,300 m^{3} (220,000 cu ft)

==== Estimated average labour figures on site ====
- Excavation: 5,200 men
- Substructure: 9,500 men
- Central Block: 4,500 men
- Decoration: 1,800 men

The 12 m (39 ft) columns of the frigidarium were made of granite and they weighed close to 100 t (98 long tons; 110 short tons).

== Works of art ==
The baths were originally ornamented with high-quality sculptures, estimated to have numbered more than 120. Despite their location in one of the city's working-class areas, of all the antique baths in Rome, the Baths of Caracalla were found to have contained the most lavish assortment of statues. Although many were destroyed in the Middle Ages to make lime, beginning in the 16th century under Pope Paul III Farnese, sculptures were excavated from the area to serve as decorations in newly built palazzi.

Among the well-known pieces recovered from the Baths of Caracalla are the Farnese Bull (probably from the eastern palaestra) and Farnese Hercules (from the frigidarium), now in the Museo Archeologico Nazionale, Naples; others are in the Museo di Capodimonte there. One of the many statues is the colossal 4 m (13 ft) statue of Asclepius.

Two granite tubs from the frigidarium were taken to Piazza Farnese, where they still serve as fountains, made by Girolamo Rainaldi. A granite column from the natatio was taken to Florence by Cosimo I de' Medici in Piazza Santa Trinita. It is now known as the Column of Justice. In the Lateran Collection of the Vatican Museums are mosaics composed of rectangular panels depicting athletes, which were discovered in 1824 in two of the library exedrae to the east and west of the baths complex. They have been restored and are on display in the Gregoriano Profano Museum.

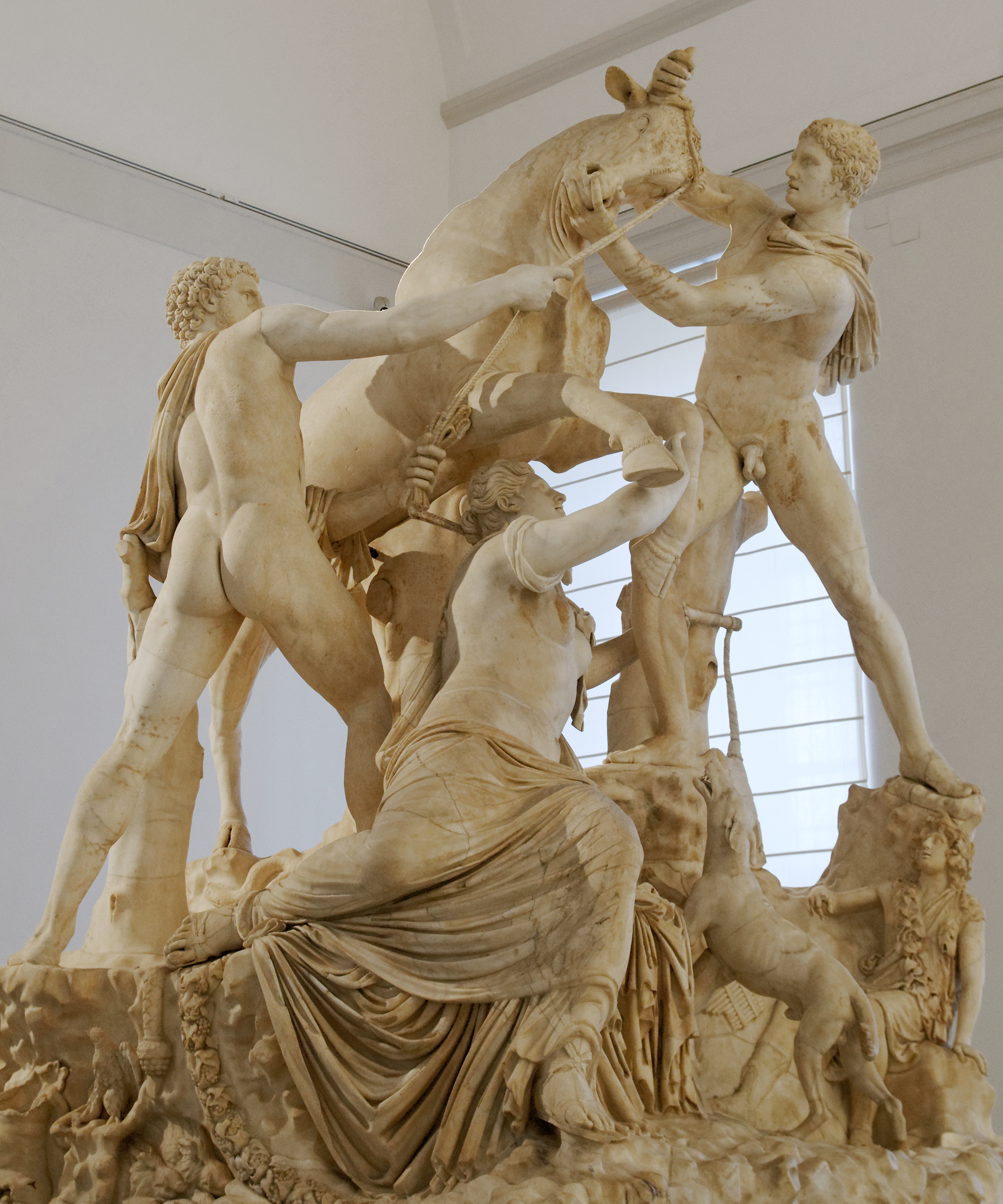
The Farnese Bull, now at Naples

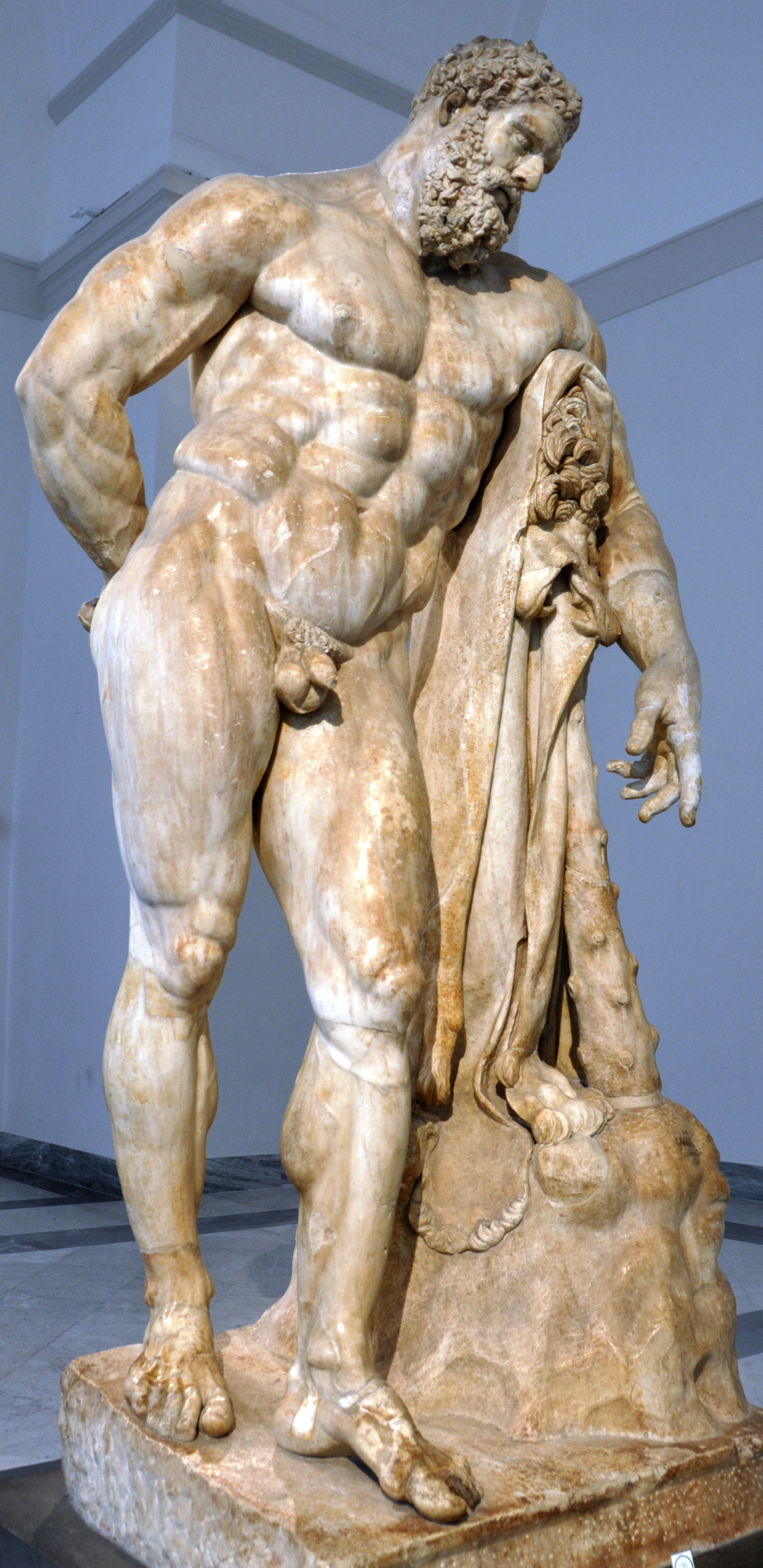
One of the statues that adorned the baths was the Farnese Hercules, now at Naples

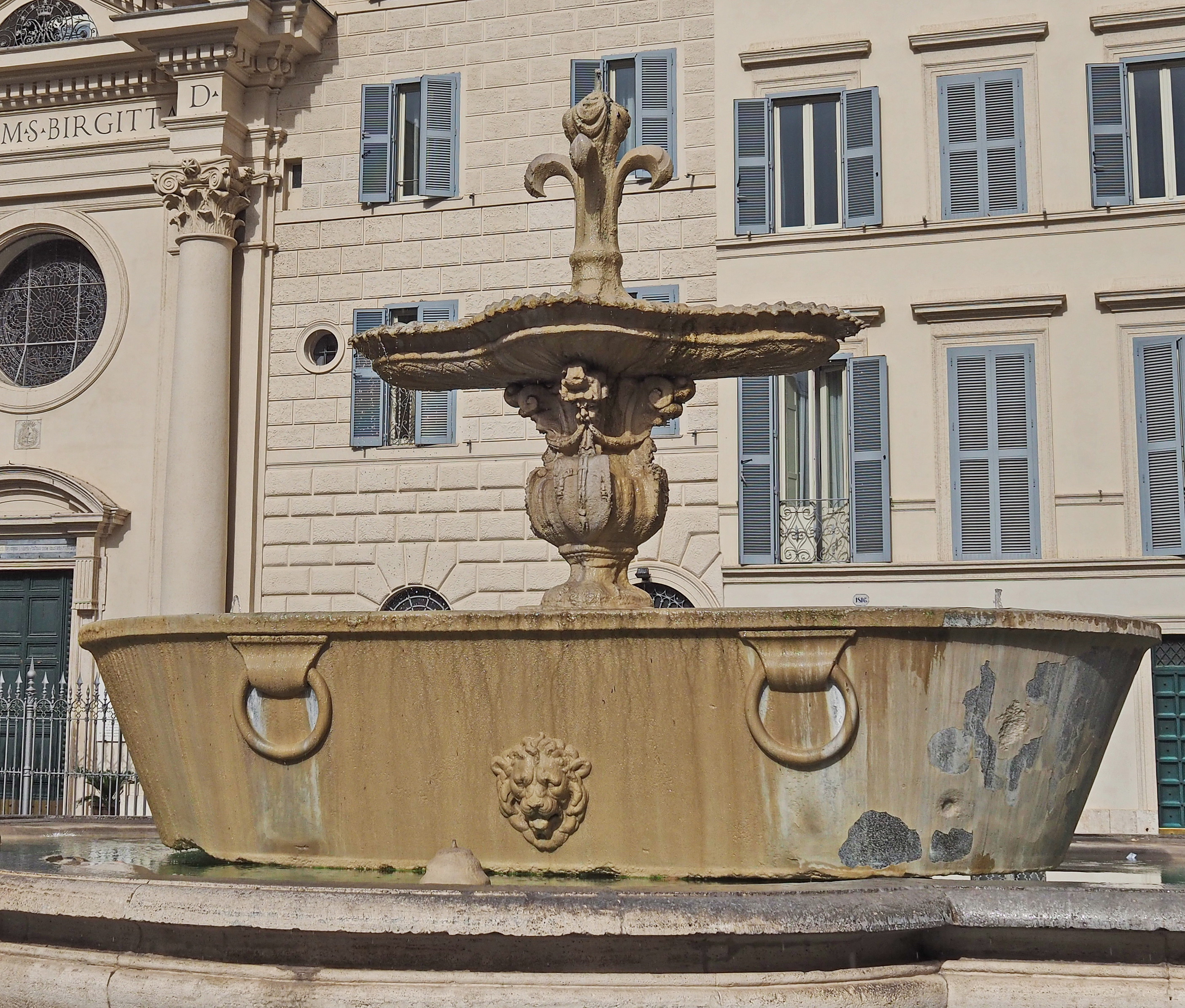
One of two granite basins from the Baths of Caracalla repurposed as a fountain in the Piazza Farnese

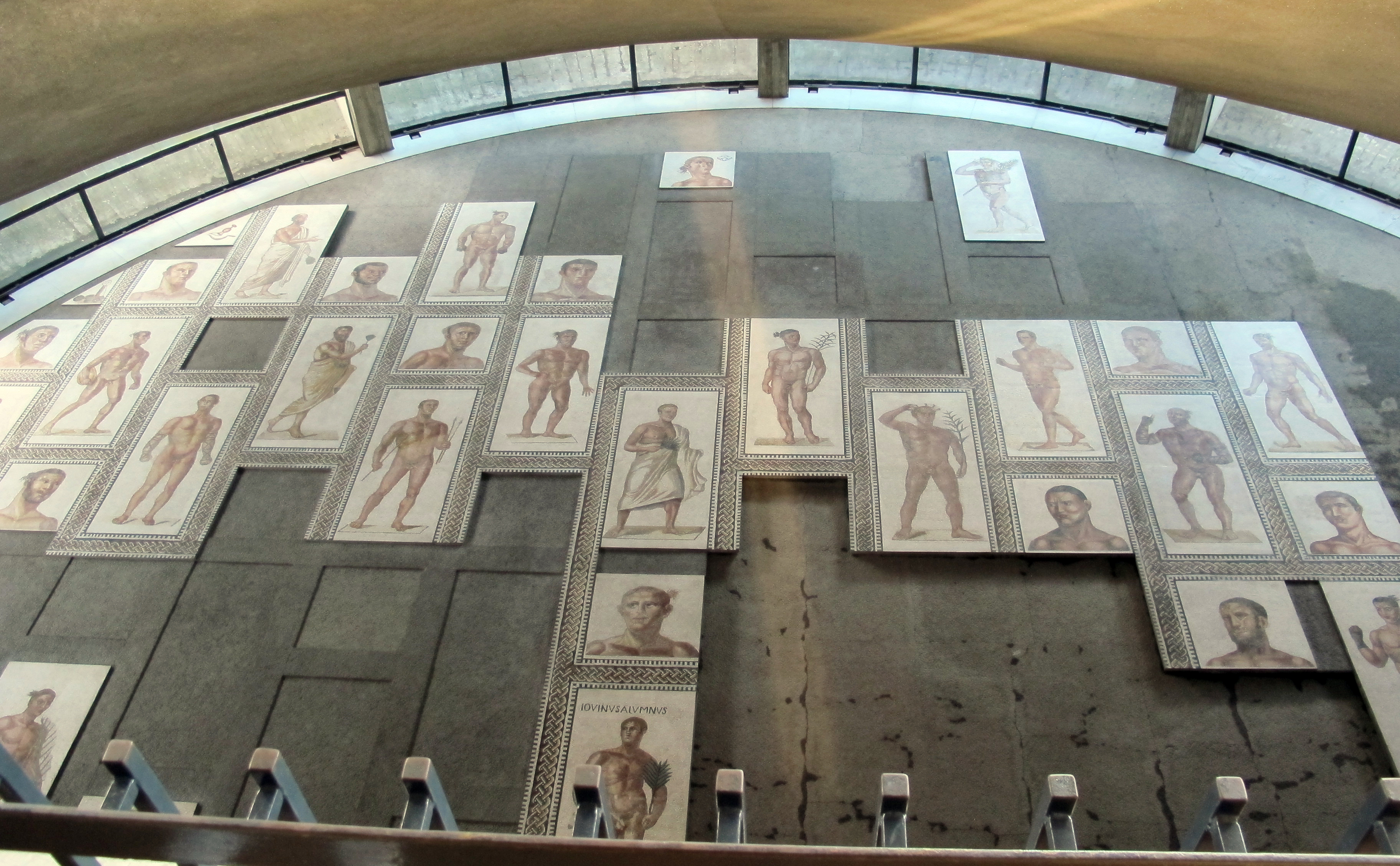
Mosaics of athletes c. 4th century AD from the baths, displayed in the Vatican Museums

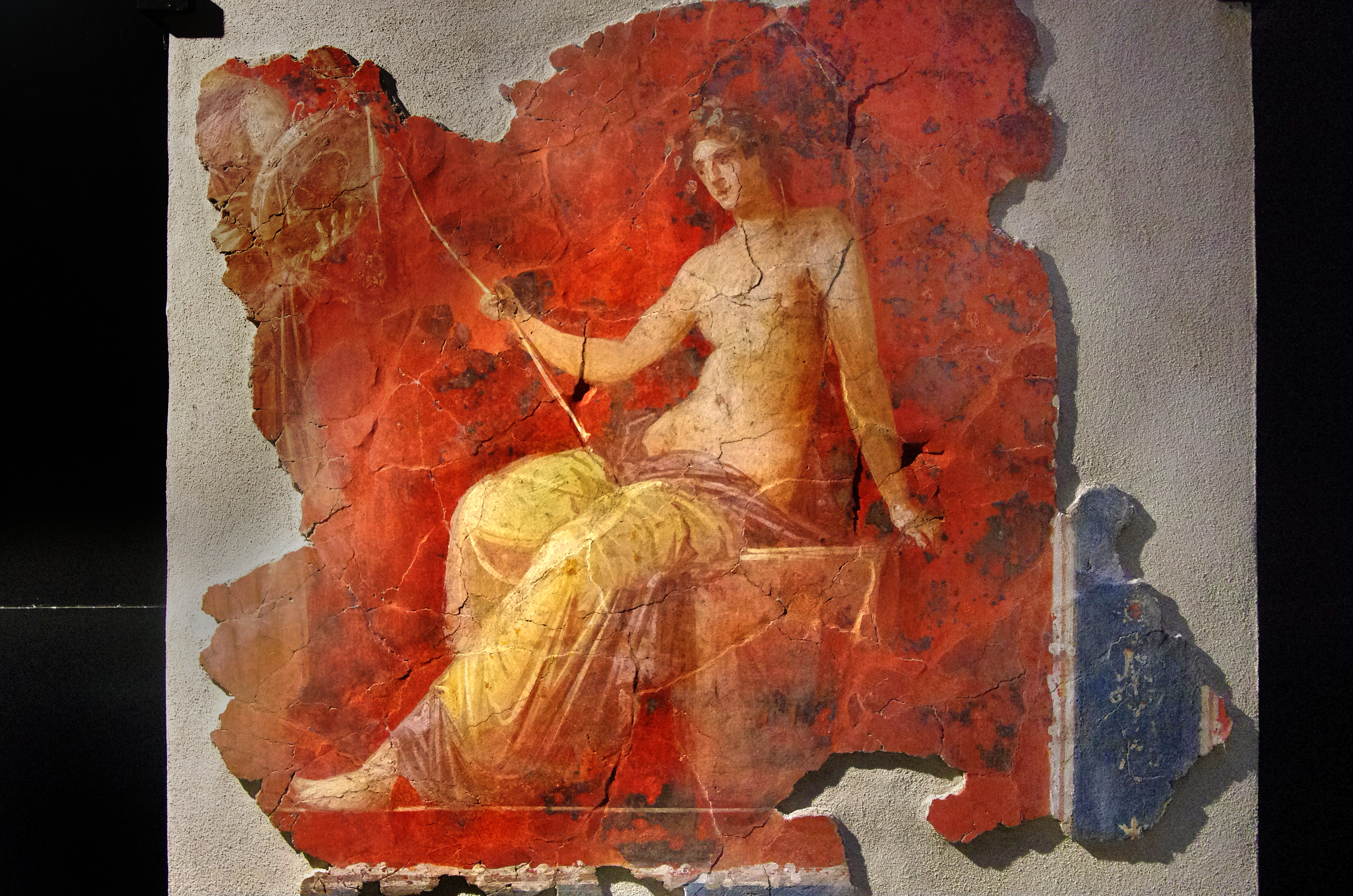
Fresco of Dionysus from triclinium ceiling of home incorporated into Baths of Caracalla

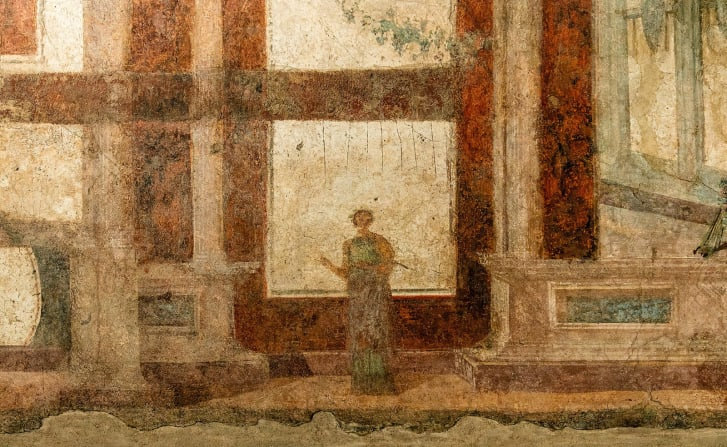
Fresco detail of a human figure

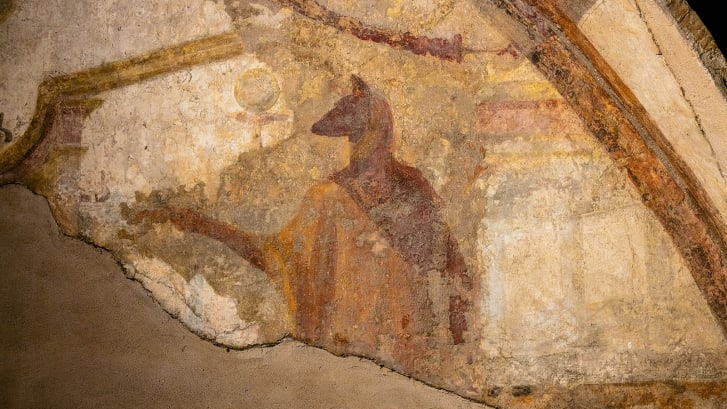
Fresco of Anubis, the Egyptian god of death and the afterlife

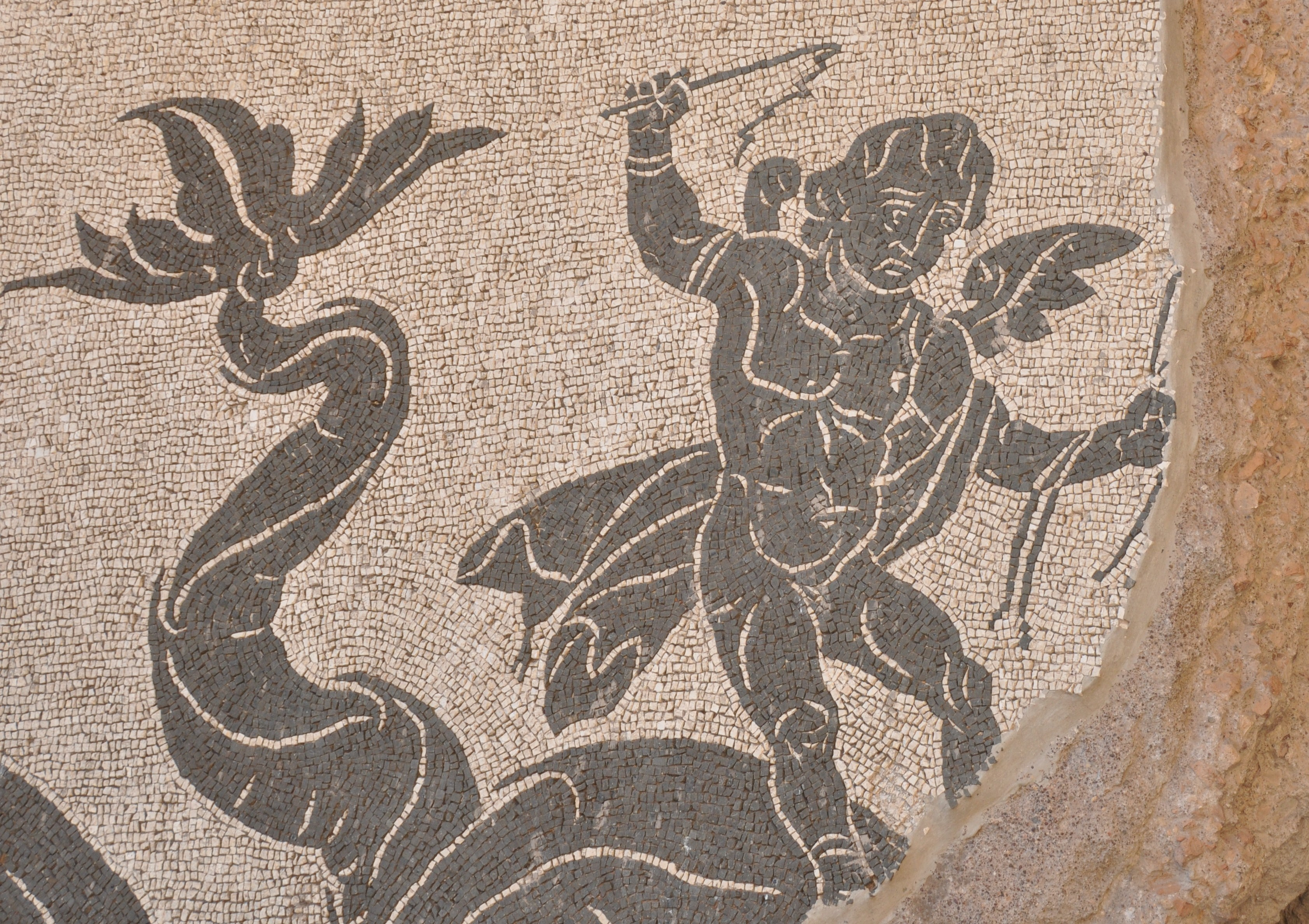
Fragment of a mythological mosaic

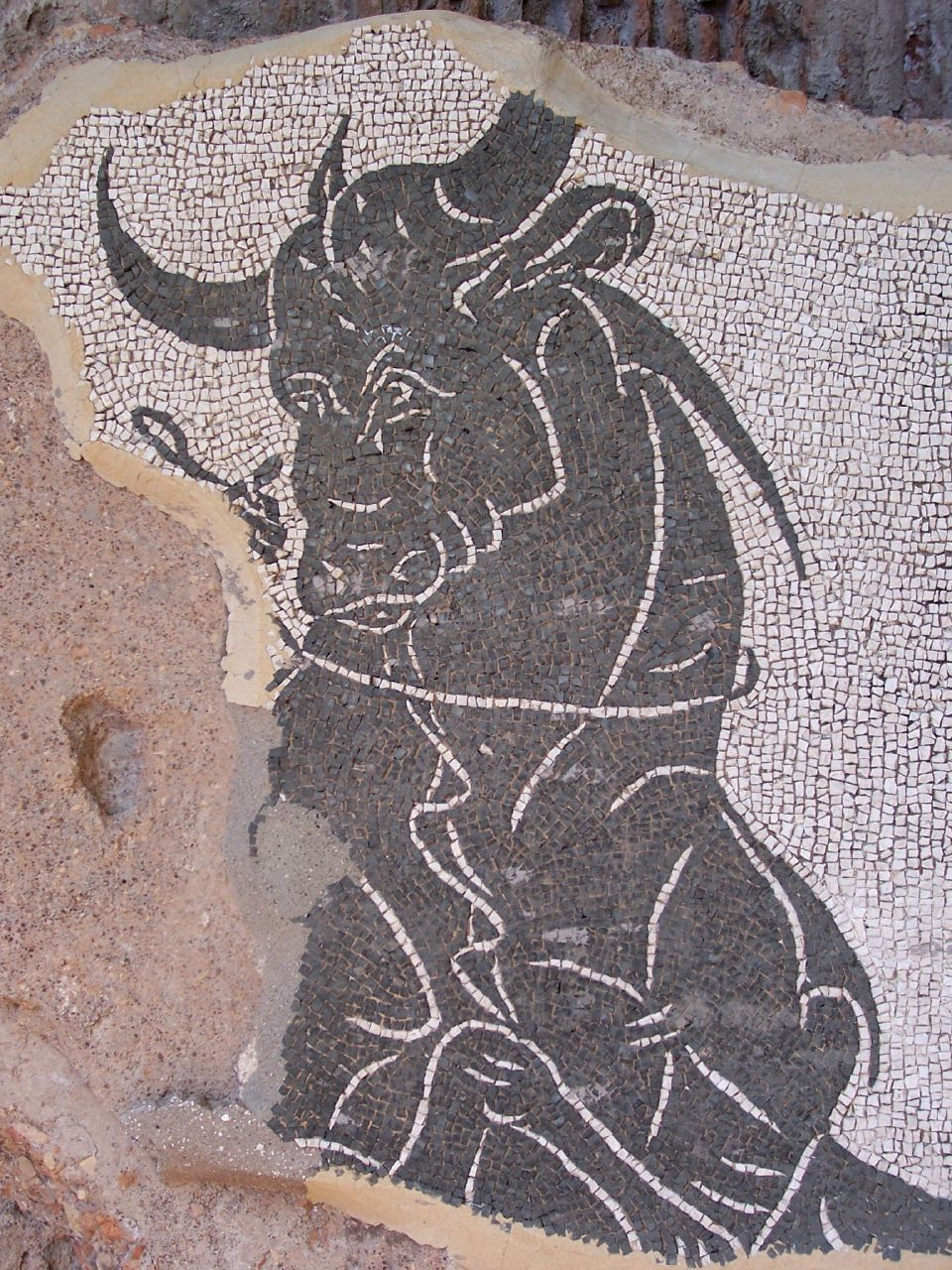
Mosaic depicting a bull

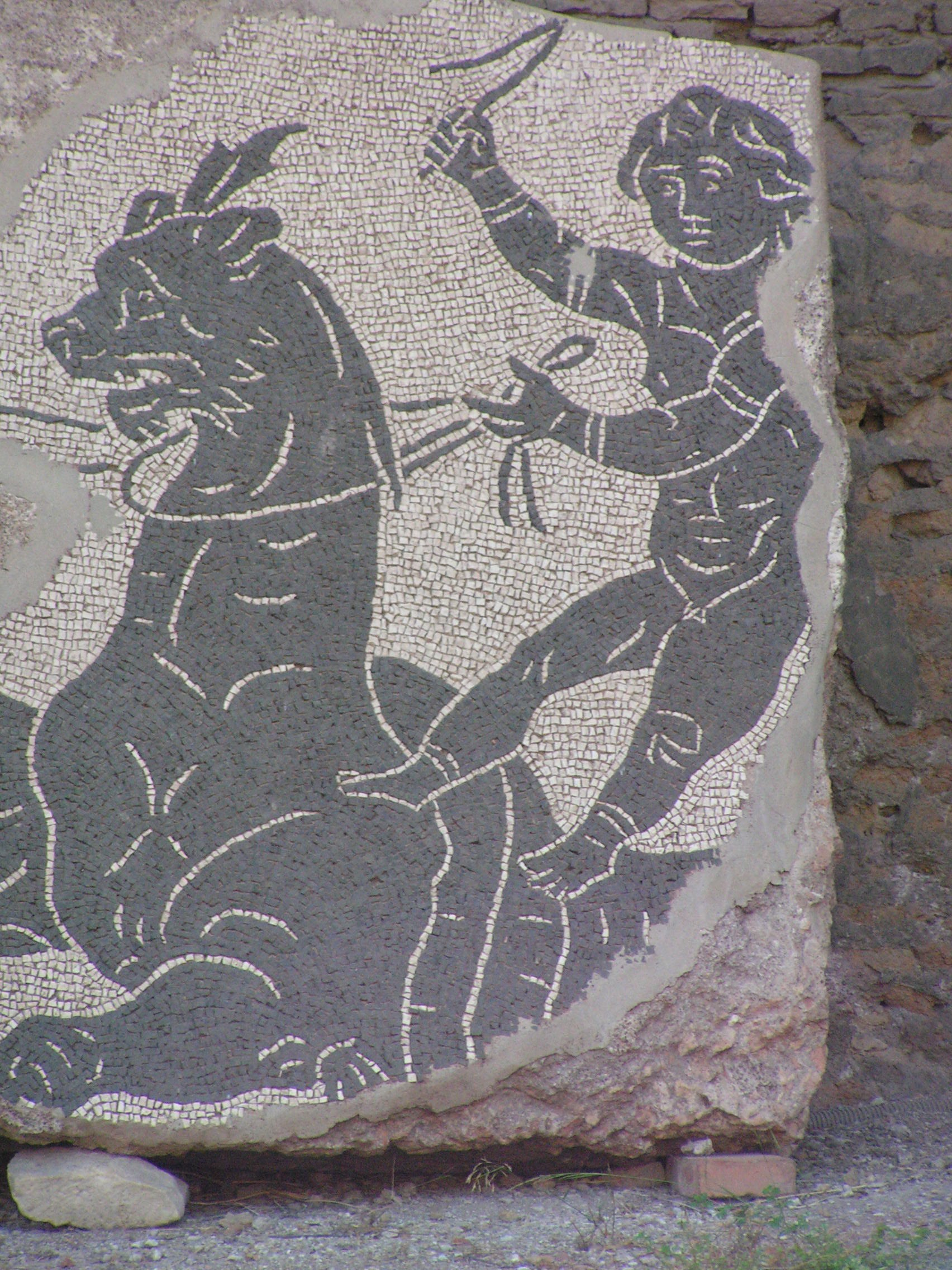
Mosaic with mythological creature

== Cultural impact ==
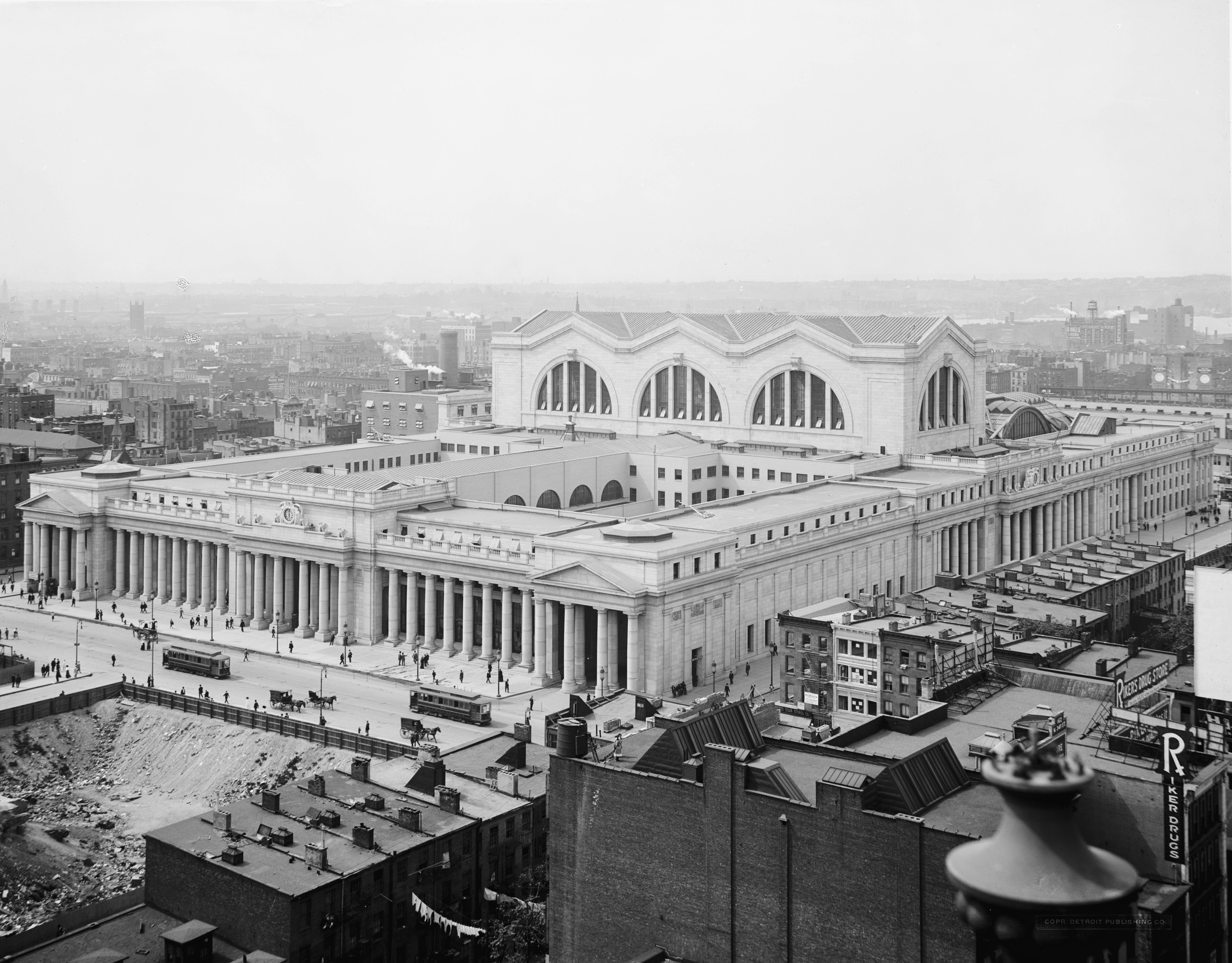
The original Pennsylvania Station, New York City (1910)

The Baths of Caracalla (and especially the central frigidarium) had a significant impact on the architecture of many later buildings. In Roman times, these included the Baths of Diocletian and the Basilica of Maxentius.

In the 19th and early 20th century, the design of the baths was used as the inspiration for several modern structures, including St George's Hall in Liverpool, the original Pennsylvania Station (demolished in 1963) in New York City, the current Senate of Canada Building in Ottawa, the interior of the Hollywood Theatre in Portland, and the main hall of the University of Leipzig (demolished in 1968).

The main halls of Penn Station, the Senate of Canada Building, and Chicago Union Station made use of direct copies of the frigidarium's architecture.

== Use as a cultural venue ==
=== Opera and concerts ===
The central part of the bath complex (the caldarium) was the summer home of the Rome Opera company from 1937 to 1993. In 2001, use of the venue by the opera resumed, but it now uses a temporary movable stage outside of the main structure, which reduces the stress on the antique ruins.

It is also a concert venue, having achieved fame as the venue and backdrop for the first Three Tenors concert in 1990.

=== Sporting ===
The area was used for the Rome Grand Prix four times between 1947 and 1951.

At the 1960 Summer Olympics, the venue hosted the gymnastics events.

=== Film ===
The baths were used as a filming location for John Wick: Chapter 2.

The baths feature prominently in La Dolce Vita.

== Visiting ==
The extensive ruins of the baths have become a popular tourist attraction. The baths are open to the public for an admission fee. Access is limited to certain areas/walkways to avoid additional damage to the mosaic floors.

== See also ==
- Baths of Diocletian – Ancient Roman bath in Rome, Italy
- List of Roman public baths

Preceded by Baths of Agrippa	Landmarks of Rome; Baths of Caracalla	Succeeded by Baths of Diocletian
