= Castra of ancient Rome =

Castra of Ancient Rome
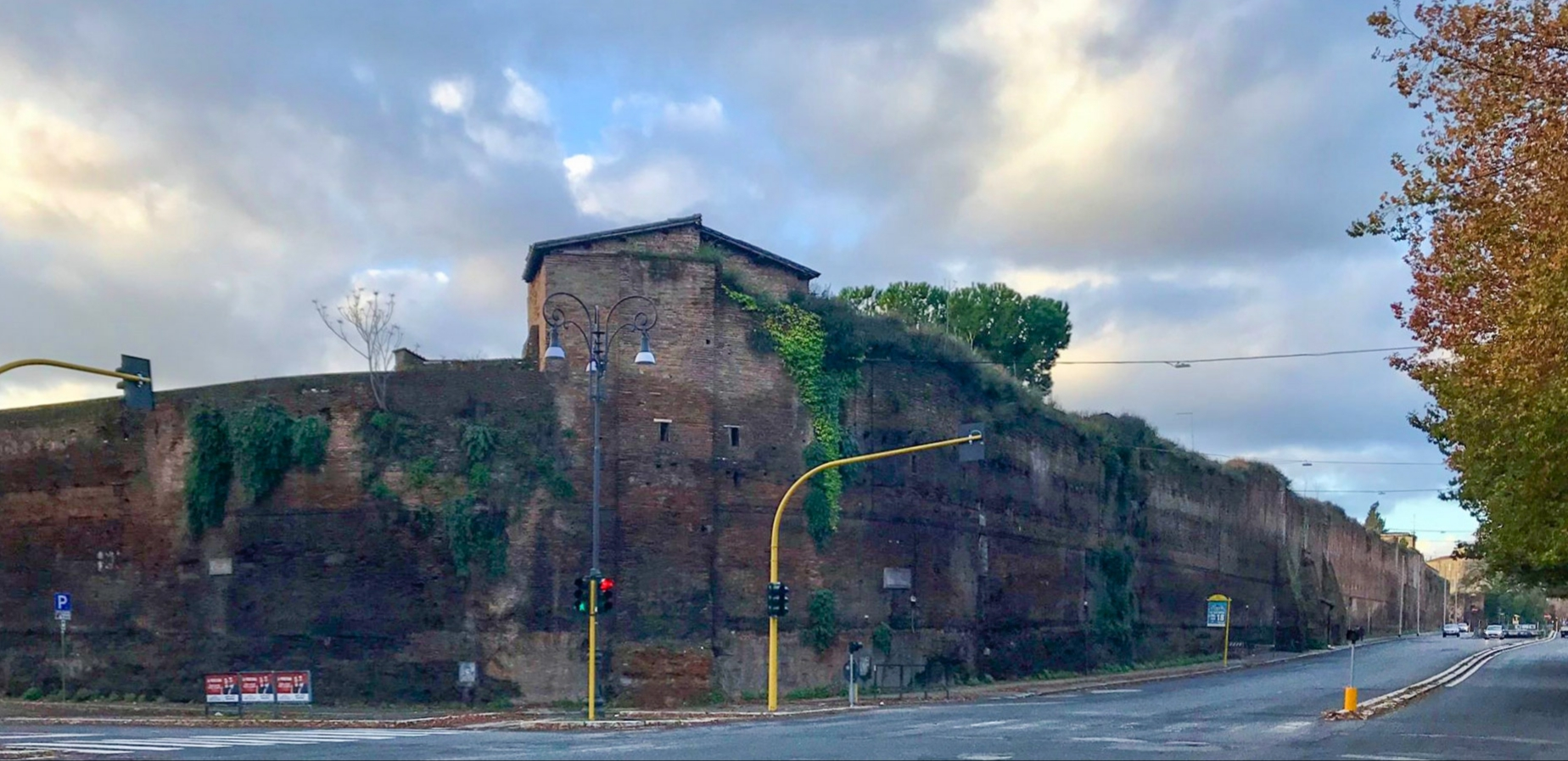
- Northwest corner of the Castra Praetoria rampart.
- Interactive map of Castra of Ancient Rome
- Periods: from the age of Tiberius until 4th century
- Cultures: Roman
- Associated with: Praetorian Guard, Cohortes urbanae, Equites singulares Augusti, classiarii of Classis Misenensis, Speculatores and Frumentarii.
- Location: Rome, Italy

The castra (or forts) of ancient Rome represent the complex of camps (or barracks) that housed the various military corps located in the city of Rome.

== Castra Praetoria ==
The Praetorians were the main body of the imperial guard. Established under Augustus between 29 and 20 BC, they had great influence in the history of the Empire, until their dissolution under Constantine I.

The barracks was built between 20 and 23 AD by Tiberius on the advice of the powerful commander (Praefectus Praetorio, literally "Prefect to the Praetorium", given that the Latin verb praeficio takes the dative case) Sejanus, to house in it the nine existing cohorts.

The castra had a quadrangular perimeter, with rounded corners and an oblique southern side. Three sides and traces of the fourth western side are still preserved. The enclosure of the castra was incorporated into the city walls built by Emperor Aurelian in the second half of the 3rd century.

The Castra Praetoria give the name to the Rione Castro Pretorio.

== Castra urbana ==
Three permanent urban cohorts, established by Augustus and reorganized by Tiberius, constituted the body in charge of maintaining public order in the city; they were under the command of Praefectus urbi (also in this case the term Praefectus takes the dative urbi, so the literal translation of the expression is "Prefect to the town").

Probably at the beginning they were also housed in the Castra Praetoria, since during the emergencies they were used as auxiliary troops of the praetorian cohorts for the defense of the Emperor. Later, starting at least from the time of the Emperor Septimius Severus, they had their own barracks: we know from sources that it was in the VII Augustan region (Via Lata), probably in the area of Piazza di Spagna.

== Castra equitum singularium ==
The body of the Equites singulares was part of the guard of the Emperors and was composed of soldiers of barbarian origins; it was probably established by the Emperor Trajan and suppressed by Constantine I.

The body had two barracks. The remains of the oldest one (castra priora equitum singularium) were found in 1885-1889 on the Celian Hill (Via Tasso), together with numerous inscriptions with dedications to different deities, that were probably housed in the sanctuary of the barracks.

The second barracks (Castra Nova equitum singularium) was built under the Emperor Septimius Severus between 193 and 197 (as attested by some dedicatory inscriptions) in an area formerly occupied by private houses (domus Lateranorum) near the Lateran. When the body was suppressed by Constantine I, the castra nova were burnt down and the basilica dedicated to the Savior ((later the Basilica of St. John Lateran) was built in their place. The remains of the Severian buildings were found on several occasions under the church.

The body also had a burial ground on Via Labicana (in the locality called ad Duas Lauros), where numerous inscriptions mentioning the two barracks have been found. Many of the sepulchral epigraphs of this burial ground were later reused as construction material for the circular church of Saints Marcellinus and Peter ad Duas Lauros.

== Castra misenatium ==
A special detail of the sailors (classiarii) of the military fleet stationed in Miseno was used to maneuver the velarium, which protected the spectators of the Colosseum from the sun and rain, and probably also for the naumachiae.

The detail was housed in a barracks near the amphitheater, probably close to the Baths of Trajan, on the slopes of the Oppian Hill, where an inscription was found relating to an enlargement of the barracks in the 3rd century.

== Castra Peregrina ==
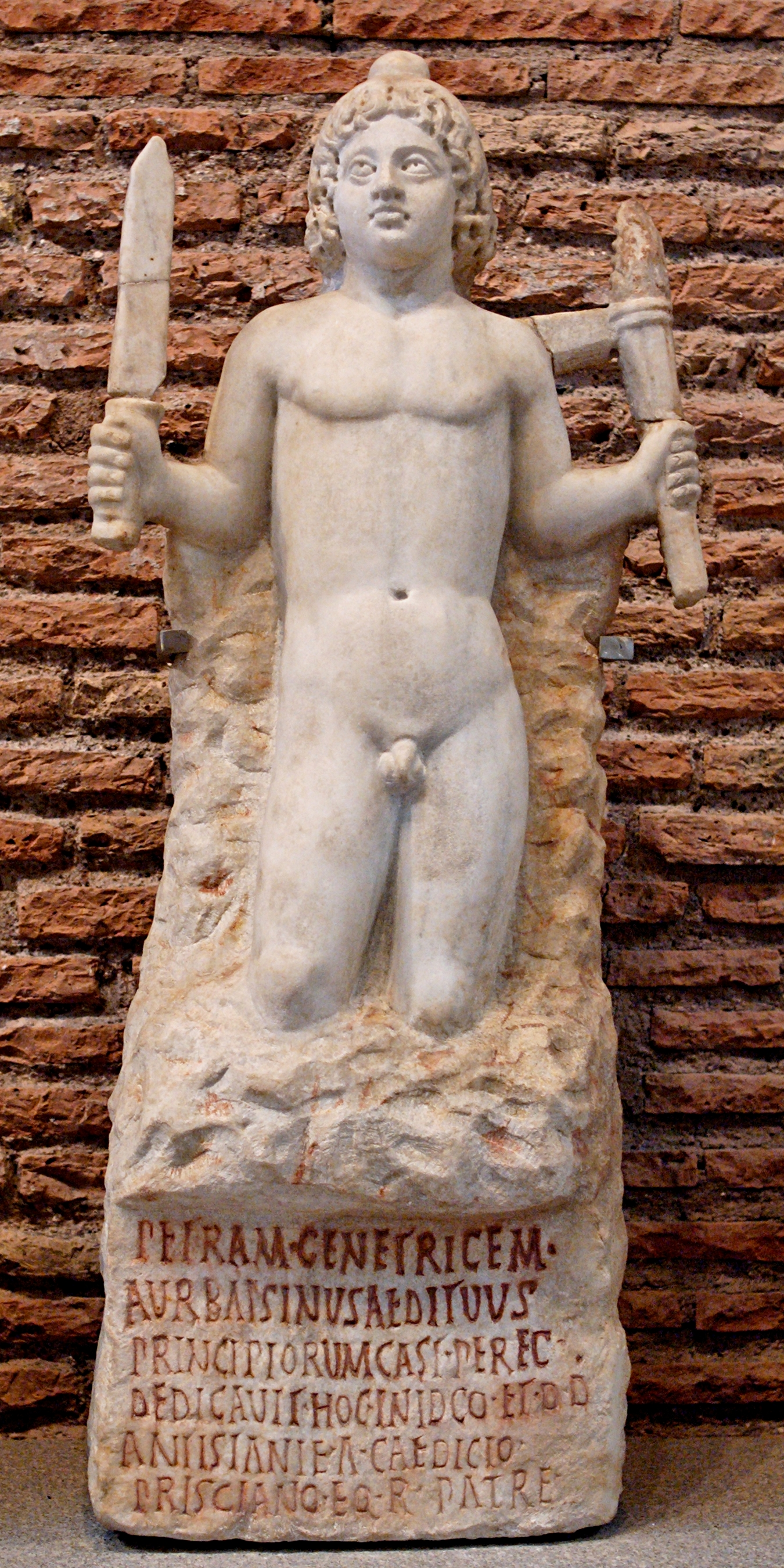
Mithra born from the rock (petra genetrix), statue dedicated by the ædituus (guardian of the sacred places) Aurelius Bassinus, from the principia (central part) of the castra peregrina. Marble, age of Commodus.

They were the headquarters of the secret service of the Empire, made up of peregrine milites such as the frumentarii and the speculatores. The soldiers of the legions, who stationed in the provinces and obtained particular merits in the field, could in fact be detached to the capital for particular functions (as happened for the frumentarii and the speculatores).

The speculatores (Latin for "explorers" or rather "espionage officers") were in fact in charge of gathering informations in all the provinces of the Empire and of the security of the State; the frumentarii (Latin for "couriers" or better "secret police" assigned to internal security) were those who – in Rome and in the provinces of Italy – "probed everyone's secrets", that is, they were assigned to internal control and therefore to the security of institutions such as the Senate and the Emperor. They were commanded by the princeps peregrinorum, responsible for the global security of the State, which, in its functions, reported directly to the Emperor.

They had an independent barracks - not even subject to the control of the urban cohorts and of the Praetorian Guard - located in the Caelian Hill, whose remains were found close to the Basilica of St. Stephen in the Round and in the excavations below the church itself. Inside there was a temple dedicated to Iuppiter Redux, but also other cults were practiced, as evidenced by the presence of a mithraeum. The structures show various phases and reconstructions between the 2nd and the 4th century. Some scholars assume that the construction of this camp was started by Augustus, at the time of the division of the city of Rome into 14 regiones.

== Fort (Castrum) of Amba Aradam-Ipponio ==
The Castrum of Amba Aradam-Ipponio was a fort in ancient Rome probably dating back to the time of the emperor Hadrian.

It was found during archaeological excavations in the future Amba Aradam-Ipponio Metro station (later named after Giorgio Marincola), in 2016. The area occupies 1750 m^{2} and is at a depth of ܃9 m. According to the archaeologists it could be one of those that we know housed special militias, the emperor's secret services (which were usually housed in the castra peregrina).

It was near to other barracks from different periods that have been found on the southern slope of the Caelian Hill: two Castra Nova Equitum Singularium, one under St. John in Lateran and another in via Tasso, and Castra Peregrina. A fragment of the Forma Urbis Romae, the marble map of Rome, that was recently discovered shows another barracks near Villa Celimontana.

The castrum was built along a stream, the Aqua Crabra, which was used to irrigate the gardens and then went into the Tiber.

In 2018 elaborately decorated rooms belonging to the commander and other officers were found with mosaics and also the so-called domus of the centurions.

The fort was abandoned then buried during the construction of the Aurelian Walls (271-275 AD), which also had to have a clear area in front for defensive reasons. It had been stripped of reusable materials like lead piping (though some remained) and partially razed.

== Bibliography ==
- Eva Margareta Steinby (editeb by), Lexicon topographicum urbis Romae, entry Castra, vol. I, Rome 1993.
- Paolo Liverani (edited by), Laterano 1. Scavi sotto la Basilica di S.Giovanni, Monumenta Sanctae Sedis, 1, Vatican City 1998 (about the Castra nova equitum singularium).
- K. Baillie Reynolds, The Journal of Roman Studies, The castra peregrinorum, 1923.

== See also ==
- Castra
- List of castra by province
