= Castra Peregrina =

Military barracks in Rome

- Location within Rome
- 41.884531°N 12.494212°E
- Type: Roman Barracks
- Location: Caelian Hill

History
- Built: 1st Century AD
- Built by: Augustus

The Castra Peregrina ("camp of the strangers") was a castrum (a military barracks) in Rome situated on the Caelian Hill. It was occupied by various military units during the later part of the Roman Empire.

== Location and archaeology ==
The barracks are situated on the Caelian Hill between the Temple of Claudius and Nero's Macellum Magnum. It is centrally located on a hill known for its housing of wealthy Romans. The fourth-century Regionaries list the Castra Peregrina in regio II.

The remains of the camp were discovered during digging for the foundations of a convent and hospital and partially excavated from 1904 to 1909. It can now be found just south-east of the well preserved church Santo Stefano al Monte Celio.

Within the castra was a shrine (templum) of Jupiter Redux erected in honour of Severus and Mammaea by a centurio frumentarius. A carving of the construction of the barracks was found at Ostia; on a column in the Square of the Corporations. In the initial excavation of the barracks, stone ships were also found; these were made by soldiers thanking the gods for protecting them from shipwrecks (see Fontana della Navicella) and provides further evidence of the spread of the barracks' frumentarii across the provinces.

== Function ==
It has been claimed by some authors, as the name suggests, that the barracks housed a garrison of peregrini, non-citizens and free subjects of the empire. Others, however, dispute this claim and have proposed that the barracks housed Roman citizens; if so, the name would not imply the lack of citizenship but rather refer to the fact that they were detached away from the legions for special services in Rome and elsewhere. They consisted of a majority of frumentarii and inscriptions suggest that the Castra Peregrina acted as a central base for the distribution of these men throughout the unarmed provinces (inermes). The frumentarii, who were likely based, and not only housed, at the Castra Peregrina, were initially involved in the provision supply service of Rome, but were later employed as military couriers and members of the secret service.

== History ==
Richardson suggests that the brickwork demonstrates an Augustan origin with a second century A.D. rebuilding, probably under Severus, and another rebuilding in third century A.D. However the earliest mention of the princeps peregrinorum (camp-commandant) in Rome was during the reign of Trajan. It is also mentioned by Ammianus Marcellinus, showing that it was in use as late as the fourth century A.D.

== See also ==
- Castra Nova equitum singularium
- Castra Praetoria
