= Regio II Caelimontium =

Historical region of Rome

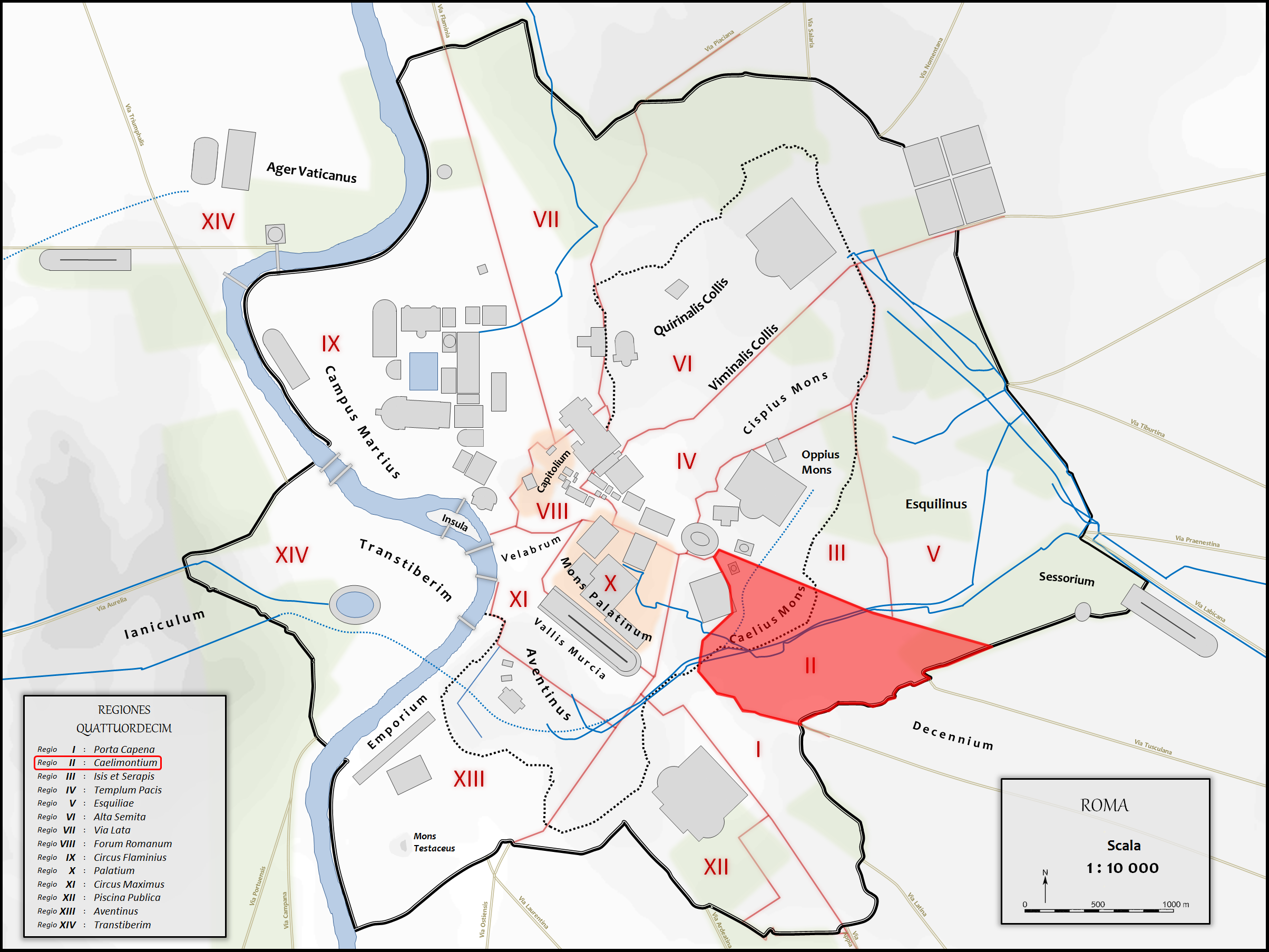

The Regio II Caelimontium is the second regio of imperial Rome, under Augustus's administrative reform. It took its name from the Caelian Hill, which the region was centred on.

== History ==
According to Livy, during the reign of Tullus Hostilius, the entire population of Alba Longa was forcibly resettled on the Caelian Hill. In Republican-era Rome the Caelian Hill was a fashionable residential district, site of residences of the wealthy. Archaeological work under the Baths of Caracalla has uncovered the remains of lavish villas complete with murals and mosaics. A significant area of the hill is taken up by the villa and gardens of Villa Celimontana. The Caelian Hill is the site of the Basilica of Santi Giovanni e Paolo and the ancient basilica of Santo Stefano Rotondo.

== Subdivisions ==
At the turn of the 5th century, the regio was divided into seven vici (districts) and 3,600 insulae (blocks). It had two curators and was served by 48 Roman magistrates.

== Geographic extent and features ==
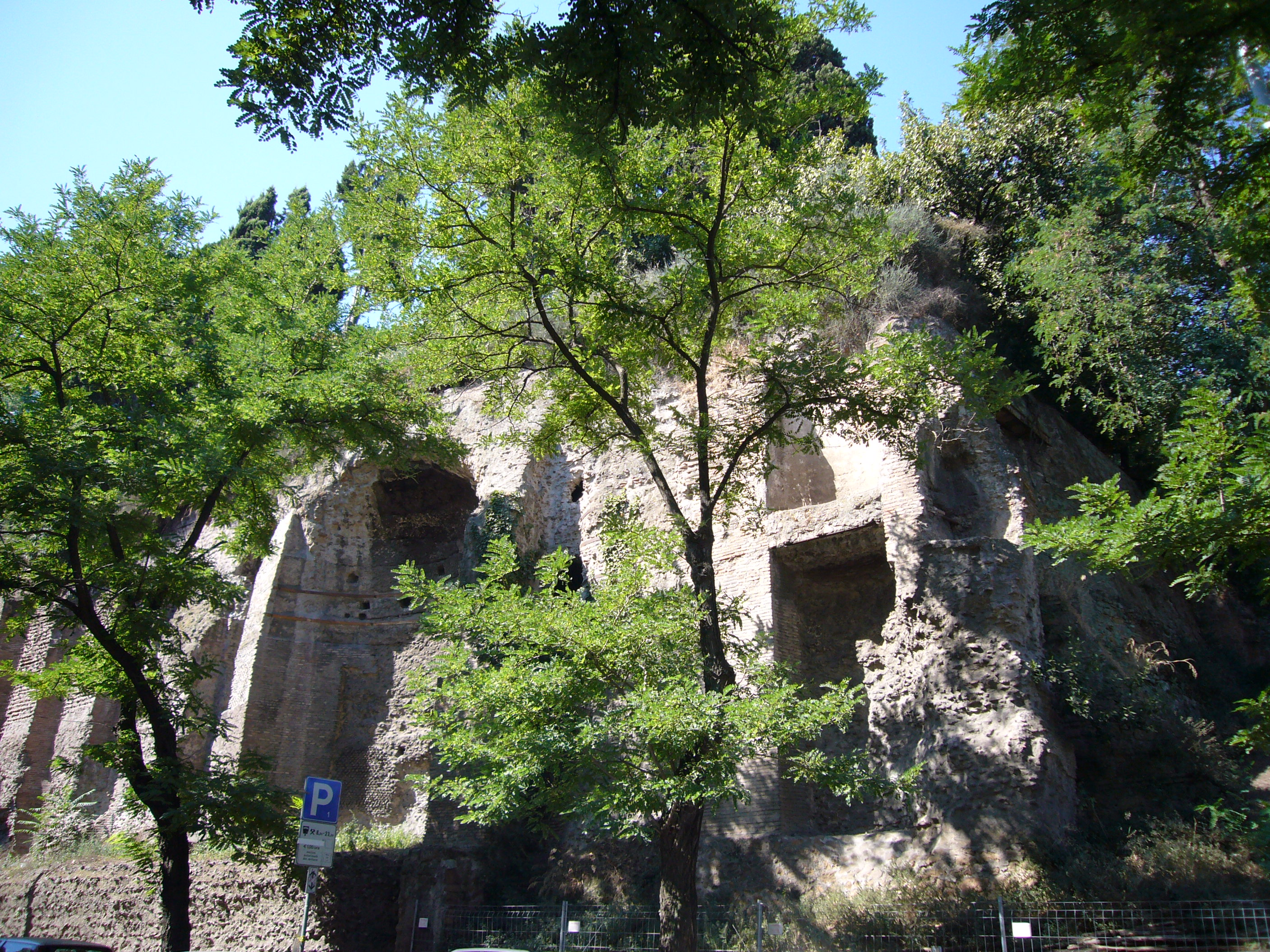
The remains of the Temple of Claudius

Regio II largely followed the contours of the Caelian Hill. To the west, its boundary was the Via Tusculana, and the south was eventually enclosed by the Aurelian Walls, through which two gates passed: the Porta Metronia and the Porta Asinaria. A measurement taken at the end of the 4th century recorded that the perimeter of the region was 12,200 Roman feet (approximately 3.61 km).

The region was dominated by the Temple of Claudius, which occupied much of the Caelian Hill. The region also contained the Macellum Magnum (or Great Market), the station of the fifth cohort of the Vigiles, and the Castra Peregrina. Also mentioned as being situated here was the Caput Africae, probably an educational and training institution (paedagogium) for young boys who would serve as imperial staff. A grotto, the Antrum Cyclopis was also present, situated in the side of the hill.

At the turn of the 5th century, the regio contained seven aediculae (shrines), 127 domūs (patrician houses), 27 horrea (warehouses), 85 balneae (bath houses) and 65 loci (fountains). It also contained the ludus matutinus, a gladiator school.
