= Suetonia gens =

Ancient Roman family

The gens Suetonia was a minor plebeian family at ancient Rome. Members of this gens are first mentioned in the reign of Claudius, under whom the general Gaius Suetonius Paulinus, consul in AD 66, won his first military victories; but the family is perhaps best known for the historian Gaius Suetonius Tranquillus, who flourished toward the beginning of the second century.

== Origin ==
The origin of the Suetonii is nowhere mentioned in ancient writers, but several of them came from Pisaurum in Umbria, suggesting that this may be their original home.

== Praenomina ==
The main praenomina of the Suetonii were Gaius and Lucius, the two most common names at all periods of Roman history. The only other names found among the inscriptions of this family are Sextus and Titus.

== Branches and cognomina ==
The only distinct family of the Suetonii bore the cognomen Paulinus or Paullinus, derived from the common surname Paullus, meaning "small", which could be bestowed on account of a person's stature, or upon the youngest child in a family. It is not known whether or how the historian Suetonius was related to this family.

== Members ==
This list includes abbreviated praenomina. For an explanation of this practice, see filiation.

- Lucius Suetonius L. l. Mama, a freedman named in an inscription from Rome, dating to the middle or later first century BC.
- Gaius Suetonius Paulinus, a celebrated general under the emperors Claudius, Nero, and Otho. As propraetor in Mauretania in AD 42, he defeated the Moors, and probably earned his first consulship. (Note: Paulinus may have been one of the suffecti in 42 or 43, but the details are unknown. He would almost certainly not have been appointed governor of Britain unless he were of consular rank. He was consul ordinarius in 66, probably holding the office from January to June, as a reward for his long and faithful service.) He was governor of Britannia from 59 to about 61, and put down the revolt of Boadicea. He was consul in 66, and one of Otho's generals during his war against Vitellius. He won an important victory, but after Otho's defeat, Paulinus surrendered to Vitellius, who pardoned him.
- Suetonia C. f. Faustula, ostensibly the daughter of Gaius Suetonius Paulinus, the governor of Britain, buried at the present site of Wotton-under-Edge. The inscription is thought to be modern.
- Gaius Suetonius Callistus, buried in a first-century tomb at the site of modern Montopoli di Sabina in Sabinum.
- Suetonia T. l. Dionysia, a freedwoman named in a first-century inscription from the site of modern Stroncone, formerly part of Sabinum.
- Suetonia C. C. Ɔ. l. Pelagia, a freedwoman named in a first-century inscription from Rome.
- Suetonius Laetus, father of the historian Suetonius, was a tribune angusticlavius in the Legio XIII Gemina, fought in AD 69 between the forces of Otho and Vitellius.
- Gaius Suetonius Tranquillus, the historian, was a friend of the younger Pliny the Younger, through whose influence he became tribune of the plebs, and was granted the jus trium liberorum by Trajan. He was magister epistolarum (Note: "Master of Letters", in this instance a secretary in charge of Hadrian's correspondence.) under Hadrian, although he was later deprived of his office, along with many others, on suspicion of having become overly familiar with the empress Sabina. Suetonius was a grammarian, and wrote numerous works, several of which have survived.
- Gaius Suetonius Claudianus, an eques at Caere in Etruria, where he served as aedile jure dicundo and praefectus aerarii, or treasurer, according to an inscription dating from AD 113.
- Gaius Suetonius Paullinus, a native of Pisaurum in Umbria, was a soldiers in the Praetorian Guard in AD 144.
- Lucius Suetonius Januarius, dedicated a second-century tomb at Interamna Nahars in Umbria for his father, Titus Mevidius Apollinaris.
- Gaius Suetonius C. f. Marcellinus, a native of Pisaurum, mentioned in a list of soldiers stationed at Rome in AD 154.
- Suetonius Germanus, together with his wife, Licinia, made an offering to Anna Perenna at Rome on the Nones of Aprilis (Note: April 5. The Nones were the ninth day before the Ides, counting inclusively, and the Ides of April fell on the 13th.) in AD 156.
- Suetonius Taurus, a frumentarius, and one of the heirs of Marcus Orbius, a soldier buried at Rome, aged thirty-five, with a tomb dating between AD 150 and 250, and dedicated by Taurus and Marcus Valerius Dionysius, Orbius' client and the other heir. Orbius, a native of Aquae Sextiae, had been an optio, and after serving for seventeen years, was made a centurion fifty-one days before his death.
- Suetonius Paulinus, a soldier in the first cohort of the Vigiles in AD 205.
- Suetonius Optatianus, said by Vopiscus to have written a detailed biography of the emperor Marcus Claudius Tacitus. From his name, and the fact that he is not mentioned by any other source, modern scholars suspect that he was an invention of Vopiscus.
- Suetonius Jovinus, a native of Dyrrachium in Epirus, buried in a fourth-century tomb at Brattia in Dalmatia, aged sixty, having died on January 3.

=== Undated Suetonii ===
- Lucius Suetonius Crescens, dedicated a tomb at Ateste in Venetia and Histria for his wife Suetonia Logas.
- Gaius Suetonius Diodorus, buried at Rome, with a monument dedicated by his friend, Postumius Fortunatus, and the freedwoman Primitia, one of his clients.
- Suetonius Fidus, named in a sepulchral inscription from Theveste in Africa Proconsularis.
- Gaius Suetonius Januarius, prefect of the Cohors I Chalcidenorum, one of the Roman Auxilia stationed in Numidia, dedicated a tomb for his wife, Papiria Irena, at the present site of Bir Um Ali.
- Suetonia L. l. Logas, buried at Ateste, with a monument from her husband, Lucius Suetonius Crescens.
- Sextus Suetonius Sex. l. Philodamus, dedicated a tomb at Pisae in Etruria to the freedwoman Suetonia Zophrona, perhaps his wife.
- Gaius Suetonius Rogatus, buried at Theveste, aged eighty, with a monument from his children.
- Suetonia Sex. l. Zophrona, a freedwoman buried at Pisae, in a tomb dedicated by the freedman Sextus Suetonius Philodamus, perhaps her husband.

== See also ==
- List of Roman gentes

== Bibliography ==
- Gaius Plinius Secundus (Pliny the Elder), Historia Naturalis (Natural History).
- Publius Cornelius Tacitus, De Vita et Moribus Iulii Agricolae (On the Life and Mores of Julius Agricola); Annales; Historiae.
- Gaius Suetonius Tranquillus, De Vita Caesarum (Lives of the Caesars, or The Twelve Caesars).
- Lucius Cassius Dio Cocceianus (Cassius Dio), Roman History.
- Aelius Lampridius, Aelius Spartianus, Flavius Vopiscus, Julius Capitolinus, Trebellius Pollio, and Vulcatius Gallicanus, Historia Augusta (Lives of the Emperors).
- Johann Caspar von Orelli, Inscriptionum Latinarum Selectarum Amplissima Collectio (An Extensive Collection of Select Latin Inscriptions), Orell Füssli, Zürich (1828).
- Dictionary of Greek and Roman Biography and Mythology, William Smith, ed., Little, Brown and Company, Boston (1849).
- Theodor Mommsen et alii, Corpus Inscriptionum Latinarum (The Body of Latin Inscriptions, abbreviated CIL), Berlin-Brandenburgische Akademie der Wissenschaften (1853–present).
- René Cagnat et alii, L'Année épigraphique (The Year in Epigraphy, abbreviated AE), Presses Universitaires de France (1888–present).
- August Pauly, Georg Wissowa, et alii, Realencyclopädie der Classischen Altertumswissenschaft (Scientific Encyclopedia of the Knowledge of Classical Antiquities, abbreviated PW), J. B. Metzler, Stuttgart (1894–1980).
- Paul von Rohden, Elimar Klebs, & Hermann Dessau, Prosopographia Imperii Romani (The Prosopography of the Roman Empire, abbreviated PIR), Berlin (1898).
- Stéphane Gsell, Inscriptions Latines de L'Algérie (Latin Inscriptions from Algeria, abbreviated ILAlg), Edouard Champion, Paris (1922–present).
- Paul A. Gallivan, "Some Comments on the Fasti for the Reign of Nero", in Classical Quarterly, vol. 24, pp. 290–311 (1974); "The Fasti for the Reign of Claudius", in Classical Quarterly, vol. 28, pp. 407–426 (1978).
- John C. Traupman, The New College Latin & English Dictionary, Bantam Books, New York (1995).
- Anthony Birley, "Suetonius Paullinus, Gaius", in the Oxford Dictionary of National Biography, Oxford University Press (2004).
