= Equites singulares Augusti =

Roman Praetorian Guard unit

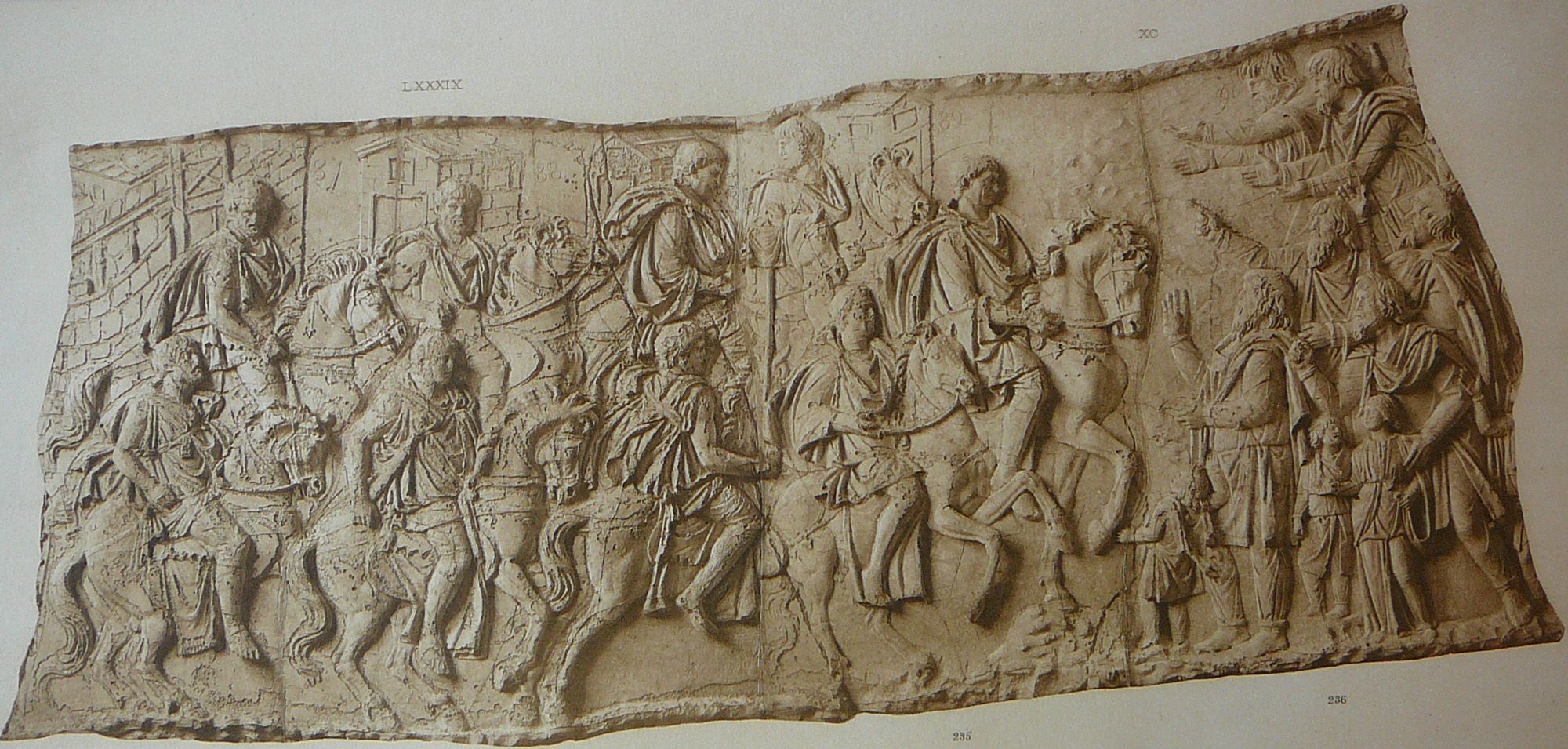
Imperial horseguards (left) escort the emperor Trajan (centre right) on campaign in Dacia (AD 101–6). Detail from Trajan's Column, Rome

The equites singulares Augusti or equites singulares Imperatoris (lit: "personal cavalry of the emperor" i.e. imperial horseguards) were the cavalry arm of the Praetorian Guard during the Principate period of imperial Rome. Based in Rome, they escorted the Roman emperor whenever he left the city on a campaign or on tours of the provinces. The equites singulares Augusti were a highly trained unit dedicated to protecting the emperor. Men who served in the equites singulares Augusti held a Roman public status as equites.

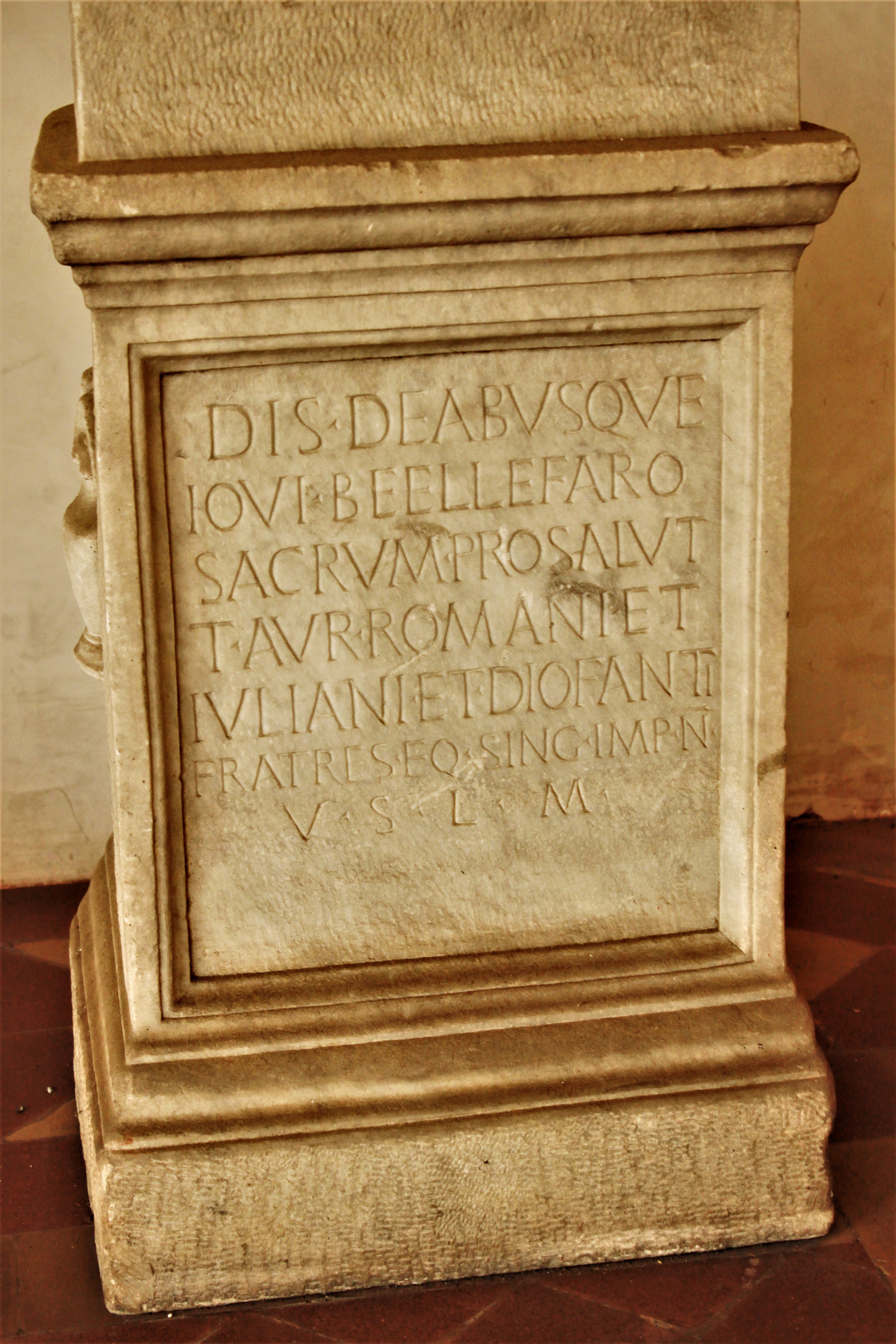
Gravestone of two brothers, Julian and Diophantus, describing them as equites singulares Imperatoris (abbreviated EQ SING IMP).

== Unit history ==
The unit's origin is uncertain but it appears that they were formed in the late 1st Century AD and existed during the reign of Trajan (98–117 AD). The unit is documented on Trajan's Column as active in the Dacian Wars (101–102 and 105–106). It has been suggested that they were formed of Trajan's personal horseguards during his governorship of Germania Superior.

Although designated in inscriptions as a numerus, it appears to have been structured as a regular military (i.e., double-strength) ala of the Auxilia, under the command of a tribunus militum, who probably reported to the Praefectus Praetorio, the commandant of the Guard. Initially, it probably contained 720 horsemen, divided into 24 turmae, or squadrons, of 30 men each. Numbers rose to around 1,000 under Hadrian (r. 117–138 AD) and the regiment was expanded to some 2,000 horse in the early 3rd century by the emperor Septimius Severus (r. 197–211 AD).

Their home-base was in Rome, and their permanent camp was on the Caelian Hill. A second, supplementary, camp was built, also on the Caelian, when the unit was expanded under Septimius Severus; this has been excavated underneath the Basilica of San Giovanni in Laterano, Rome (see Castra Nova equitum singularium).

It is believed that equites singulares were recruited from serving cavalrymen in the alae of the Auxilia, selected for their quality, and, since membership of the Praetorian Guard was strictly limited to persons holding Roman citizenship, were granted citizenship on enlistment, instead of having to serve 25 years to qualify for citizenship as did their fellow alares. It has also been claimed that equites singulares were recruited in Italy among natural born Roman citizens.

The equipment of the equites singulares was the same as for ordinary auxiliary cavalrymen. From the Great Trajanic Frieze incorporated in the Arch of Constantine in Rome, it appears that the emblem of the equites singulares was the scorpion, which was emblazoned on their standards and (fourfold) on their shields. The scorpion was the birth-sign of the emperor Tiberius, and presumably represented Tiberius' role as 'second founder' of the Praetorian Guard.

It appears that after some campaigns, detachments of singulares were left behind in the provinces, to form the core of new regular alae, which retained the prestigious singulares title and crack reputation (e.g., the Ala I Flavia singularium stationed in Raetia in mid-2nd century).

In AD 312, after the defeat of the emperor Maxentius at the battle of the Milvian Bridge, the regiment was disbanded, along with the rest of the Praetorian Guard, by the emperor Constantine I (r. 306–337 AD). The unit may already have become redundant, if the scholae, elite cavalry regiments escorting the emperor, had already been established by the emperor Diocletian (r. 284–305 AD). Alternatively, the scholae may have been founded by Constantine as a direct replacement for the equites singulares.

== See also ==
- Vexillatio

== References and Further Reading ==
- Birley, Anthony (2002). Band of Brothers: Garrison Life at Vindolanda.
- Cowan, Ross (2014). Roman Guardsman 62 BC - AD 324.
- Goldsworthy, Adrian (2003). Complete Roman Army.
- Jones, A.H.M. (1964). The Later Roman Empire.
- Holder, Paul (2003). Auxiliary Deployment in the Reign of Hadrian.
- Rankov, Boris (1994). Guardians of the Roman Empire.
- Rossi, L. (1971). Trajan's Column and the Dacian Wars.
- Speidel, Michael P. (1994). Die Denkmäler der Kaiserreiter. Equites singulares Augusti. Köln/Bonn: Rheinland-Verlag/Rudolf Habelt, ISBN 3-7927-1189-3.
- Tomlin, R. S. O. (1988). "The Army of the Late Empire" in The Roman World (ed J. Wacher).
