= Frumentarii =

Ancient Roman intelligence agency

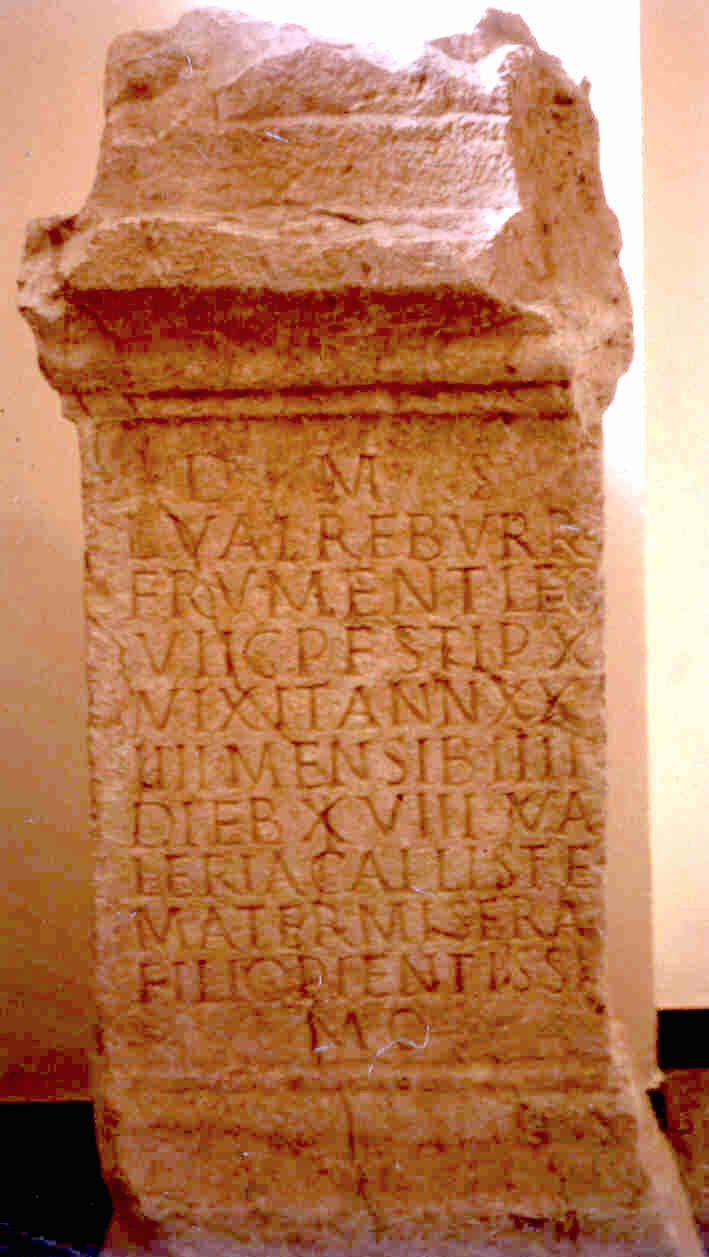
Inscription about a frumentarius from Legio VII Gemina.

The frumentarii (lit. grain gatherers or foragers) were an ancient Roman military and secret police organization used as an intelligence agency. They began their history as a courier service and developed into an imperial spying agency. Their organization would also carry out assassinations. The frumentarii were headquartered in the Castra Peregrina and were run by the princeps peregrinorum. They were disbanded under the reign of Diocletian due to their poor reputation amongst the populace.

== History ==
Utilizing informers and spies had been a long-standing policy of the Roman legions and armies of occupation, but never in an organized fashion. This was especially true in the city of Rome, which was rife with whispers and endless conspiracies. The frumentarii were possibly established by Domitian, although they only appear in records shortly after his reign in the early second century. When established, their base was located at the Castra Peregrina on the Caelian hill, though Trajan would later centralize their location in Rome. During their early history, they were tasked with supplying grain to the military, delivering messages between the provinces and the empire, and collecting tax money.

They were sometimes called nomas ("nomads" in Latin) to protect their identity in enemy territory.

After the end of the Flavian Dynasty, the frumentarii developed into a police force. They worked as non-commissioned officers with praetorian cohorts to police the populace. This organization was part of the military, and its members were legionaries. Members of this group were recruited from the military. By the 2nd century, the need for an empire-wide intelligence service was clear. But even an emperor could not easily create a new bureau with the express purpose of spying on the citizens of Rome's far-flung domains. A suitable compromise was found by Hadrian. He used the frumentarii as a spying agency because their duties brought them into contact with enough locals and natives, allowing them to acquire considerable intelligence about any given territory. Alongside these duties they also may have overseen and guarded mining operations.

They served as secret police and as an intelligence agency in ancient Rome. Emperors would use them to gather information on friends, family, officials, or soldiers. This organization was sometimes tasked with assassinating whomever the emperor wished. Peasants disliked the frumentarii due to false and arbitrary arrests. They were seen as a tyrannical "plague" on the empire. These complaints lead to the disbandment of the organization in 312 AD during the reign of Diocletian. The frumentarii were replaced by the agentes in rebus.

They were run by the princeps peregrinorum who was considered to be a senior centurion and answered to the praetorian prefect. The subprinceps was the second-in-command to the princeps peregrinorum and the optio peregrinorum, canaliclarius, and aedilis castrorum were all other offices in the frumenatarii. The curatio frumentarii would command the frumentarii in the imperial provinces. The frumentarii served in the officium consularis of the local governor.

The following story has been used as evidence of the role of the frumentarii:

[Hadrian's] vigilance was not confined to his own household but extended to those of his friends, and by means of his private agents (frumentarios) he even pried into all their secrets, and so skilfully that they were never aware that the Emperor was acquainted with their private lives until he revealed it himself. In this connection, the insertion of an incident will not be unwelcome, showing that he found out much about his friends. The wife of a certain man wrote to her husband, complaining that he was so preoccupied by pleasures and baths that he would not return home to her, and Hadrian found this out through his private agents. And so, when the husband asked for a furlough, Hadrian reproached him with his fondness for his baths and his pleasures. Whereupon the man exclaimed: "What, did my wife write you just what she wrote to me?".

== See also ==
- Agentes in rebus, Romans agents from the 4th to the 7th centuries
