= Temple of Claudius =

Ancient Roman temple in Rome

Coordinates: 41°53′15.34″N 12°29′36.12″E

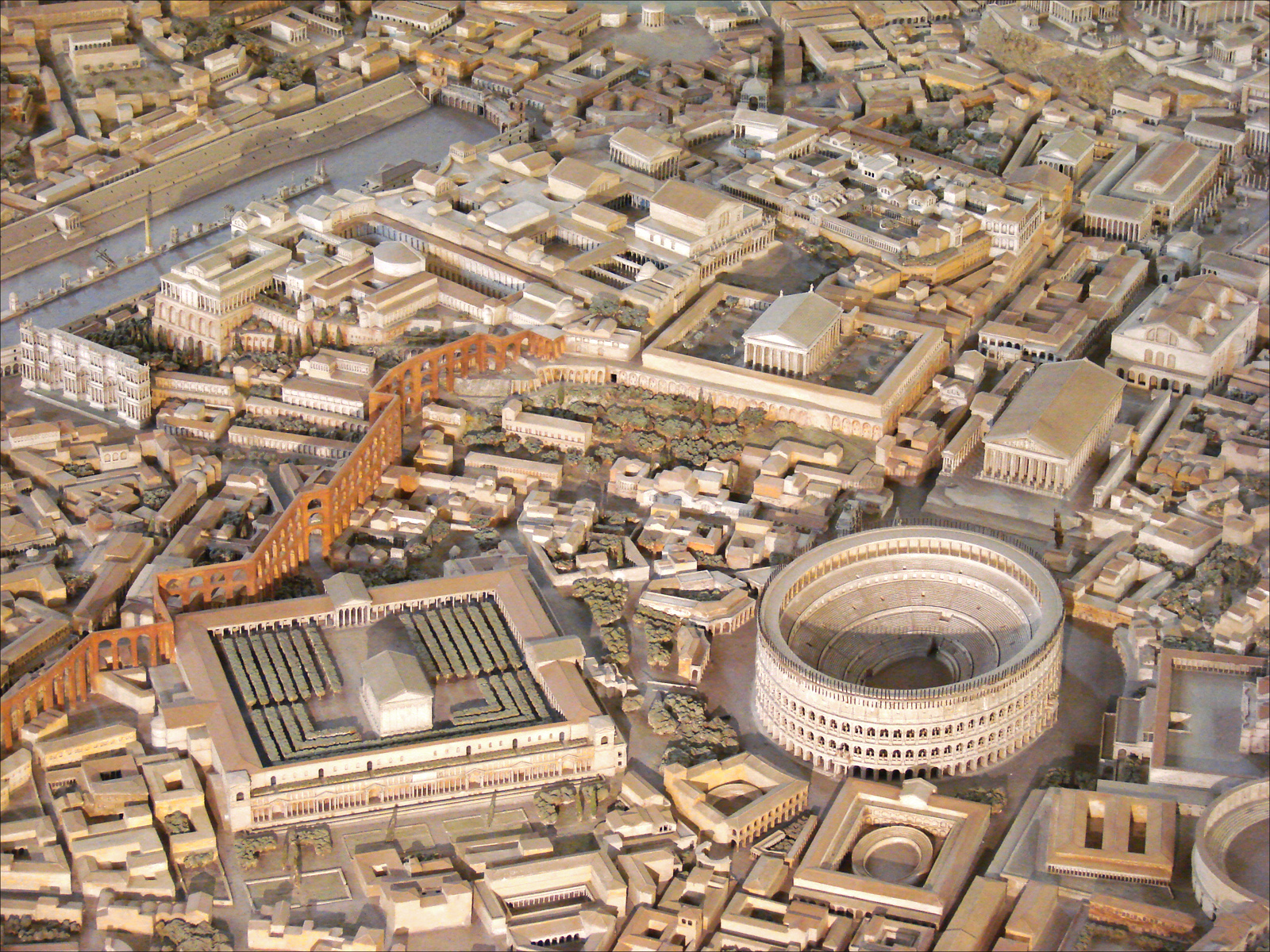
The Temple of Claudius to the south (left) of the Colosseum (photo of the model of Imperial Rome at the Museo della Civilta Romana in Rome).

The Temple of Claudius (Latin: Templum Divi Claudii), also known in an abbreviated form as the Claudium, was an ancient Roman temple that covered a large area of the Caelian Hill in Rome, Italy. It housed the imperial cult of the emperor Claudius, who was deified after his death in 54 AD.

== History ==
Construction of the Temple of Claudius on the Caelian Hill was begun by Agrippina, the fourth wife of the Emperor Claudius, after his death in 54 AD. In 59 Agrippina was murdered by her son, the Emperor Nero, who converted the massive podium built to support the unfinished temple to his own uses. The eastern wall was transformed into a grand nymphaeum, or elaborate fountain, to embellish the view from Nero's new palace, the Domus Aurea, on the adjacent Oppian Hill. The nymphaeum was made up of tiered columns and semicircular and rectangular niches; it likely would have contained a large sculptural group at the centre. Archaeological excavations confirm that the water cascaded from the top of the nymphaeum down into 4 basins, which in turn fed into the huge pool in the valley now occupied by the Colosseum, which was in the time of Nero the centrepiece of the gardens belonging to the Domus Aurea.

To supply his nymphaeum with water, Nero constructed reservoirs within the Caelian and built a new branch aqueduct to carry water to the hill from the Aqua Claudia. This branch, known as the Arcus Neroniani, accessed the Claudia at Porta Maggiore and ran 2 kilometres (1.2 mi) west to the southern side of the Caelian Hill, where it terminated at a structure called the Aqueductium. From there conduits branched off along the hill to the north, bringing water to the nymphaeum and the temple. Another conduit was carried to the western edge of the hill and ended right beside the Temple of Claudius.

Vespasian reconstructed the Temple of Claudius and established an association dedicated to the worship of the numen of Claudius, known as the Augustales, adjacent to the temple on its southern side. A fragment of the Forma Urbis which depicts the southern end of the temple complex shows an apsidal building in front of the stairs and rampway which accessed the temple, which was likely the home of this association. The last mention of the temple is from the fourth century and nothing is known of what happened to it after Vespasian's reconstruction. Rodolfo Lanciani believed that it could have been falling into ruins as early as the mid 4th century, when a capital from one of the podium columns on the west side was reused in the house of John and Paul (the Basilica of Santi Giovanni e Paolo al Celio was built over the house at the end of the 4th century). In the 15th century, Pope Paul II used stone from the ruins of the Claudium to build the Palazzo San Marco in the Campus Martius.

== Location and design ==
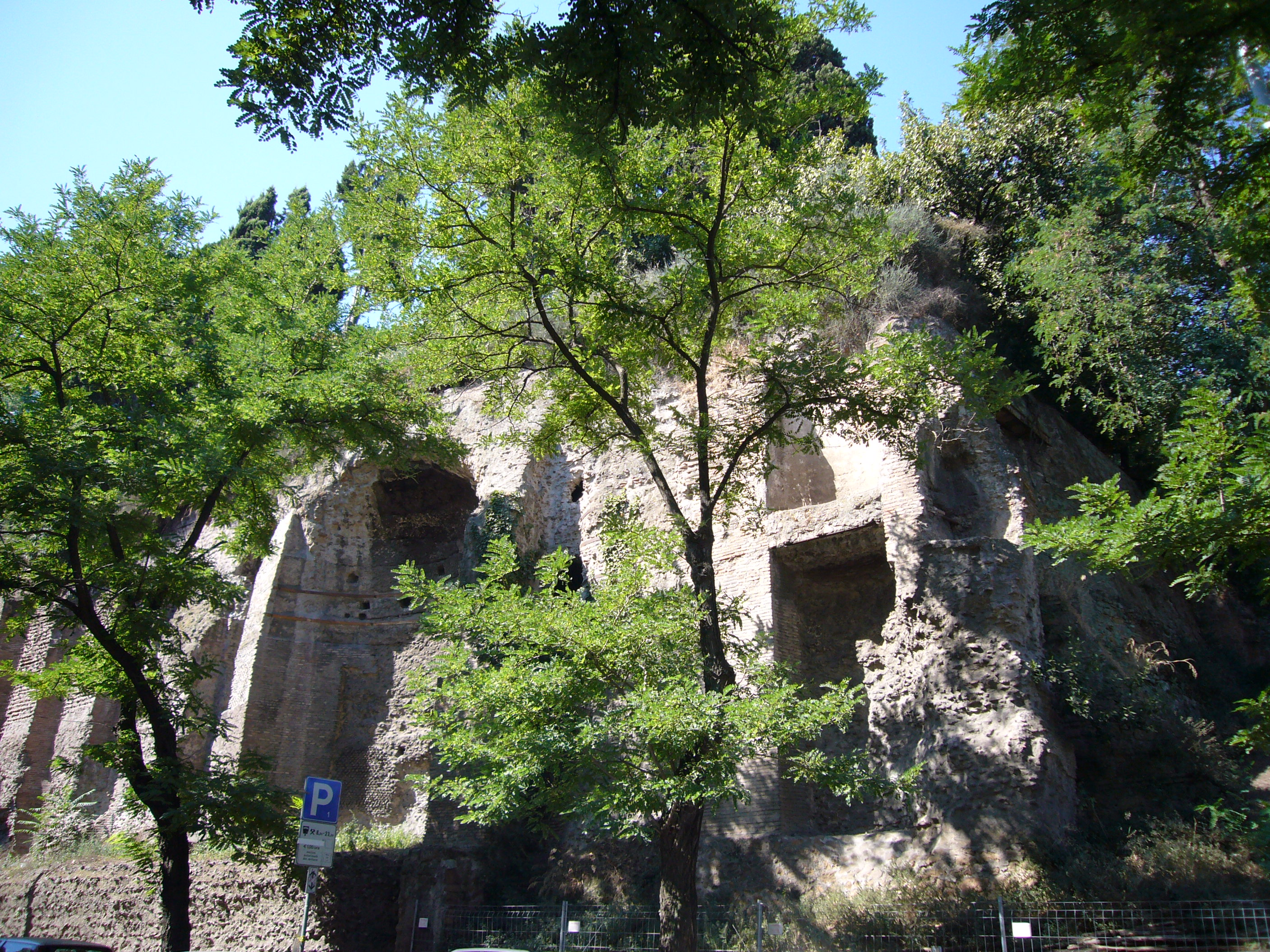
View of the temple from via Claudia

The area occupied by the Temple is approximately bounded by the present roads of Via Claudia, Viale del Parco del Celio and the Clivus Scauri. The temple stood on a great rectangular platform measuring 180 by 200 metres (590 ft × 660 ft), supported by powerful retaining walls of 15 metres (49 ft) or more, that are still partly visible. The actual temple was constructed on a podium 20 steps above the surrounding platform. The entrance to the courtyard was from the south, through a monumental central entrance with an imposing stairway, oriented towards the Palatine Hill.

The design of the Temple is partially known from seven fragments of the Forma Urbis and a Renaissance drawing of another, now lost fragment, in the Vatican Library. Together they depict a temple with a prostyle hexastyle porch (a projecting porch with six columns) on the west side of the building. It was surrounded by a large garden composed of parallel rows of shrubs. Although not depicted on the Forma Urbis, the temple and gardens were likely encircled on all four sides by a portico (a Porticus Claudia is mentioned by the poet Martial).

== Remains ==
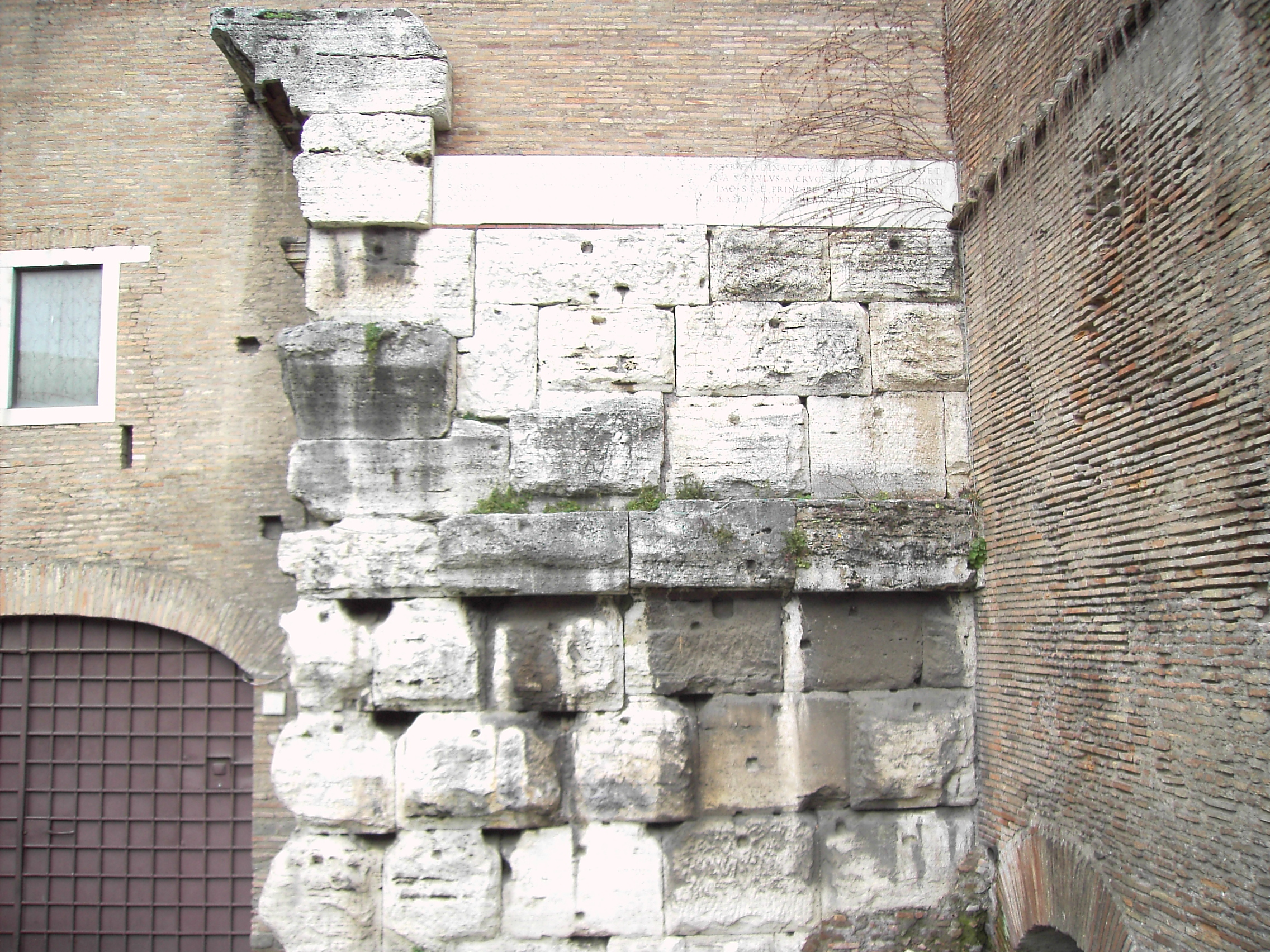
Remains of the Temple at the base of the tower of the basilica of Santi Giovanni e Paolo, Rome

The known remains are of the four sides of the platform and nothing remains of the temple above. The western side of the platform was constructed with travertine and some remains were incorporated into the bell tower of the basilica of Santi Giovanni e Paolo. The northern side was composed of a row of vaulted rooms. During the time of Nero there were fountains and the remains of one of these, consisting of a ship's bow with a boar's head, were found and are now in the Capitoline Museums. Vespasian subsequently reduced the consumption of water, returning it to civilian use. The east side is the best preserved, and changes carried out by Nero can be noted here. The area was rediscovered when a new road, the Via Claudia, was constructed in 1880. Underneath the temple area there are tunnels through tuff that have recently been mapped by the Italian authorities.

A marble capital from the Temple of Claudius was reused in the Basilica of Santa Maria degli Angeli e dei Martiri when it was constructed in the ruins of the Baths of Diocletian in the 1560s. Statues made of rare Egyptian greywacke representing Agrippina and Claudius' son Britannicus (the former in the Capitoline Museums and the latter in the Uffizi), are believed to have resided in the temple of Claudius as part of a family statuary group. The statue of Agrippina shows her with her head covered and wearing a crown, possibly depicting her in the role of priestess to the cult of her deceased husband. There are also two marble thrones found close to the site of the Claudium, now in the Glyptothek in Munich, which are presumed to have decorated the temple, possibly as honorific seats for the established Roman gods to 'visit' the deified Claudius in his sacred space.

== See also ==
- List of Ancient Roman temples
- List of ancient sites in Rome
