= Castra Nova equitum singularium =

Ancient Roman fort in Rome

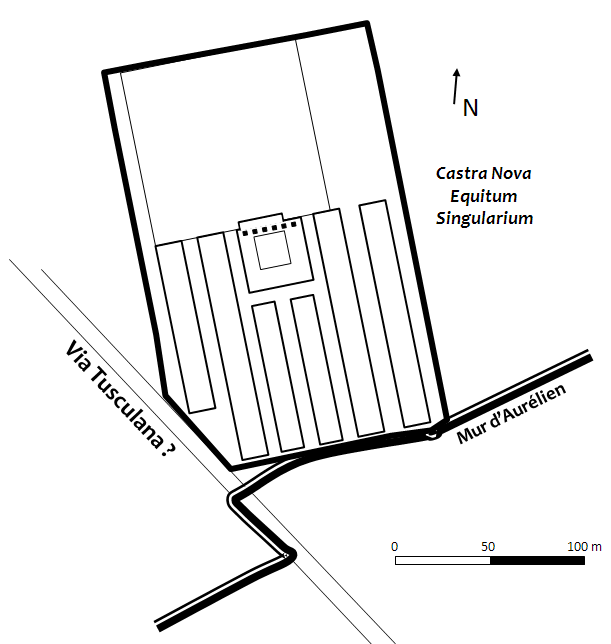
Castra nova map

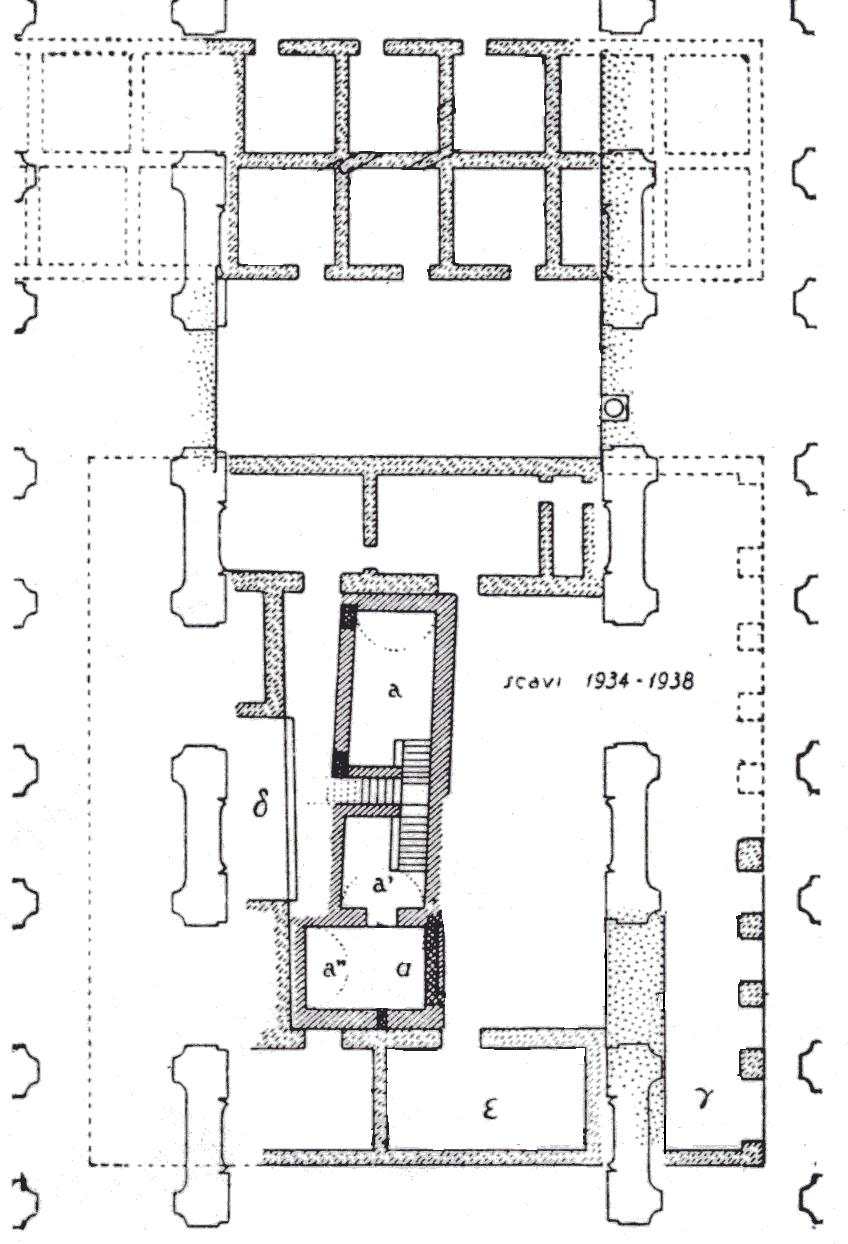
Plan of the archaeological remains of the fort. After Collini 1944

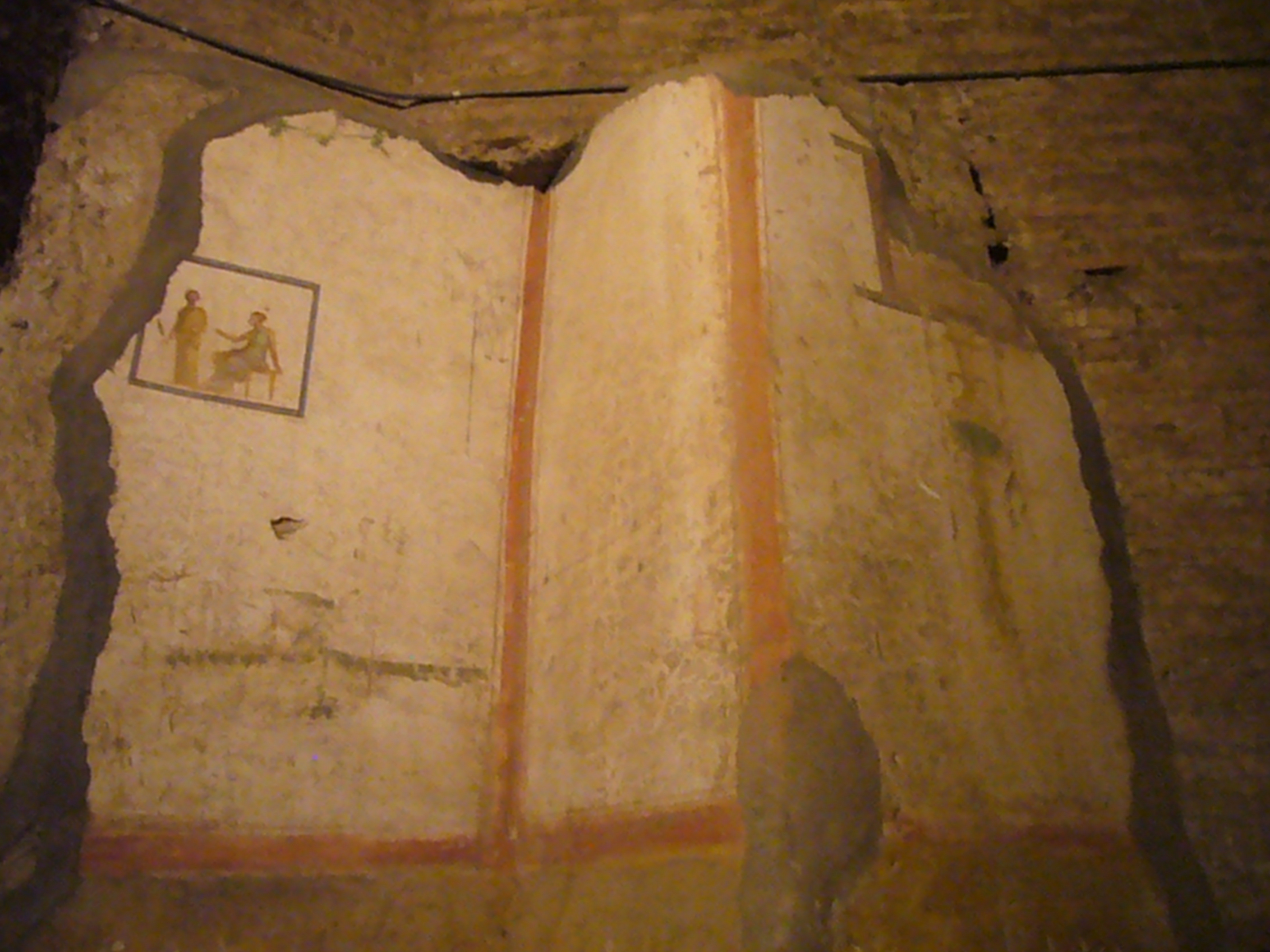
Fresco on the wall

The Castra Nova equitum singularium was an ancient Roman fort in Rome housing part of the emperor's cavalry bodyguard. The site of the fort now lies beneath the Basilica of St John Lateran. The Castra Nova, or "new fort", was one of two cavalry forts that provided a base in Rome for the mounted bodyguard of the Roman emperors (the Equites singulares Augusti).

The Castra Nova was so-called because it was the newer of the two forts, built to house an enlargement of the cavalry guard. Their previous fort Castra Prioria which lay not far away to the north had been built earlier, possibly under the emperor Domitian, and still housed the original force of 1500 mounted troopers. The full name of the fort is Castra nova Equitum singularium Augusti.

== History ==
The fort can be precisely dated to AD 193, at the beginning of the reign of Septimius Severus. The new camp was necessitated by this emperor's increase in the size of his cavalry guard from 1,500 to 2,000 men.

The camp site was always speculated as being beneath the cathedral of St John Lateran (Basilica di San Giovanni in Laterano). However, it was identified definitively by excavations between 1934 and 1938 undertaken by Enrico Josi. Josi had obtained permission to explore the area of the basilica’s nave in advance of the construction of a new reinforced concrete floor. Within days it became clear that the remains of the Castra Nova existed in good condition just below the floor level and that the excavation was including a large part of the principia (headquarters) building. The completed excavations were then published by Colini.

A large two-storey storage building and two barracks were also uncovered, but the greatest interest centred around the principia as its two strong rooms were very well preserved as were several office rooms. On the completion of the investigation the remains were preserved beneath the basilica (along with the remains of the Constantinian cathedral and a Neronian domus) in a spectacular underground archaeological park.

== The curatores inscriptions ==
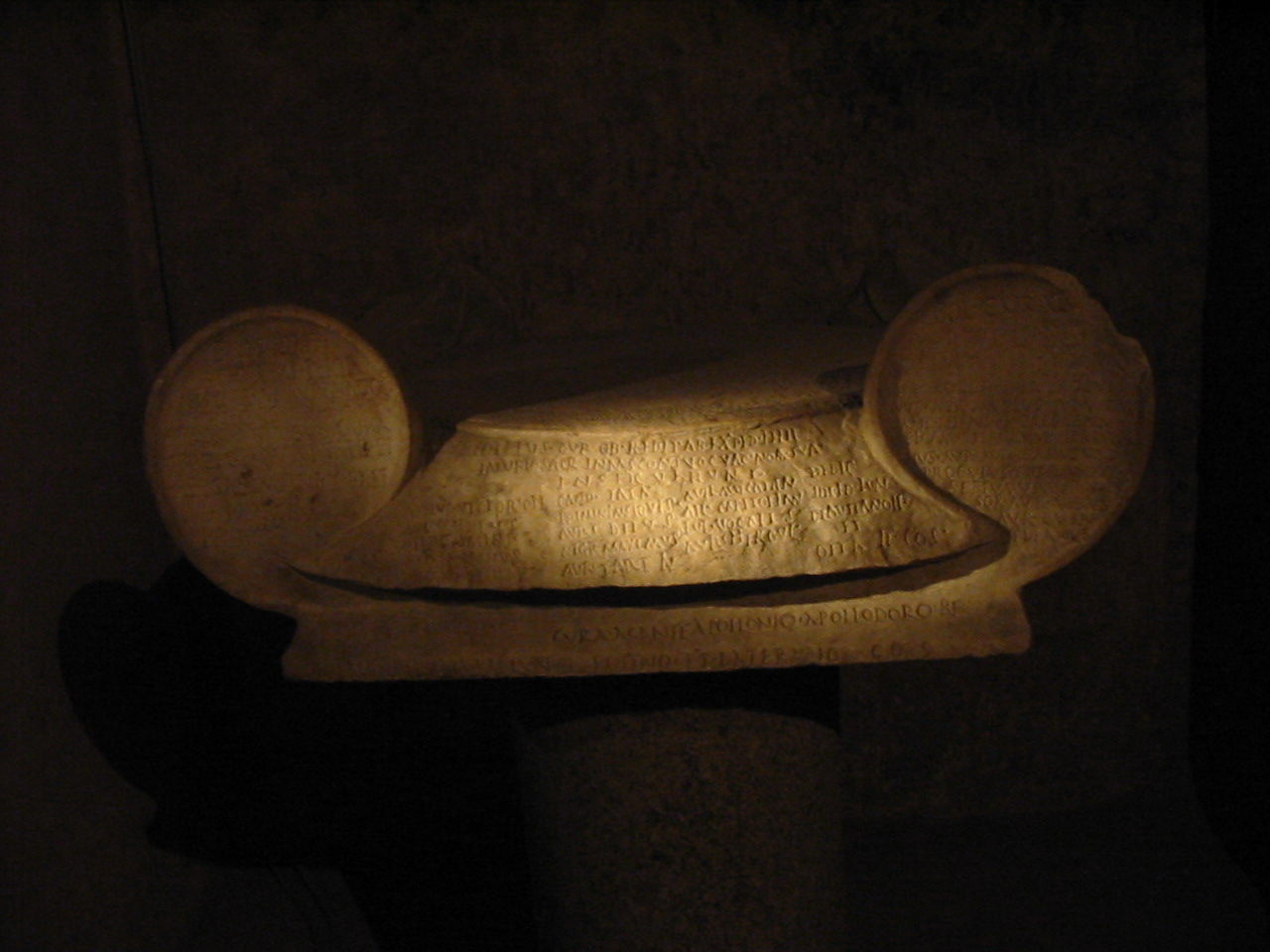
Ionic capital carrying the two inscriptions from the curatores

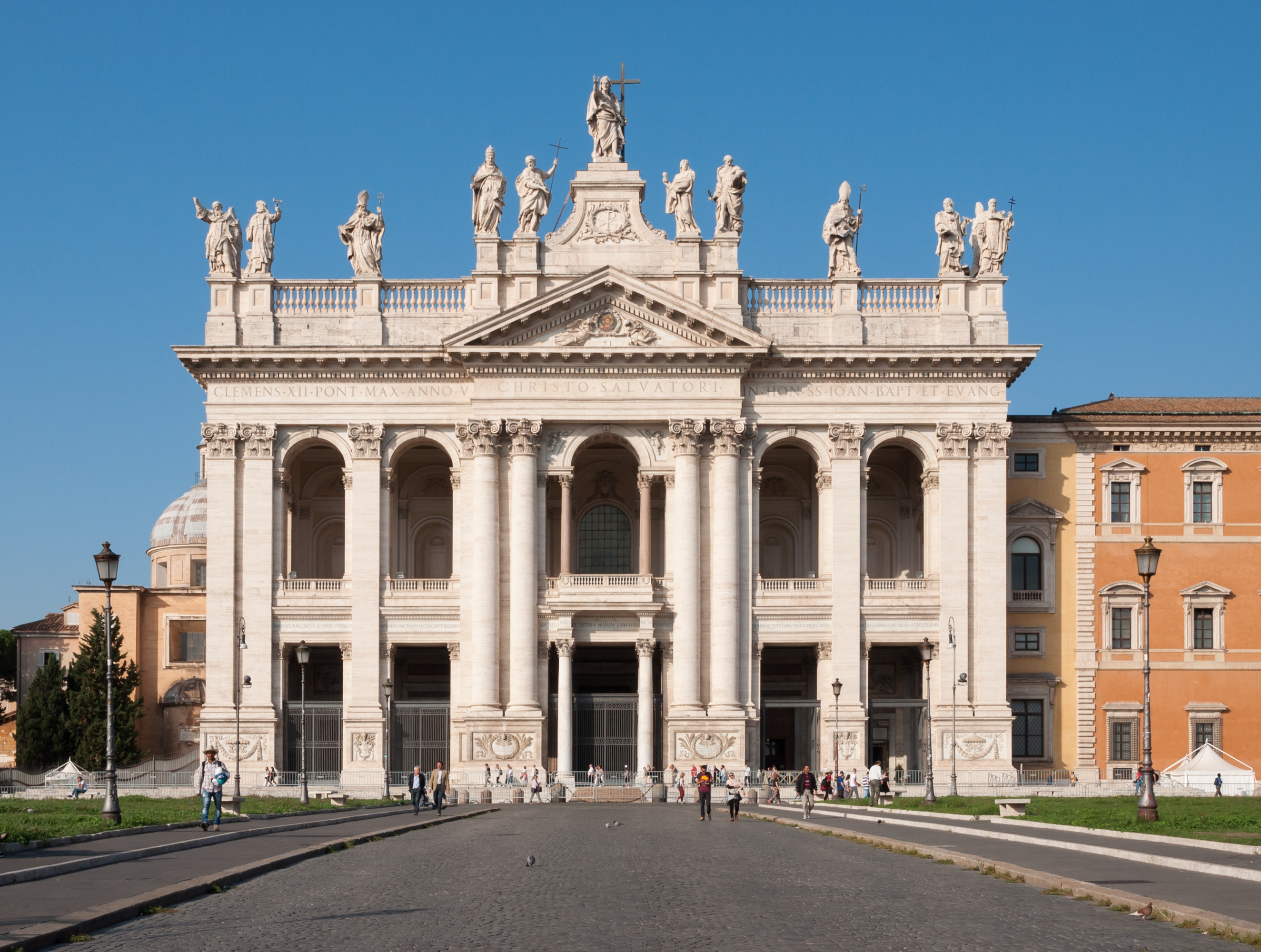
San Giovanni in Laterano overlying the fort

In 1934, an Ionic capital was uncovered within one of the headquarters rooms (room “ε” on plan above), lying beside a short granite column that was still set into the floor. Upon the capital two inscriptions had been carved on behalf of an association of curatores, soldiers who were the grooms for the garrison horses. The first text was dedicated on 1 January 197 in the consulship of Rufinus and Lateranus. The Equites were known to have served at the Battle of Lyon on the 19 February, though evidently these men did not. The inscription records the dedication of the schola curatorum to Minerva Augusta, indicating that the collegium curatorum itself had only recently become in possession of an official meeting room that they could consecrate.

The second inscription was dedicated in 203 ob reditum ab expeditione felicissima in urvem sacram i.e. on the return of the guards to Rome following their escorting of the imperial family. The expeditione felicissima may refer to the entire series of events since the equites singulares Augusti left Rome in 197.

The toppling of the capital furthermore provided historical evidence attesting to the destruction of the Castra Nova by Constantine’s forces and providing a terminus ante quem for both the dissolution of the collegium as well as for the camp itself.

== See also ==
- Equites singulares Augusti

== Sources ==
- Buzzetti, C. 1997. ‘Castra Equitum Singularium’, in E. M. Steinby (ed), Lexicon Topographicum Urbis Romae, 1 (A - C). Rome: Edizioni Quasar.
- Colini, A. M. 1944. Storia e Topografia del Celio nell’antichità (Atti Pontificia Accadia romana archeologia (3rdseries) 7). Vatican: Tipografia Poliglotta Vaticana.
- Coulston, J. 2000. ‘Armed and belted men: the soldiery in imperial Rome’, in J. Coulston and H. Dodge (eds.), Ancient Rome: The archaeology of the eternal city. Oxford: Alden Press.
- Josi, E. 1934. ‘Scoperte nella Basilica Constantiniana al Laterano’, Rivista di Archeologia Cristiana, 11, 353-358.
- Speidel, M. P. 1994. Riding for Caesar. London: Batsford.
