= Caelian Hill =

One of the seven hills of Rome, Italy

Coordinates: 41°53′06″N 12°29′48″E

- One of the seven hills of Rome
- Latin name: Collis Caelius
- Italian name: Celio
- Rione: Celio
- Buildings: Baths of Caracalla, Villa Celimontana
- Churches: Santi Giovanni e Paolo, Santo Stefano Rotondo, San Gregorio Magno al Celio, San Tommaso in Formis, Santa Maria in Domnica
- People: Tullus Hostilius, Caelius Vibenna, Servius Tullius

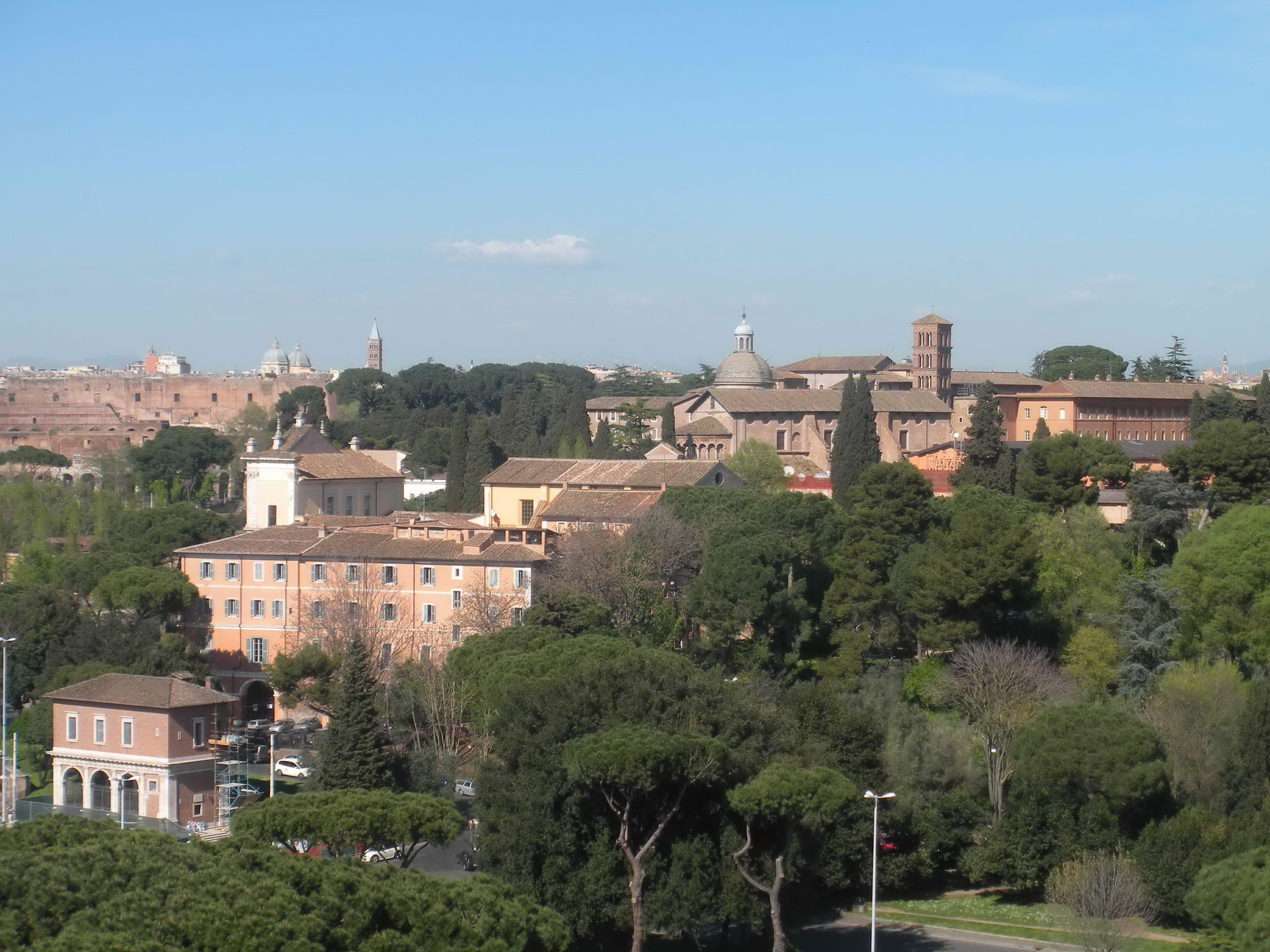
Caelian Hill

The Caelian Hill (/ˈsiːliən/ SEE-lee-ən; Latin: Collis Caelius; Italian: Celio [ˈtʃɛːljo]) is one of the famous seven hills of Rome.

== Geography ==
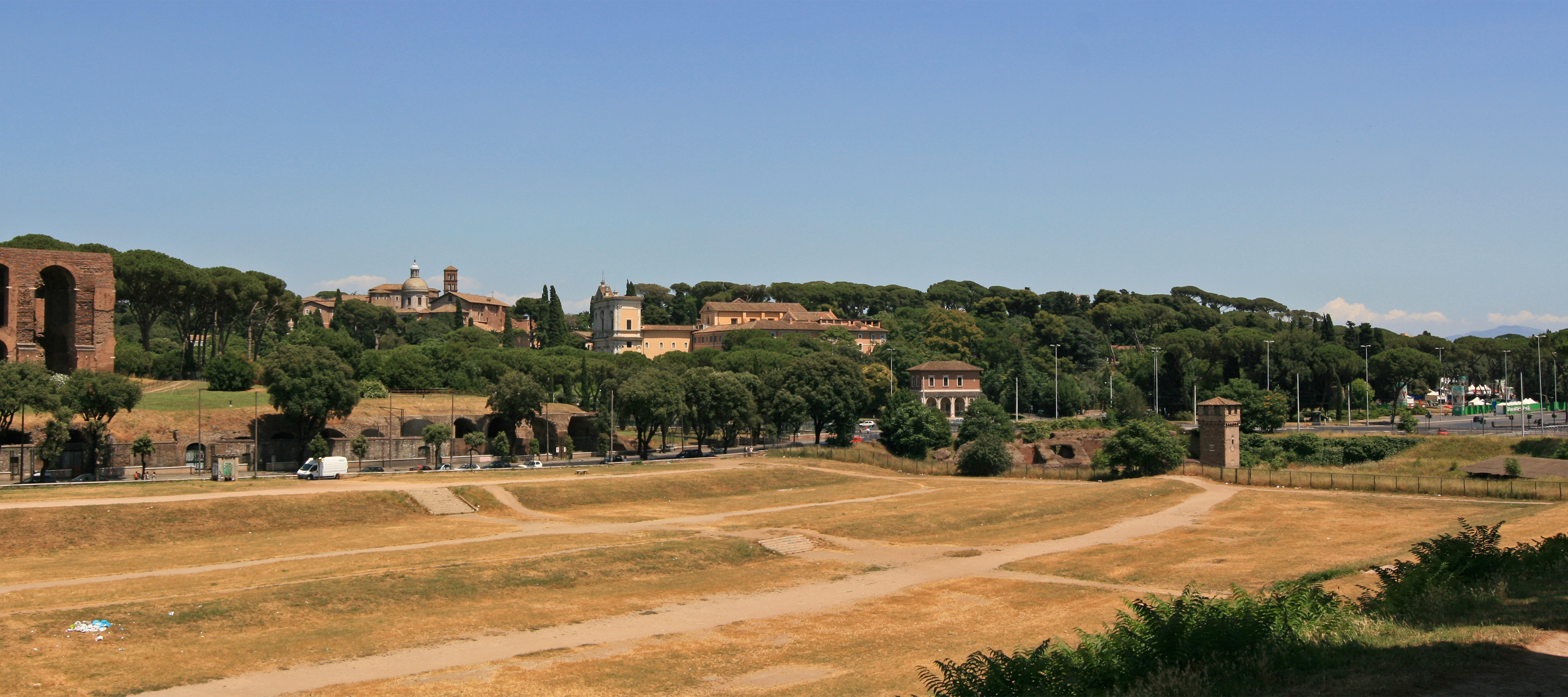
The Caelian Hill seen from the Aventine Hill.

The Caelian Hill is a moderately long promontory about 2 km (1.2 mi) long, 400 m (0.25 mi) to 500 m (0.31 mi) wide, and 50 m (160 ft) tall in the park near the Temple of Claudius. The hill overlooks a plateau from which the Esquiline, Viminal and Quirinal hills also arise.

Caeliolus (also Caeliculus or Caelius Minor) corresponds to a section of the hill, maybe the westernmost one, towards the valley that houses the Colosseum, or the one now occupied by the Basilica dei Santi Quattro Coronati.

== History ==
=== Archaic age ===
Schematic map of Rome showing the seven hills and Servian wall.

Under the reign of Tullus Hostilius, the entire population of Alba Longa was forcibly resettled on the Caelian Hill. According to a tradition recounted by Varro, the hill received its name from the Etruscan folk hero Caelius Vibenna, because he either settled there or was honored posthumously by his friend Servius Tullius. Other authors have linked the name to the Latin caelum, "heaven". Nevertheless, the former name of the hill probably was Querquetulanus mons due to the abundance of oaks (Latin: Quercus). Scholarship suggests that there existed the ethnic name Querquetulani as a designation of the previous inhabitants of Caelius, in pre-Etruscan times.

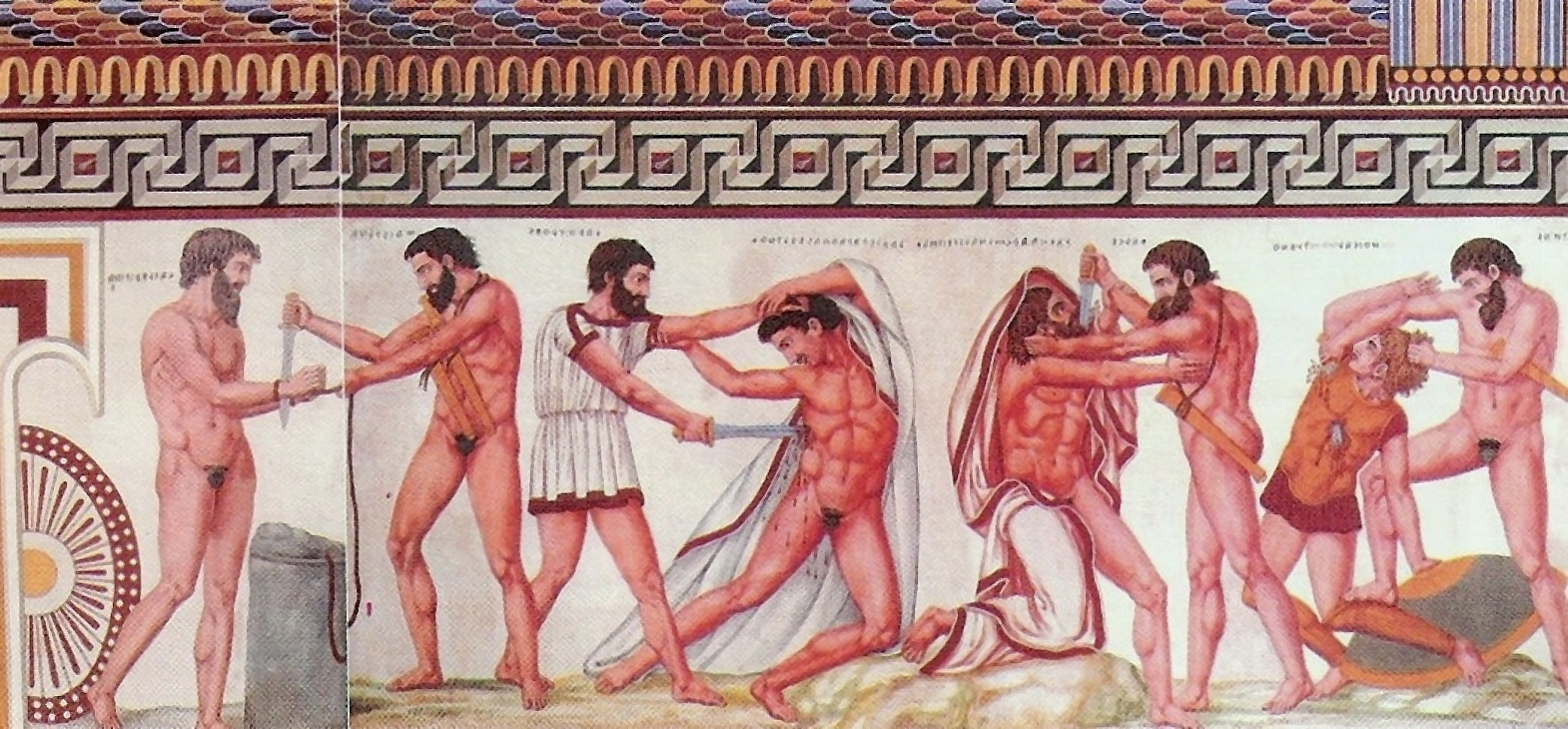
Detail of a facsimile of a fresco in the François Tomb at Vulci. Caelius Vibenna is the far left. 4th century BC

Mons Caelius would have been included in the city perimeter under the reign of Ancus Marcius. The list of Septimontium mentions it, and it was part of the 1st city quarter (Suburana) in the division made by Servius Tullius. In the later Augustan division, it became the Regio II Caelimontium.

A trace of the archaic period remains in the memory of cults of woods and sources, such as that of the nymph Egeria in the wood of Camenae, just outside Porta Capena. Numa Pompilius is said to have been particularly devoted to his sanctuary.

=== Republican age ===
In the Republican age (as well as in Imperial Rome) the Caelian Hill was a fashionable residential district and the site of residences of the wealthy. A section of Pliny the Elder's Natural History, "Who Was the First to Encrust the Walls of Houses at Rome with Marble", attests to this. Mamurra, a soldier who served under Julius Caesar in Gaul and profited tremendously from corruption, achieved this expensive feat on the Caelian Hill; Horace and Catullus mocked him accordingly.

Most of the hill was outside the boundaries of the pomerium, therefore temples to foreign divinities were allowed to be built, such as the Temple of Minerva Capta or the old Sacellum of Diana, outside the Servian Wall.

Some sepulchres, such as the burial chamber in Via Celimontana, just before Piazza di San Giovanni in Laterano, date back to this period.

=== Imperial age ===
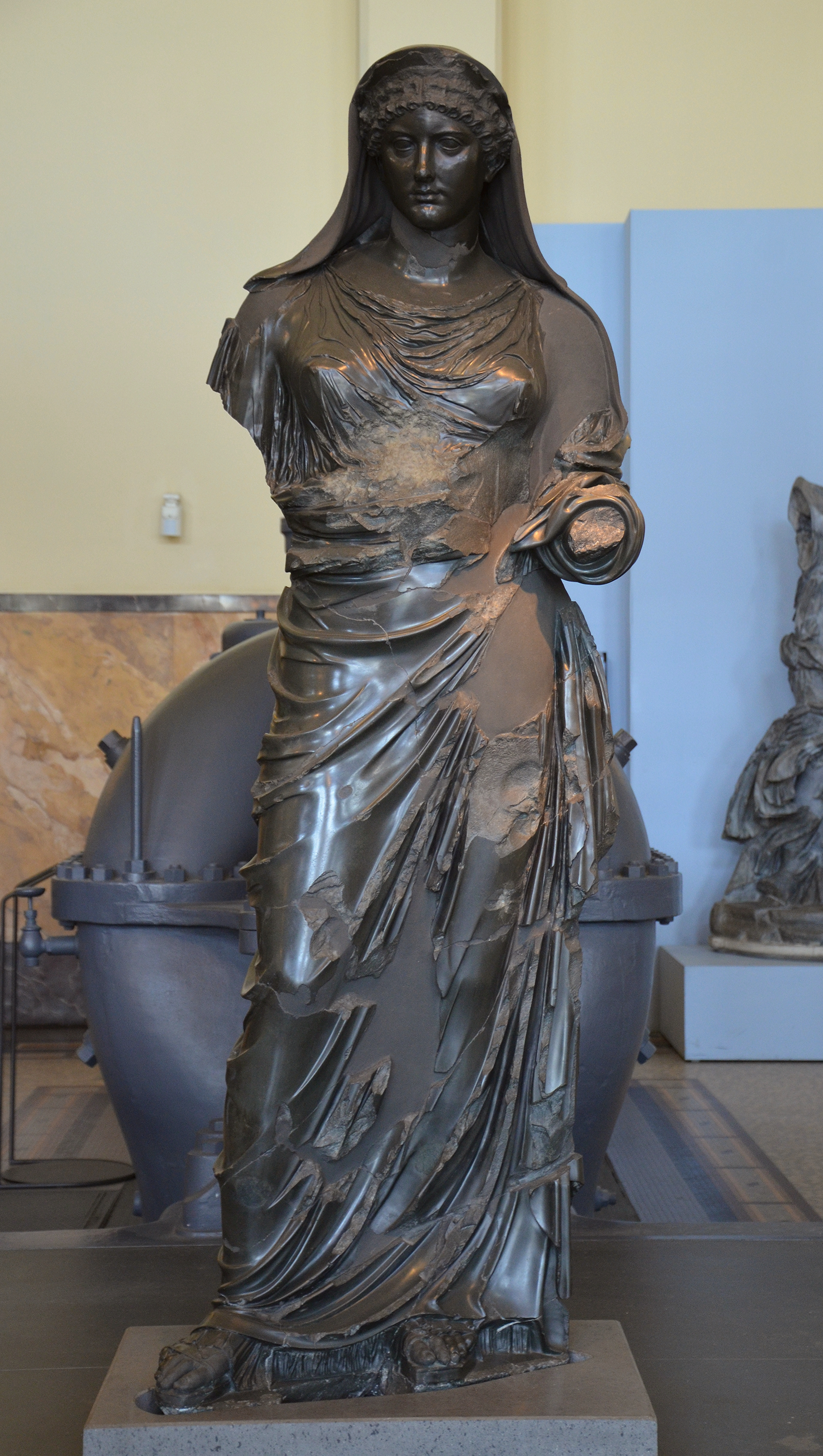
This basanite statue of Agrippina the Younger as a priestess of the divine Claudius, 54–59 AD, was discovered on the Caelian Hill in 1885.

Under Augustus the Caelian Hill was one of the 14 divisions of the town, called Caelimontium. The area between the Lateran and Porta Maggiore was included in the v Regio (Esquiliae), though physically it is part of the hill.

On the higher point of the side facing the Colosseum, the Temple of Claudius was erected on a huge supporting platform. It was dedicated to the Emperor Claudius and begun by his widow Agrippina after his death and deification in 54 AD; it was not ultimately finished until the reign of Vespasian. Nero added a grand nymphaeum (tiered water fountain) to the eastern retaining wall of this platform, with semi-circular and rectangular niches. The water to supply this fountain was supplied by a special branch of the Aqua Claudia, called the Arcus Neroniani, which extended 2 kilometres west from the Claudia at Porta Maggiore and terminated on the southern side of the Caelian Hill in a structure called the Aqueductium. The Aqueductium distributed the water via conduits to reservoirs behind the nymphaeum and to the site of the temple.

The remains found in the area of the hill allow one to reconstruct a conspicuous housing phase in the second half of the 2nd century AD, while former buildings of the 1st century BC were probably destroyed by a fire in AD 27.

Jerome alleges that Marcus Aurelius was born on the Caelian Hill in AD 121.

In the 4th century rich domus, surrounded by vast parks, stood on the hill, such as the ones belonging to the Symmachi (near which rose the Basilica hilariana) and Tetrici families, as well as the domus Faustae, perhaps belonging to the wife of Constantine I. The property of the Annii, of Domitia Lucilla Minor (the mother of Marcus Aurelius) and of the Quintilii became part of the Domus Vectiliana of Commodus.

In the interurban area of the hill several barracks were built for the troops stationed in the capital: in the site of the Basilica of Saint Stephen in the Round there were the Castra Peregrina (built under Trajan and restored several times in the following centuries), close to a large house of the Valerii (domus Valerii). Opposite, stood the headquarters of the V Cohort of the Vigiles (stazio cohortis V vigilum).

On land owned by the Laterani family, Septimius Severus built between 193 and 197 the castra nova equitum singularium, a new barrack for the knights corps of the imperial guard, opposite the former barrack built under Trajan (castra priora equitum singularium). When Constantine I dissolved the corps, the new basilica dedicated to the Messiah, which later became the Archbasilica of Saint John Lateran, partially occupied the area of the Severian camp.

The decisive battle in the 271 revolt of mint workers, led by Felicissimus, took place on the Caelian Hill. It is possible that this uprising was somehow connected with the senatorial and equestrian classes, as Aurelian executed several senators.

The buildings of the Caelian hill were badly damaged during the sack of Alaric in 410; starting from this period, the hill was subject to increasing abandonment and ruralization.

=== Middle Ages ===
In the 6th century it was part of the II Roman ecclesiastical region due to its proximity to the Lateran basilica, so much so that the toponym of "Laterano" was often used for the entire hill. The erection of the Patriarchium, which probably dates back to the 6th century, gave rise to the creation of various tituli (the oldest places of Christian worship, often within private houses) and xenodochia (centers for the assistance and reception of pilgrims and sick).

New churches continued to be built, initially to supersede the former tituli, later independently, such as the Basilica of Saints John and Paul, the Basilica of the Four Crowned Martyrs, the Basilica of St. Mary in Domnica, the Basilica of St. Stephen in the Round, the church of San Giovanni a Porta Latina, the church of San Gregorio al Celio, the church of San Tommaso in Formis, the church of San Sisto Vecchio.

Monasteries, often surrounded by estates and gardens, were also founded on the hill, as well as some towers of noble families, mainly in the 10th and 11th centuries. A new destruction was suffered with the sack of 1084.

From the 12th century, it was part of the Regio Montium, which even extended to the Quirinal Hill.

=== Later history ===
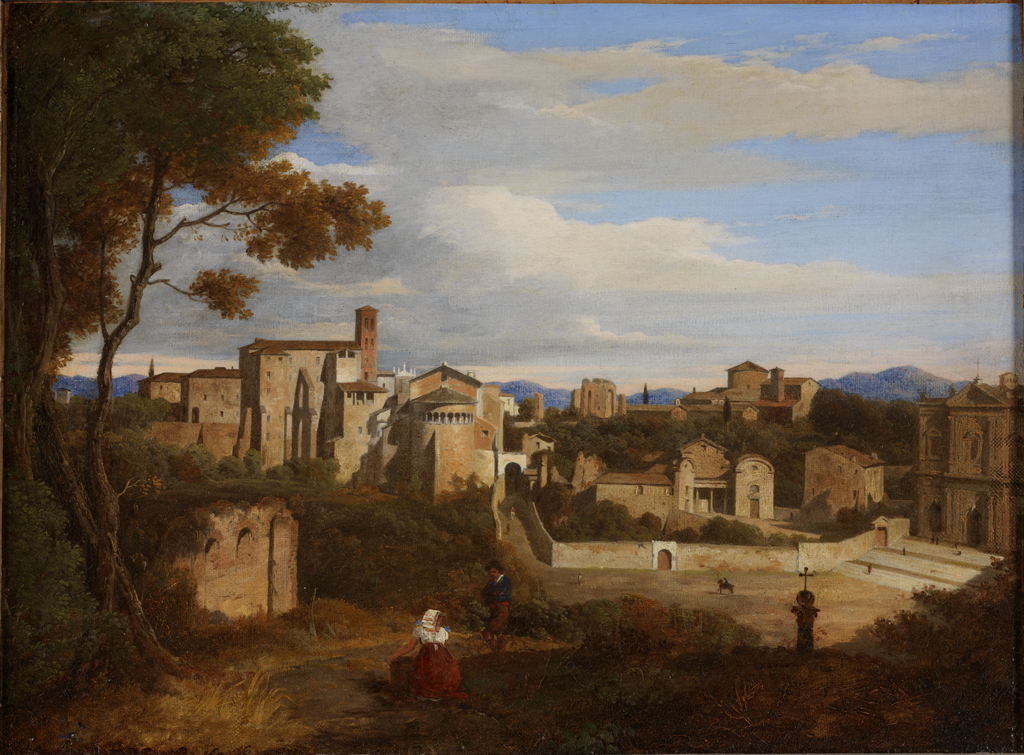
The Celian Hill from the Palatine by Charles Lock Eastlake, 1823

Today the Caelian Hill is included in the Rione of the same name and, continuing its vocation for assistance, hosts the Policlinico Militare del Celio, built on a project by Salvatore Bianchi and Filippo Laccetti.

George Santayana lived in a room at the Convent of English Blue Sisters on the Caelian Hill from 1912 until his death.

== Monuments ==
- Temple of Claudius
- Basilica dei Santi Quattro Coronati
- Clivus Scauri
- Library of Pope Agapetus I
- Basilica dei Santi Giovanni e Paolo
- Sant'Andrea al Celio
- Church of San Gregorio al Celio
- Basilica di Santa Maria in Domnica
- Arch of Dolabella
- Villa Celimontana
- Obelisk of villa Celimontana
- Church of San Tommaso in Formis
- Porta Metronia
- Porta Latina
- Church of San Giovanni a Porta Latina
- Oratory of San Giovanni in Oleo
- Tomb of the Scipios
- Basilica of San Sisto Vecchio
- Basilica di Santo Stefano Rotondo al Monte Celio

== See also ==
- Aventine Hill (Aventino)
- Capitoline Hill (Capitolino)
- Cispian Hill (Cispio)
- Janiculum Hill (Gianicolo)
- Monte Mario
- Oppian Hill (Oppio)
- Palatine Hill (Palatino)
- Pincian Hill (Pincio)
- Vatican Hill (Vaticano)
- Velian Hill (Velia)

== Bibliography ==
- Filippo Coarelli, Guida archeologica di Roma, Arnoldo Mondadori Editore, Verona 1984.
- Caelius I Santa Maria in Domnica San Tommaso in Formis e il clivus Scauri, edited by A. Englen, Erma di Bretschneider, Rome 2003
- Livy, Book One
